= John Sexton (MP for Canterbury) =

Member of the Parliament of England

Rt Hon John Sexton I

Member of Parliament for
- In office 1393–1394
- Preceded by: Edmund Horne
- Succeeded by: John Proude
- In office 1397
- Preceded by: Thomas Ickham
- Succeeded by: Robert Farthing
- In office 1404
- Preceded by: Robert Cooper
- Succeeded by: John Haute
- In office 1407–1410
- Preceded by: Edmund Horne
- Succeeded by: Thomas Lane

Personal details
- Spouse(s): Wife, Agnes
- Children: 1 daughter

John Sexton I, of Canterbury, Kent, was a Member of Parliament for the constituency of Canterbury, Kent for four separate terms between 1393 and 1410, as well as serving as a Jurat and holding a commission of array.
