= Thomas Chicche =

English politician

Thomas Chicche (fl. 1404), of Dane John, Canterbury, Kent, was an English politician.

== Family ==
The Chicche family had been a well-known 'gentlemanly' family in Canterbury since the 12th century. It is unknown if he married or had children.

== Career ==
He was a Member (MP) of the Parliament of England for Canterbury in January 1404. It is unknown when he died, but he ceased being involved in the running of the city in 1408.

Parliament of England
Preceded by John Sheldwich; Robert Cooper	Member of Parliament for Canterbury; 1404; With: John Sexton	Succeeded by John Umfray; John Haute
