= Matthew Hadde =

English politician

Matthew Hadde (c. 1544/5 – 8 August 1617), of St. Alphege, Canterbury, Kent and Lincoln's Inn, London, was an English politician.

He was a Member (MP) of the Parliament of England for Canterbury in 1604.

Parliament of England
Preceded by John Boys; John Rogers	Member of Parliament for Canterbury; 1604; With: John Boys	Succeeded by George Newman; William Lovelace
