= John Finch, 1st Baron Finch =

English judge and politician (1584–1660)

The Right Honourable The Lord Finch Kt KC
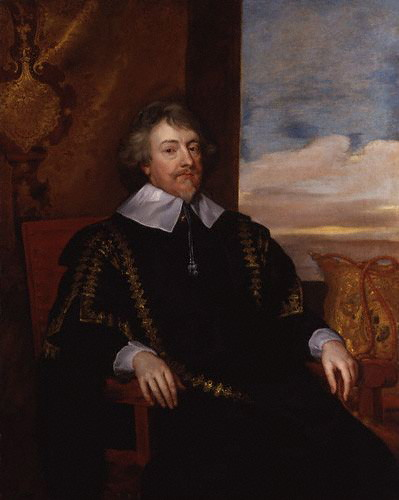
- Portrait by Anthony van Dyck

Lord Keeper of the Great Seal
- In office 1640–1641
- Preceded by: The Lord Coventry
- Succeeded by: Sir Edward Littleton

Chief Justice of the Common Pleas
- In office 1634–1640
- Preceded by: Sir Robert Heath
- Succeeded by: Sir Edward Littleton

Speaker of the House of Commons
- In office 1628–1629
- Preceded by: Sir Heneage Finch
- Succeeded by: Sir John Glanville

Personal details
- Born: 17 September 1584
- Died: 27 November 1660 (aged 76)
- Education: Emmanuel College, Cambridge

John Finch, 1st Baron Finch (17 September 1584 – 20 November 1660) was an English judge, and politician who sat in the House of Commons at various times between 1621 and 1629. He was Speaker of the House of Commons.

== Early life ==
Finch was the son of Sir Henry Finch of Eastwell, Kent. He was admitted to Emmanuel College, Cambridge in 1596 and admitted at Gray's Inn on 5 February 1601. He was called to the bar in November 1611.

== Political career ==
Finch became recorder of Canterbury in 1619. In 1621, he was elected Member of Parliament for Canterbury. In his capacity as recorder, he welcomed King Charles I when he arrived at Canterbury for his marriage in Canterbury Cathedral on 13 June 1625, and Finch was knighted by the King two days later on 15 June. He became King's Counsel in 1626. He was re-elected MP for Canterbury in 1626 and 1628. In 1628 Finch was elected Speaker, a post which he retained until 1629 when Parliament was dissolved. He was held down in his chair by Holles and others on the occasion of Sir John Eliot's resolution on tonnage and poundage.

== Judicial career ==
In 1634, Finch was appointed chief justice of the Court of Common Pleas, and distinguished himself by the active zeal with which he upheld the king's prerogative. Notable also was the brutality which characterized his conduct as chief justice, particularly in the cases of William Prynne and John Langton.

Finch presided over the trial of John Hampden, who resisted the payment of ship money, and was chiefly responsible for the decision of the judges that ship-money was constitutional. As a reward for his services he was, in 1640, appointed Lord Keeper of the Great Seal of England, and was also created Baron Finch, of Fordwich. He had, however, become so unpopular that one of the first acts of the Long Parliament, which met in the same year, was his impeachment. His estates were sequestrated and he took refuge in Holland. The Great Seal was passed to Edward Littleton.

When he was allowed to return to England is uncertain, but in 1660 he was one of the commissioners for the trial of the regicides, though he does not appear to have taken much part in the proceedings.

Finch who had been accused of high treason twenty years before, by a full Parliament, and who by flying from their justice had saved his life, was appointed to judge some of those who should have been his judges; ...

He died on 20 November 1660 and was buried in St. Martin's Church, Canterbury, his peerage becoming extinct.

== See also ==
- Earl of Winchilsea
- Heneage Finch, 1st Baron Finch

== Notes ==
Parliament of England
Preceded by George Newman; Sir William Lovelace	Member of Parliament for Canterbury; 1621–1622; With: Sir Robert Newington	Succeeded by Thomas Scott; Thomas Denn
Preceded by John Fisher; Sir Thomas Wilsford	Member of Parliament for Canterbury; 1628–1629; With: James Palmer 1626; Thomas Scott 1628–1629	Parliament suspended until 1640
Political offices
Preceded by Sir Heneage Finch	Speaker of the House of Commons; 1628-1629	Succeeded by Sir John Glanville
Legal offices
Preceded by Sir Robert Heath	Chief Justice of the Common Pleas; 1634–1640	Succeeded by Sir Edward Littleton
Political offices
Preceded by Lord Coventry	Lord Keeper; 1640–1641	Succeeded by Sir Edward Littleton
Peerage of England
New creation	Baron Finch; 1640–1660	Extinct
