= William Lovelace =

William Lovelace may refer to:

- William Randolph Lovelace II (1907–1965), American physician
- William Lovelace (MP, died 1577), English politician and lawyer, member of parliament (MP) for Canterbury
- William Lovelace (1561–1629), member of parliament for Canterbury
- William Lovelace, of the American Harp Society
