= Ickham (disambiguation) =

Ickham is a village.

Ickham may also refer to:

- Ickham and Well, a civil parish in Kent, South East England
- Thomas Ickham (died 1415), MP for Canterbury
- William Ickham (died 1424), MP for Canterbury
