= John Sheldwich =

John Sheldwich may refer to:

- John Sheldwich (died after 1411), MP for Canterbury in 1399 and 1402
- John Sheldwich (died c. 1455), MP for Canterbury 1413–1421
