= Robert Lincoln (disambiguation) =

Robert Todd Lincoln (1843–1926) was an American lawyer and politician, and the eldest son of U.S. president Abraham Lincoln and first lady Mary Todd Lincoln

Robert or Bobby Lincoln may also refer to:

- Bobby Lincoln (born 1953), South African golfer
- Bobby Lincoln, a character in The Reluctant Fundamentalist
- Robert Lincoln (MP), MP and father of Henry Lincoln

== See also ==
- Robert Todd Lincoln Beckwith (1904–1985), grandson of Robert Lincoln and great-grandson of Abraham Lincoln
