= Thomas Holt =

Thomas Holt may refer to:

- Thomas Holt (architect) (1578?–1624), English architect
- Thomas Holt (MP for Canterbury), England, in 1386
- Thomas Holt (Serjeant-at-Law) (1616–1686), English lawyer and politician; Member of Parliament for Abingdon
- Thomas Holt (Australian politician) (1811–1888), wool merchant, financier and politician
- Thomas Michael Holt (1831–1896), Governor of North Carolina, 1891–1893
- Thomas Holt (American architect) (1835–1889)
- Tom Holt (swimmer) (1923–2004), British swimmer
- Thomas C. Holt (born 1942), American writer and historian
- Tom Holt (born 1961), author of humorous fantasies and historical fiction

== See also ==
- Thomas Holte (1571–1654), English landowner
- Thomas Holte (MP) (died 1546), Member of the Parliament of England for Warwick in 1529
- Tom Holte, a fictional character from Sandino (film)
- Holte (surname)
- Holt (surname)
- Holt (disambiguation)
