= Lydia Fenet =

American auctioneer and author

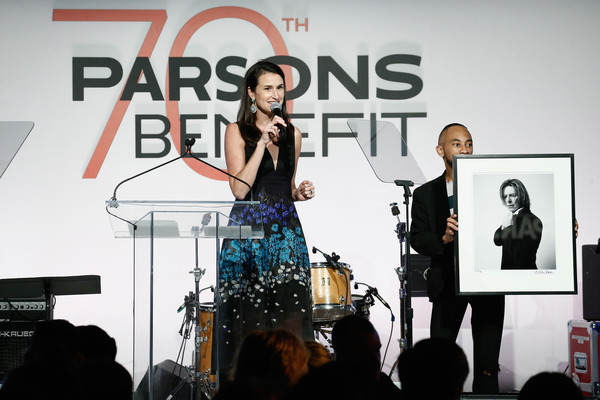
Lydia Fenet

Lydia Fenet is an American auctioneer, author, podcast host and globally recognized speaker. As CEO & Founder of The Lydia Fenet Agency, she has raised over a billion dollars for non-profits globally as the world's leading charity auctioneer. In addition, she serves as the Principal Auctioneer for Broad Arrow Group Auctions.

== Early life and education ==
Fenet grew up in Lake Charles, Louisiana. She attended boarding school at The Taft School in Watertown, CT and then went to Sewanee double majoring in art history and history. During that time she participated in the European Studies program at Oxford University.

== Career ==
In college, Fenet interned for Senator John Breaux in Washington, DC and Sir Julian Brazier in the House of Commons. Between her junior and senior year in college she interned for Christie’s auction house. She returned to the firm immediately after college working in the Special Events department for five years before taking over as Head of Special Events for North and South America. In 2011 she launched the Strategic Partnerships division for Christie’s a division which she has scaled to a global division. In addition to her role as Global Managing Director of Strategic Partnerships, Fenet is also the lead benefit auctioneer for the firm raising over half a billion dollars for non-profits around the world.

Fenet is also a book author of the best selling book, The Most Powerful Woman in the Room is You published by Simon & Schuster in April 2019. She is a keynote speaker represented by CAA. Her second book, Claim Your Confidence, was published in March 2022. She currently hosts the critically acclaimed podcast Claim Your Confidence in association with Rockefeller Center. Her first book was optioned by Netflix in 2022.
