= Proude =

Proude is a surname. Notable people with the surname include:

- John Proude (died c. 1409), English politician
- Johnny Proude, fictional character
- Jasper Proude (1905–1958), English poet and writer
