= 1918 Canterbury by-election =

UK Parliamentary by-election

The 1918 Canterbury by-election was held on 9 August 1918. The by-election was held due to the death of the incumbent Conservative MP, Francis Bennett-Goldney. It was won by the Conservative candidate George Knox Anderson who was unopposed due to a War-time electoral pact.
