= Umfray =

Umfray is a surname. Notable people with the surname include:

- Andrew Umfray, 14th-century bishop
- John Umfray (died 1409 or after), English politician and draper
