= Matthew Head (disambiguation) =

Matthew Head is an umpire.

Matthew Head may also refer to:

- A crime novel writer (pseudonym of art critic and historian John Canaday)
- Mathew Head, rugby league footballer
- Matthew Head (MP), for Canterbury
