= Robert Alcock =

Robert Alcock may refer to:

- Robert Alcock (MP) (died 1583), MP for Canterbury
- Robert James Michael Alcock (born 1936), RAF commander
