= Henry Lincoln (disambiguation) =

Henry Lincoln (1930-2022) is a British author, television presenter, scriptwriter, and actor.

Henry Lincoln may also refer to:

- Henry Lincoln (MP) (died 1397), MP for Canterbury

== See also ==
- Henry Lincoln Johnson (1870–1925), African-American attorney and politician
- Henry Leland, he founded Lincoln Motor Company
