= Nicholas Fish (disambiguation) =

Nicholas Fish was an American Revolutionary War soldier.

Nicholas Fish may also refer to:

- Nicholas Fish II (1846–1902), grandson of the soldier
- Nicholas Fish (MP) (died 1558), English politician
- Cola Pesce, an Italian folktale
