= Gervays =

Gervays is a surname. Notable people with the surname include:

- Richard Gervays, MP
- John Gervays

== See also ==
- Gervais (disambiguation)
- Gervay
