= Richard Gervais =

Richard Gervais may refer to:

- Ricky Gervais, English actor, comedian and presenter
- Richard Gervays, English MP
