= William Emery (MP) =

Member of the Parliament of England

William Emery (died 1431/1432), of Canterbury, Kent, was an English politician and lawyer.

== Family ==
Emery was married twice. Before September 1409, he married a woman named Christine. He later married Agnes.

== Career ==
Emery was a Member of Parliament for Canterbury, Kent, in May 1413.
