= Richard Water =

Member of the Parliament of England

Richard Water (died 1416 or after) of Canterbury, Kent, was an English politician and lawyer.

== Family ==
Water married, before September 1395, a woman named Margery.

== Career ==
Water was a Member of Parliament for Canterbury, Kent in 1406, 1407 and April 1414.
