= William Benet (MP) =

English politician (1381–1463)

William Benet (1381–1463), of Canterbury, Kent, was an English politician and tavern owner.

He was a Member (MP) of the Parliament of England for Canterbury in October 1416, 1420, 1425, 1435 and 1450. He was Mayor of Canterbury in 1449–50.
