= Rosie Duffield =

British politician (born 1971)

Rosie Duffield MP
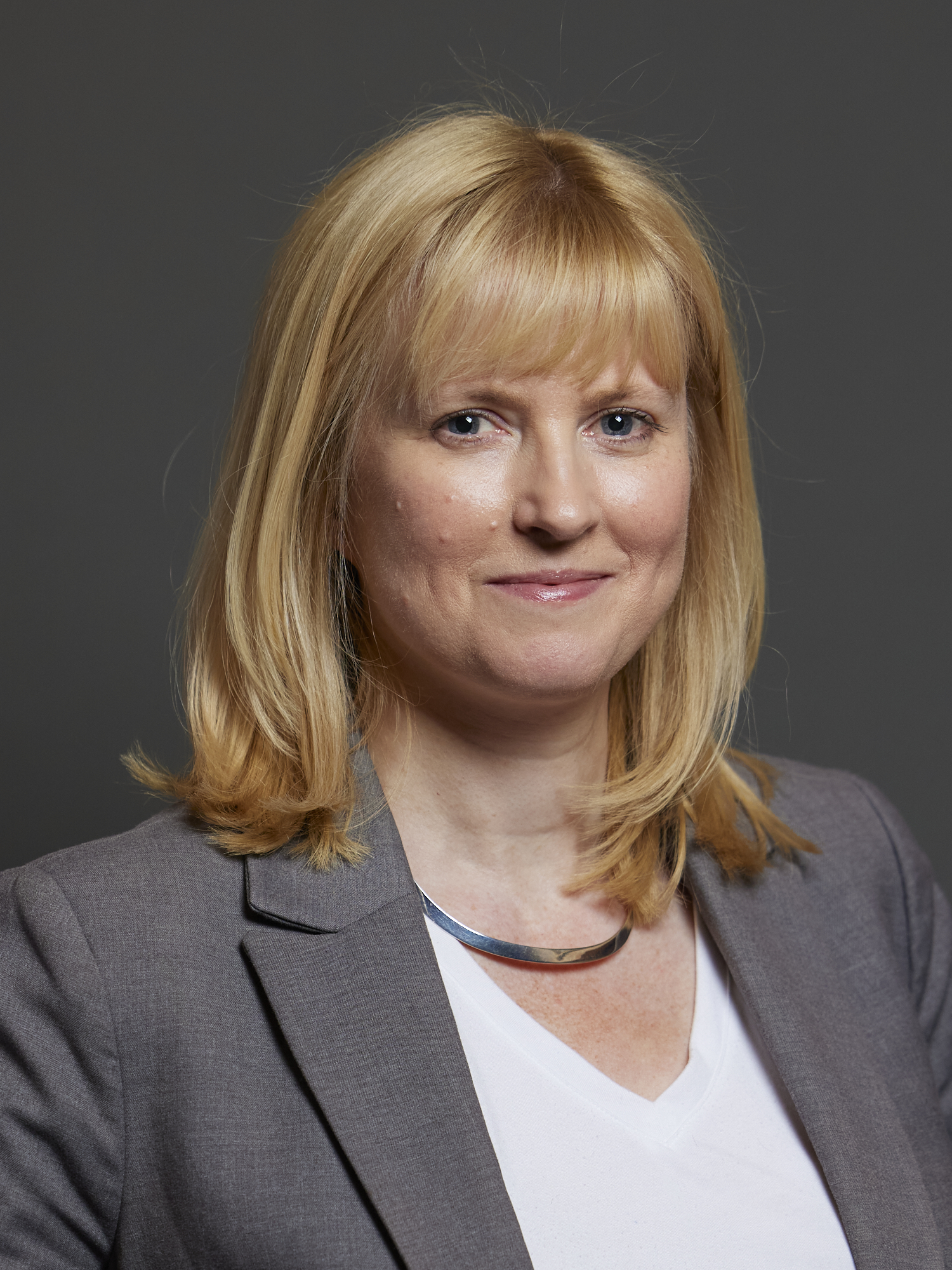
- Official portrait, 2024

Opposition Whip in the House of Commons
- In office 14 April 2020 – 31 May 2020
- Leader: Keir Starmer
- Chief Whip: Nick Brown
- Preceded by: Alex Norris
- Succeeded by: Gill Furniss

Member of Parliament for Canterbury
- Incumbent
- Assumed office 8 June 2017
- Preceded by: Julian Brazier
- Majority: 8,653 (18.4%)

Personal details
- Born: Rosemary Clare Duffield; 1 July 1971 (age 55) Norwich, Norfolk, England
- Party: Independent
- Other political affiliations: Labour (until 2024)
- Children: 2
- Website: www.rosieduffieldmp.co.uk

Rosemary Clare Duffield (born 1 July 1971) is a British politician who has been Member of Parliament (MP) for Canterbury since being elected in 2017. After resigning as a member of the Labour Party in September 2024, she is an independent.

== Early life ==
Rosemary Clare Duffield was born on 1 July 1971 in Norwich, and later moved to south-east London, where her father worked as an anti-terrorism police officer. She left school at the age of 16 with no qualifications and completed an administration apprenticeship at Guy's Hospital in Central London. She then attended a further education college. She moved to Canterbury in 1998 and worked as a primary school teaching assistant in various schools, before becoming briefly a political satire writer.

In 2015 she stood for Labour in the St Stephen's ward of Canterbury City Council where both seats were won by the Conservative Party.

== Parliamentary career ==
=== 1st term (2017–2019) ===
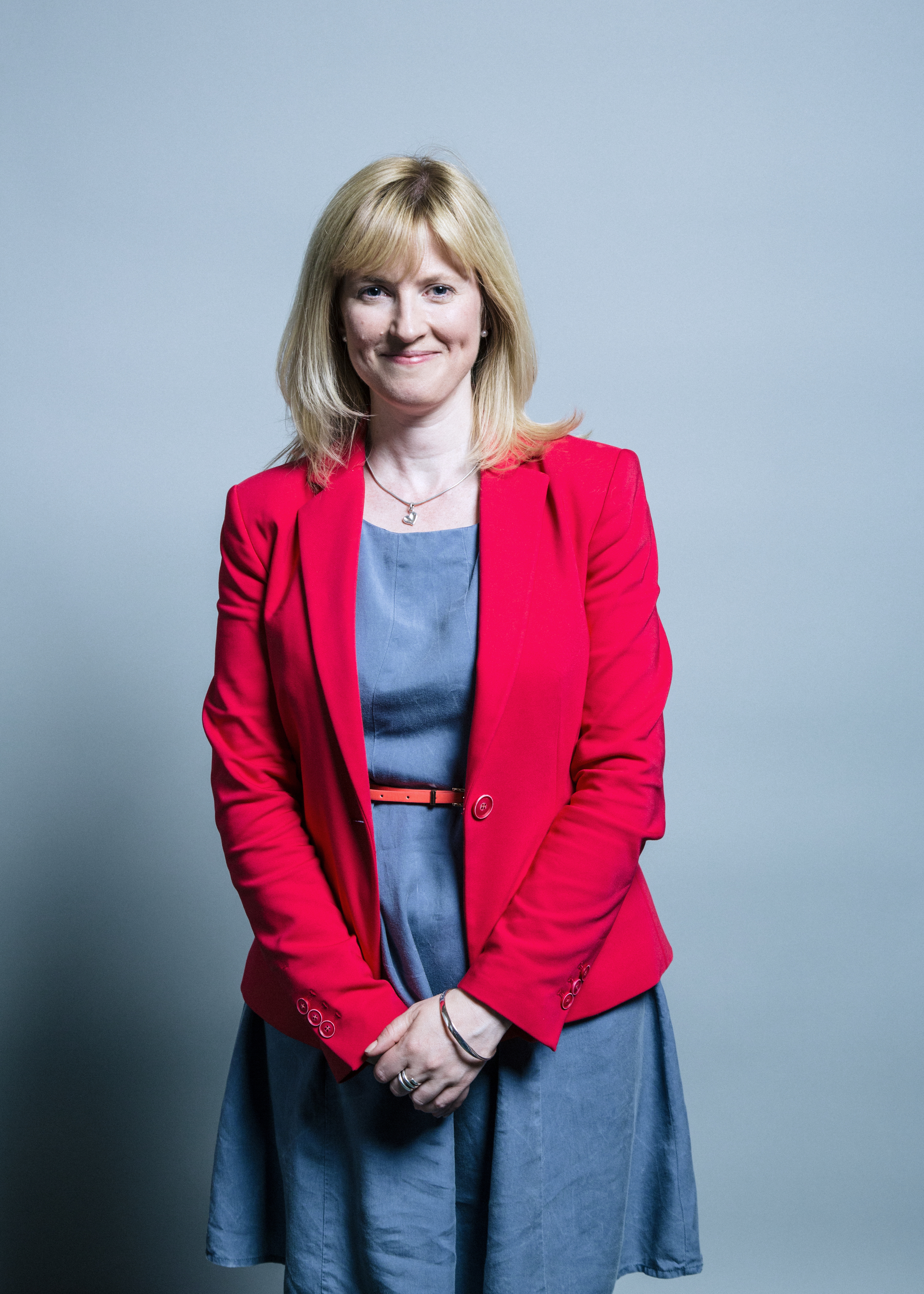
Official parliamentary portrait, 2017

At the 2017 general election Duffield was elected to the House of Commons as the MP for Canterbury with 45 per cent of the vote and a majority of 187. A major regional news site described her election victory as "the single biggest political shock the Canterbury and Whitstable constituency has ever seen."

Duffield was appointed Parliamentary Private Secretary (PPS) to Dawn Butler, then the Shadow Secretary of State for Women and Equalities. On 13 June 2018 she was one of six MPs to resign from the Opposition front bench to vote in favour of the UK joining the European Economic Area and thereby remaining in the single market, as the party had instructed its MPs to abstain.

In July 2017 she appeared on RT, a television network funded by the Russian government. Duffield later apologised to the LGBTQ community for doing so.

Duffield is opposed to new grammar schools, and Eleven-plus exams. She was criticised after it was reported that both her children had gone to grammar schools.

Duffield voted for the UK remaining within the European Union (EU) in the 2016 UK EU membership referendum. In the indicative votes on 27 March 2019, she voted for a customs union with the EU and a referendum on a Brexit withdrawal agreement, but abstained on the "Common Market 2.0" proposal.

In September 2018 Duffield attended a march protesting against Labour's stance on antisemitism and said that MPs could strike if the party did not endorse the International Holocaust Remembrance Alliance (IHRA)'s definition of antisemitism. She was criticised by some local party members for her attendance. In July 2019 the chair of her constituency Labour Party said her language was "incredibly reckless" after she agreed with a remark by the Chair of the Jewish Labour Movement that Labour "probably is" institutionally antisemitic.

In October 2019 Duffield succeeded Jess Phillips as Chair of the Women's Parliamentary Labour Party.

=== 2nd term (2019–2024) ===
Duffield was re-elected as MP for Canterbury at the 2019 general election with an increased vote share of 48 per cent and an increased majority of 1,836.

She has been a member of the Environment, Food and Rural Affairs Select Committee since March 2020 and was previously a member of the Work and Pensions Select Committee between June 2018 and November 2019 and the Women and Equalities Committee between September 2017 and June 2018 and March and May 2020.

On 14 April 2020 Duffield was appointed a Labour whip by the party’s leader, Keir Starmer. She resigned from the position a month later after breaking COVID-19 lockdown rules when she met her married partner whilst they were living in separate households. Duffield apologised and said she accepted her actions constituted a breach of the law at the time.

In July 2020, Duffield voiced in Parliament concerns about nitrous oxide being sold to and used recreationally by young people, calling for tighter restrictions on its sale. Duffield said that use of the drug had become "much more prevalent" during the 2020 COVID-19 lockdown and cited health concerns over its use.

In June 2024 Duffield announced that she would not be attending local hustings for the general election because of concerns about her security, referring to "constant trolling, spite and misinterpretation".

=== 3rd term (2024–present) ===
At the 2024 general election, Duffield was again re-elected, with a decreased vote share of 41.4 per cent and an increased majority of 8,653. Duffield told KentOnline that she planned to spend the Parliament "causing trouble from the backbenchers" if she was not promoted.

On 28 September 2024, Duffield announced that she had resigned the Labour whip and would sit as an independent. In her resignation letter, she criticised Starmer's "cruel and unnecessary policies", "sleaze, nepotism and apparent avarice", and "hypocrisy" over his acceptance of gifts. She also described it as "frankly embarrassing" that he had appointed newly elected MPs as junior ministers.

The Sunday Times described her resignation of the whip, less than three months after the election, as making her "the fastest MP to jump ship after a general election in modern political history".

== Position on transgender rights ==
=== Staff issues ===
On 14 August 2020 a lesbian woman, reported to be her only LGBT staff member, quit Duffield's team, saying that her stance was transphobic and had brought an influx of transphobic and homophobic mail to Duffield's office in support of the remarks. Duffield reasserted her commitment to reforming the Gender Recognition Act 2004 and to being a supporter of transgender rights following the staff member's resignation. In October 2020 a second member of Duffield's staff resigned citing her "overtly transphobic views." Duffield was criticised by the GMB trade union for attempting to dox her former staff member by "attempting to reveal her identity on social media".

=== Views ===
During an interview with the BBC's Andrew Marr in 2021, Starmer said that Duffield's comment that only women have a cervix was "something that shouldn't be said" and was "not right". Duffield locked her Twitter account after a fake tweet attributed to her was circulated. The Labour MPs Jess Phillips, Rachel Reeves and Wes Streeting supported Duffield, as did the Archbishop of Canterbury, Justin Welby, who tweeted that "she does not seek to demean others". In May 2024 Starmer said of Duffield's comment: "Biologically, she of course is right".

In September 2021, in an interview on BBC Radio 4, Duffield said that: "There are men, activists, out there who are married to women who call themselves the Q word [queer], and they appropriate gay culture in a way that is deeply offensive to quite a lot in the gay movement, the gay rights movement". Her comments were cited in an article on biphobia in PinkNews which said: "Comments like these invalidate the identity of bi/pan/queer men in different-gender relationships." Talking to the screenwriter and activist Graham Linehan in the same month, Duffield described non-binary gender as "choosing not to be male or female". She said that women should be asked "Why are you rejecting mostly being female, being a woman"?

In October 2021 Duffield attended the first annual conference of the LGB Alliance where she spoke on a panel about free speech alongside her fellow MP Joanna Cherry. In October 2022 The Daily Telegraph reported that, with her fellow "gender critical" parliamentarians Cherry and Anne Jenkin, she was setting up a cross-party "biology policy unit", "to help ensure policies across the public sector that are based on gender identity theory are documented and scrutinised".

On 20 January 2023 Duffield wrote a column in which she stated that being a member of the Labour Party is like being in an "abusive relationship" and that she feels the party has a "woman problem" after she was criticised for voicing her opposition to the First Minister of Scotland Nicola Sturgeon's Gender Recognition Reform (Scotland) Bill.

=== Complaints ===
On 27 July 2021 it was reported that the Labour Party would undertake an investigation into Duffield following complaints by LGBT+ Labour, after she liked a tweet by Kurtis Tripp, a gay American rapper, describing trans people as "mostly heterosexuals cosplaying as the opposite sex".

In 2020 several Labour groups called for the Labour Parliamentary party whip to be withdrawn from Duffield, arguing that her views are transphobic. In October 2022, Labour Students, Young Labour and LGBT+ Labour urged the party to withdraw the whip from Duffield. Labour Students said that "Duffield's behaviour has gone beyond the pale and we echo LGBT+ Labour's calls that she should lose the whip" and that she has "consistently gone out of her way to damage the trans community, including appearing at the conference of an anti-trans lobbying group." In the same month Kent Labour Students issued a statement calling for her to lose the Labour whip and to be replaced as the Labour candidate at the next election.

In November 2023 it was reported by KentOnline that Duffield was being investigated by the Labour Party for alleged antisemitism for liking a tweet by Graham Linehan which itself was a response to a tweet by the comedian Eddie Izzard. The Times reported that Duffield had denied allegations of anti-semitism, stating that the tweet had been "sarcastically mocking" of Izzard's reference to trans people being targeted during the Holocaust. Duffield issued a statement in January 2024, confirming that the complaint had been dismissed by the Labour Party's National Executive Committee.

In 2024, 33 student Labour clubs issued a statement condemning "in the strongest terms" the party's national executive committee for dismissing an investigation of Duffield on allegations of antisemitism and transphobia, and said Labour "cannot be a progressive party when we are endorsing rhetoric that creates hate and misery for our trans siblings."

=== Harassment ===
In September 2021 Duffield said she would miss the Labour Party conference in Brighton on security advice. According to The Sunday Times, she received online threats from transgender campaigners. Duffield discussed the abuse directed against her with House of Commons Speaker Sir Lindsay Hoyle, Labour's Chief Whip Sir Alan Campbell and her local police. Duffield told The Sunday Times that she mainly took the decision to miss the Party Conference "not because I really thought I was going to be attacked, but because I did not want to be the centre of attention." Duffield later made an unannounced appearance to speak at a fringe event at the party's conference hosted by the Labour Women's Declaration group.

Duffield said in a series of tweets in January 2022 that she was "considering her future in the Labour party very carefully" because of the "obsessive harassment" received from party members and a lack of support from the party leadership against the "constant stream of fictional and factional bile that is written about me".

In June 2024 a man was sentenced to two suspended jail sentences of eight weeks and a 12-month community order for making death threats against Duffield and the author J. K. Rowling.

== Personal life ==
Duffield is in a relationship with a television producer named James Routh; she has two sons from a previous relationship. During a debate on the Domestic Abuse Bill on 2 October 2019, she said she suffered domestic abuse in late 2017 from her then fiancé (neither of the above), and received a standing ovation.

Parliament of the United Kingdom
Preceded by Julian Brazier	Member of Parliament for Canterbury; 2017–present	Incumbent
