= William Rose (MP for Canterbury) =

English politician (fl. 1411–1435)

William Rose (fl. 1411–1435), of Canterbury, Kent, was an English politician.

== Family ==
He married Alice St Cler and they had one son.

== Career ==
Rose was a Member of Parliament for Canterbury, Kent in 1411, 1423, 1429 and 1435.
