= David Crouch (politician) =

British politician (1919–1998)

Sir David Lance Crouch (23 June 1919 – 18 February 1998) was a British Conservative politician.

Crouch was educated at University College School, London and became a marketing consultant. He contested Leeds West in 1959, and served as Member of Parliament for Canterbury from 1966 until he retired in 1987. The awarding of his knighthood was announced shortly after he stood down as an MP.

== Personal life ==
Crouch married Margaret Noakes in 1947. They had a son, sculptor Patrick Crouch, and a daughter. He died in Faversham, Kent, on 18 February 1998, aged 78.

== Sources ==
- The Times Guide to the House of Commons, Times Newspapers Ltd, 1966
- Notice, thegazette.co.uk. Accessed 8 January 2023.
- Obituary, independent.co.uk. Accessed 8 January 2023.
- "ARTIST Patrick Crouch has completed a stone sculpture for outside Kent University’s Registry. The 8ft tall piece was unveiled by the university’s former vice-chancellor David Melville.", pressreader.com. Accessed 8 January 2023.

Parliament of the United Kingdom
Preceded by Leslie Thomas	Member of Parliament for Canterbury; 1966 – 1987	Succeeded by Julian Brazier
