= Francis Bennett-Goldney =

British politician

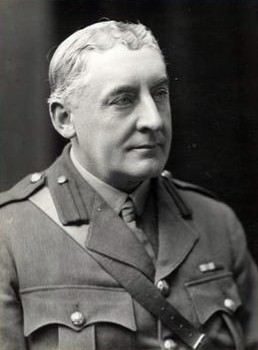
Francis Bennett-Goldney in military uniform during the First World War

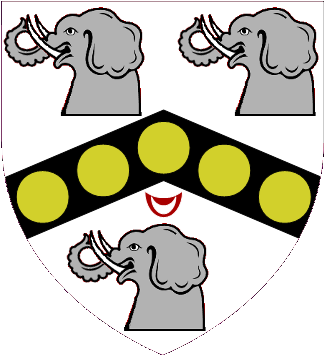
Shield of arms as displayed in the Commons chamber

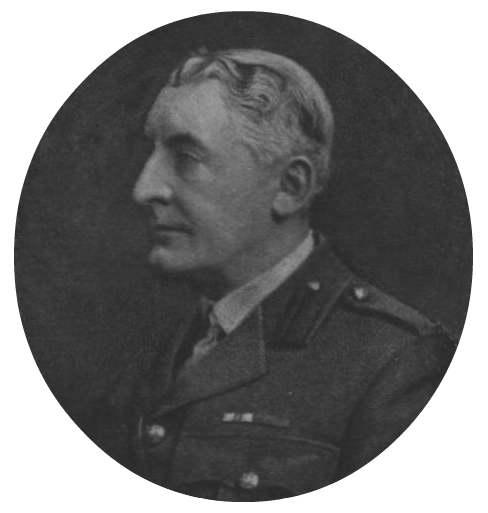
Bennett-Goldney's portrait published in The Illustrated London News on 24 August 1918

Major Francis Bennett-Goldney FSA MP (1865 – 26 July 1918) was an antiquary, Member of Parliament (MP) for Canterbury and former Mayor of Canterbury, who died during World War I.

== Life ==
He was born Francis Evans, the son of Sebastian Evans, in Moseley, near Birmingham. He later assumed his mother's family name of Bennett-Goldney.

Bennett-Goldney was appointed as Athlone Pursuivant of the Order of St Patrick in February 1907, and has been mentioned as a possible suspect in the theft of the insignia of the Order, known as the Irish Crown Jewels, in July 1907.

From at least 1899 to 1913, Bennett-Goldney was the honorary curator of Royal Museum and Art Gallery in Canterbury. He served as Mayor of Canterbury, 1906 – 11. He was elected as the Independent Unionist Member of Parliament for Canterbury at the general election of December 1910; he had stood at the January 1910 general election, narrowly failing to defeat the Conservative MP. In the years leading up to the war, he frequently spoke of the threat posed by Germany, and never wavered from his opinions despite criticism. He was also very active in the service of aiding refugees in the early days of the war. His family home, Abbot's Barton in Canterbury, was used as a VAD hospital.

He joined the British Embassy in Paris in October 1917 as honorary assistant military attaché. He was promoted as a temporary major on the General List on 13 May 1918. He died 26 July 1918 in an American hospital in Brest from injuries sustained in a car accident. He was buried at St Germain-en-Laye, near Paris.

Bennett-Goldney is commemorated on Panel 8 of the Parliamentary War Memorial in Westminster Hall, one of 22 MPs that died during World War I to be named on that memorial. At the time of his death, he was the 17th member of the House of Commons to have died serving in the war. Bennett-Goldney is one of 19 MPs who fell in the war who are commemorated by heraldic shields in the Commons Chamber. A further act of commemoration came with the unveiling in 1932 of a manuscript-style illuminated book of remembrance for the House of Commons, which includes a short biographical account of the life and death of Bennett-Goldney.

== Thievery ==
Following Bennett-Goldney's death, it was discovered he was a chronic thief, his home filled with stolen items, including a painting which was the property of the Duke of Bedford. His estate was subject to legal action to retrieve some of his thefts from the City of Canterbury Museum and Library.

Parliament of the United Kingdom
Preceded by John Henniker Heaton	Member of Parliament for Canterbury; December 1910 – 1918	Succeeded by George Knox Anderson
