= Charles Purton Cooper =

English lawyer and antiquary

Charles Purton Cooper QC, FRS (1793–1873) was an English lawyer and antiquary.

== Life ==
He was educated at Wadham College, Oxford, where he was a contemporary of Richard Bethell, and in 1814 he attained double first-class honours, and graduated B.A. on 7 December 1814, and on 5 July 1817 M.A. He was called to the bar at Lincoln's Inn in Michaelmas term 1816.

After practising as an equity draughtsman, he was appointed a Queen's Counsel in 1837, and became queen's serjeant for the Duchy of Lancaster. In 1836 he became a bencher of Lincoln's Inn; he was treasurer in 1855, and master of the library in 1856.

His enthusiasm for the cause of legal reform attracted the attention of Henry Brougham, by whom he was introduced to the Holland House circle and the heads of the Whig party. Lord Brougham appointed him secretary of the second Record Commission, in which capacity he bought and printed so many books, that the commission's debt exceeded the sum voted by parliament. Henry Vassall-Fox, 3rd Baron Holland recommended him for the post of Solicitor General when Robert Monsey Rolfe was appointed, in 1835.

Cooper enjoyed a leading practice in the court of Vice-chancellor James Lewis Knight-Bruce; but they had a public quarrel, and Cooper lost his reputation. He tried without success to obtain government assistance for a project for digesting all the existing law reports. He retired to Boulogne, and died of paralysis and bronchitis on 26 March 1873.

== Political candidacies ==
Cooper played an active part in public affairs in Kent, where he resided at Denton Court, near Canterbury. He appeared as a parliamentary candidate for Lambeth in 1850, but withdrew from the contest; in 1854 he unsuccessfully contested Canterbury, and was proposed as a candidate for West Kent in 1855, but declined to stand.

== Honours and awards ==
His knowledge of jurisprudence and legal antiquities gained him a fellowship of the Royal Society, and the degree of LL.D. of the universities of Louvain and Kiel. He was also a Fellow of the Society of Antiquaries, and corresponding member of the royal academies of Lisbon, Munich, Berlin, and Brussels. He was elected a member of the American Antiquarian Society in 1835.

== Works ==
Cooper was a voluminous writer. In his later years he published a printed list of 52 pamphlets, written, edited, or printed by him on political topics between 1850 and 1857. His major works were:

- An Account of the Parliamentary Proceedings relating to the Practice in Bankruptcy, Chancery, and the House of Lords, 1828.
- Notes, etc., in French on the Court of Chancery, 1828, 2nd edit. 1830.
- Notes on Registration and forms in Conveyancing, 1831.
- An Account of the Public Records of the United Kingdom, 2 vols. 1832.
- Speech for Rev. C. Wellbeloved in the case of Lady Hewley's Foundation, Attorney-general v. Shore, 1834.
- Notes on the Act for regulating Municipal Corporations, 1835.
- Reports of Cases decided by Lord Brougham in 1833 and 1834 from the original MSS., 1835.
- Reports of Cases decided by Lords Cottenham and Langdale, and by Vice-chancellor Shadwell in 1837 and 1838, with notes 1838–41.
- Reports of Lord Cottenham's decisions, 1846.
- A letter to the Lord Chancellor on defects in the law as to the custody of lunatics, 1849.
- A pamphlet on the reform of solicitors' costs, 1850.
- A letter to Sir George Grey on the sanitary state of St. George's parish, 1850.
- A pamphlet on the condition of the court of chancery, 1850.
- A pamphlet on the masters in chancery.
- A pamphlet on the House of Lords as a court of appeal.
- Chancery Miscellanies under his editorship, Nos. 1–13, 1850 and 1851.
- Parliamentary and political Miscellanies under his editorship, Nos. 1–20, 1851.
- A letter on the pope's Apostolic Letters of 1850, 1851.
- A pamphlet on the Government and the Irish Roman Catholic members, 1851.
- Reports of Cases and Dicta in Chancery from MSS., with notes, Nos. 1–7, 1852.
- Memorandum of a proposal to classify the Law Reports, Boulogne, 1860.
- A similar proposal for digesting the statute-book, Boulogne, 1860.
- On Freemasonry, Folkestone, 1868.

== Legacy ==
Cooper in 1843 presented Lincoln's Inn with two thousand volumes of civil and foreign legal works, having previously presented a hundred and fifty volumes of American law reports.
