= John Baker White (British politician) =

British politician (1902–1988)

John Baker White (12 August 1902 – 10 December 1988) started his career as a Conservative political activist and became a very early member of the British Fascists. He undertook undercover operations for Sir George Makgill's Industrial Intelligence Bureau on behalf of MI5. By 1926, he worked for the Economic League, an industry-sponsored organization committed to undermine left wing militancy. By 1931, he became director of the League. He joined a territorial regiment as an officer immediately before World War II, from where he was recruited to Military Intelligence as a propaganda specialist. In 1945, he was elected a Conservative politician. He was also a journalist and author and his work reveals a colourful, possibly, eccentric personality. His autobiographical writing makes him an important, though never completely reliable, witness to UK parapolitical circles in which he was involved for seventy years.

== Early life and education ==
Baker White was born in 1902. in Malling, Kent the only son of John Wilfred Baker White and his wife Katherine Blythe. They had married in 1899, when Katherine was just 20, and White 22. White's father had died when he was sixteen, and he had inherited the family fortune, which meant he did not need to work, and he did not. Soon after John's birth, his father deserted his mother, and in 1905 ceased living with her completely, spending his time big game hunting in Rhodesia and Canada. In January 1907, Katherine sued for restoration of conjugal rights, ensuring the proceedings attracted substantial newspaper interest. But White refused to meet the 14–day deadline set by the judge. Katherine was consequently granted a divorce. This had been a way of engineering a legal separation at a time when divorce was hard to achieve. Within a couple of years, his father had returned to the UK and settled as a gentleman farmer near Canterbury. Young John Baker White saw and stayed with his father regularly, and his mother and father jointly made decisions about his future.

In 1909, Katherine remarried to Gerald Hartley Atkinson, whom John Baker White knew as "Uncle Tim" — a name he continued to use. Atkinson was forty-two and on the 1911 census describes himself as a Met Police Pensioner.

He grew up with his mother and step-father and a half sister on their nursery garden specialising in gladioli, "The Flagstaff", in Southampton. His own early ambition to join the navy led to his mother and father sending Baker White to a preparatory school, Stubbington House, with reputation for preparing pupils for a naval education. By the time he had finished his preparatory education, his hunger to join the Navy had cooled. In the Autumn 1916, rather pursuing a conventional naval education he went to Malvern College; leaving there in the summer of 1920. During his time in Malvern College in the final stages of the War, he had become accustomed to the idea of a military career but by the time he left in 1920 this was not a promising option. Discussing options with his father, he alighted on the idea of becoming a farmer. Rather than being an unpaid "farmers son" on his father's farm, he arranged a paid position as a boarder and "Farm Pupil" on a farm in Arlington near Eastbourne.

Farming was not a career he seriously followed after his pupillage. His future career would be shaped by the interests and activities and acquaintances of his mother and stepfather during his time as a farm pupil.

After the First World War had started Atkinson, who had worked as a voluntary personal assistant to the Commissioner, Edward Henry, in the early years of the century, returned to work in the Metropolitan police. This time he was assisting the barrister Henry Curtis-Bennett who was responsible for counter espionage interrogations in Special Branch. John Baker White later described how his stepfather and Curtis-Benett gave him a one-off experience as a courier for Special Branch which was to be his first experience working undercover. Baker White tells the story in "True Blue":

"One day in 1920, when "the Troubles" in Ireland were at their height—I had left Malvern and recovered from my appendix operation—Tim said to me, "Would you like a trip to Dublin?" I said yes and in due course went up to the Yard to see him and Curtis-Bennett. He handed me my ticket, a packet of money and a sealed envelope. What I had to do was very simple—cross from Fishguard, and stay at the Shelbourne Hotel. There a Mr. Jacobs would call on me, ostensibly to measure me for a suit, a good enough excuse to be shown up to my bedroom. He would produce, as identification, a set of cloth patterns, and I was to hand him the envelope. It all went according to plan and I returned to England the next day. Two years later Tim told me what was in the envelope and why I had been chosen as courier. It was a letter from the Prime Minister to Michael Collins, the I.R.A. leader, putting forward proposals for a truce. Jacobs, an orthodox Jew, was in the I.R.A. intelligence: both he and Collins had insisted, knowing that they had contacts in the police and other places in Whitehall, that the courier should be someone not remotely connected with any official department."

Shortly after this internship opportunity, Baker White took up his Farm Pupillage. By now his mother, Katherine, was becoming well known in anti-socialist and ultra-conservative social and campaigning circles. The massive extension of the franchise, the Labour Party's relaunch as a democratic socialist party with a mass membership, and by 1920 the appearance of the Communist Party of Great Britain (CPGB) had galvanised the opposition from existing anti-socialist organisations, and triggered the creation of new ones. These different organisations might have different focuses, but few if any ideological differences. They were Conservative Party supporting, anti-communist and anti-socialist platforms. There was within these circles a cohort of diehard and radical young Conservatives attracted to the aggressive anti-communism and anti socialism of Mussolini's Fascisti in Italy After the success of Mussolini's March on Rome they would go on to create the British Fascists.

In 1921, one of these groups, the Middle Class Union, which had initially been strike-breaking organisation, changed its name to the National Citizens Union (NCU). By 1923, newspapers were reporting that both Katherine Atkinson, who had her own campaign, the League of Service, and her 21–year–old son, John, were addressing meetings of the NCU. Katherine is reported as a keynote speaking against Bolshevism at a large meeting in Stratford on Avon alongside Lady Asquith.

In February of that year, John Baker White was reported addressing a meeting of the Canterbury NCU, also about "Bolshevism". He tackles head on the issue of the "temerity" of someone his age doing this by invoking the sprits of the Fascists.

"Mr Baker White quoted the example of the Fascisti, who had saved Italy from Communism, and pointed out that most of the Fascisti were young men under 30 years of age"

In his autobiography, Baker White explained that by 1923, with no sign of financial support from his father for the rental of a farm, he had decided to abandon his ambition to farm. Katherine Atkinson was by this time a friend of, and collaborator with, Nesta Webster, a prominent anti-socialist and antisemitic conspiracy theorist, and promoter of the Protocols of the Elders of Zion. He describes how, inspired in discussions with them and incensed by the insults and criticisms of them by left wing opponents, he was developing a vocation to oppose communism.

His engagement in the NCU was part of his pursuit of that vocation. But at the same time, he was also attending public meeting of the CPGB in plain clothes, but passing himself off as a student. It was after one of these expeditions that he was identified as a possible recruit by one of the CPGB students, who was themselves working undercover for the anti communist cause.

== Career ==
=== Industrial Intelligence Bureau / Section D ===
The role of Sir George Makgill's private anti-socialist intelligence service in the 1920s first emerged in 1993 and 1994. Official confirmation only came fifteen years later with the Publication of Christopher Andrew's "Defence of the Realm" the authorised history of MI5. The only evidence for such a service was to be found in Baker White's 1970 autobiography "True Blue" and he was, by the time he died in 1988, a fairly peripheral figure in the radical right. The Economic League, which he had run and written about, was still in existence, and shocking revelations were emerging of a massive blacklisting operation run by it for over fifty years.

The story of the undercover espionage in which Baker White had engaged in the 1920s and 1930s, while according to his own accounts he been "running" the League, caught the attention of a few historical researchers. In "True Blue" he attributed the operation to a figure called George McGill he also referred to as "G". There was no record of anyone called George McGill being active in the radical right at the time he was writing about, or earlier when the League was formed. However, a Scottish historian researching employers organisations, Arthur McIvor, had published a paper in 1988 specifically examining the early history of the Economic League and identifying close links with another other organisations of the radical right during and immediately after the Great War. The most significant was the British Commonwealth Union, which had previously been called The British Empire Union, whose main wartime spokesman was Sir George Makgill whose profile matched that in Baker White's lightly disguised profile.

When MI5 confirmed through Andrew the broad outline of Hughes' and Hope's revelations, they also added a sort of definitive name for the organisation, and expanded on the rates of the British Fascists. But they left unanswered questions about the scope of the organisation, and its relationship to the British Fascists it remains ambiguous.

The two people who have written with personal knowledge of "G's" organisation are Baker White in his autobiographical works, and Maxwell Knight in a note afterwards and left in the MI5 archive. Neither source is entirely reliable. Baker White renames individuals, including Makgill himself.

The purpose of Knight's written account was to explain how he came to be playing a leading role in the British fascisti while serving as a MI5 officer:

In 1924 at the request of the late Sir George Makgill Bt who was then running agents on behalf of Sir Vernon Kell I joined the first of the Fascist Movements in this country – The British Fascisti. Vernon Kell, the director of MI5, had its postwar budget and staffing more than decimated, and could no longer run conventional agents. He relied on previous employees to work as temporary contractors. Therefore, Makgill's willingness to help was extraordinarily helpful. In 1924, Kell's primary target was not newly forming BFs, but their principal target the CPGB, But Maxwell Knight was not recruited as mere rank and file fascisti. He was immediately appointed as chief of staff and director of intelligence.

Christoper Andrew names Makgill's organisation the Industrial Intelligence Bureau, but no organisation with that name has been identified elsewhere. IIB had three members of its Section D in positions of power within the BF. The story, as told by Andrew and MI5, is that soon after Knight's recruitment, six BF agents were recruited to successfully infiltrate the CPGB, which they did successfully.

Baker White later recalled that when Sir George Makgill died suddenly in 1926, he and Maxwell Knight decided at once to keep Section D active under Baker White's direction through for the remainder of the 1920s and 1930s.

Neither of them knew the full extent of Makgill's undercover operations, but they were aware that Section D was not restricted to industrial intelligence gathering and even in Makgill's lifetime had investigated Aleister Crowley and the IRA. When in the 1930s Baker White finally became director of the Economic League other than consolidated the Industrial intelligence function of allowing Section D develop international activities.

=== British Fascists ===
Fourteen months after his address to the Canterbury NCU, the British Fascisti were created on May 6, 1924. The British Fascisti described itself as not politically affiliated, but it only operated inside the Conservative Party and it did not oppose it. It soon attracted the support of Conservative nobles and big names, but the members of its executive committee were reticent about publicity.

In Portsmouth, this caused problems for Capt. A. G. Wright R.N. who was trying to establish a branch in Farlington, but had found some reluctance because the names of the executive were not public. At the next meeting, he was able to confirm the names of the executive, which include John Baker White as Director of Departments and his mother as Director of Social Propaganda. They were not however the only parent-and-offspring members. Mrs and Miss Lintorn-Arman (sic) are also listed as Founders. Rotha Linton-Orman was only seven years Baker White's senior, and she would remain his close associate until her death in 1935 when she was just forty.

This was Baker White's first recorded public role in the radical right, but there is no explanation of his executive responsibilities, if any, as "Director of Departments". It is also unclear how long he remained on the executive of the BFs, which was later in 1924 renamed its Grand Council. But by 1925, he was working in the public relations department of the Mine Owners Association of Great Britain, from where he was recruited to work in the Economic League in 1926. In neither role would he have as much time to devote to executive functions as he had with the BFs.

Those moves coincided with the appointment of Maxwell Knight, a future MI5 officer, as the British Fascisti's Chief of Staff and Director of Intelligence. The association between Rotha Lintorn Orman, Maxwell Knight and John Baker White had predated the formation of the British Fascisti in 1924.

=== Mining Association of Great Britain ===
To date, most of the pursuit of his anti-communist vocation had been unpaid, although he later recalled he was earning around two guineas a week for his freelance journalism. He heard from a friend that the Mining Association was looking for a writer to join the public relations department. The Mining Association of Great Britain was the mine owners and employers association. Phillip Gee was the head of its Public Relations Department, and its chief Executive was Maj Hugh Gillespie. Its President was Sir Evan Williams, a south Wales mine owner and a founder member in 1919 of the Economic League. Baker White was initially interviewed by Gee, who told him that the final position would be conditional on him working in a pit for six months. He was then taken to meet the Chief Exec who confirmed that following his six month probationary period as a mine worker he would be given the post as Gee's assistant. In his autobiography, he writes about this experience living in digs with a conservative underground miner at Newstead Pit in Nottinghamshire. He writes sympathetically about the lives and work of the miners, though not about their union or ambition for nationalisation. After six months in Nottingham he returns to work in the headquarters of the Association in King Street in Covent Garden.

He did not spend long in the Mining Association, although he was to spend the next decade and a half alongside Evan Williams and Phillip Gee. As the time approached for the General Strike he was being interviewed successfully in April for a role in the Economic League. The strike started in the first week of May and was over in eight days. Baker White says little about his role during the strike, though it was over so quickly there may never have been a role to report.

=== Economic League ===
Baker White had been married to Irene Graham in October 1925, and he was anxious to increase his income to support his new married life. His own account of how he came to work for the Economic League is mysteriously misleading. He tells us "Irene brought me luck because I applied for, and much to my surprise got, the job of Director of the Economic League. I was appointed in April 1926."

He did go to work for the League after the General Strike, but not as its Director, that was not a role he would take up on a permanent basis until 1933. In 1932, he signs himself in letters to newspapers as "acting director". In 1929, he describes himself as "assistant director" and before that, in August 1928, The Roscommon Herald describes him as "Secretary of the Economic League". The League's Director throughout this period was King's Counsel, Archibald E. Crawford, and after he relinquished the role he joined the League's Central Council.

When he first joined the League in the aftermath of the General Strike the coal strike continued until the Autumn. In the Nottinghamshire coalfield, where Baker White had been recently working, a breakaway union had been formed by a miner called George Spencer. Baker White explains how the League responded:

"....the efforts of the Economic League were directed towards getting the miners back to work. A special flying squad, called the Constitutional Workers and equipped with vans and leaflets, was set up. Some members of it were fully trained League speakers, others were recruited, somewhat hurriedly, and mainly from unemployed ex-officers including two ex-Black and Tans who were habitués of Rayners Bar in the Haymarket.

After the collapse of the coal strike, Baker White tells us "I settled down to the daily routine of running the Economic League. Irene and I also settled down to living up to our income". But contrary to this suggestion, his role at the would be anything but routine. Makgill would shortly be dead, and the section that he was going to continue to run would need to be secured within the work of the Economic League. The MI5 and Kell would need to continue to have access to Knight's BF infiltrators. Amidst the chaos of the General Strike and its aftermath, the League had been approached by a Swiss lawyer, hoping to persuade them to become the British chapter of a newly forming international collaboration against the Comintern. The Central Council agreed, and the newly appointed John Baker White had been put forward as its representative to the organisation.

When War broke out in 1939, Baker White was immediately called up. He passed the day to day directorial responsibilities to Tom Gribble and when the war ended he entered Parliament his former Deputy Robert Rawdon Hoare, recently demobilised, became the first postwar permanent Director he maintained his close connections with the League on publications and publicity for the rest of his life.

=== Transnational Anti-communism ===
There is a growing interest among historians in The Transnational Radical Right Anti-communist radical right, between the Russian Revolution and the start of World War Two. The movement did not disappear as a result of the defeat of fascism in Germany and Italy, but the fervently anti-Soviet cross-border organisations and alliances that emerged during the Cold War were very different to those between the Wars.

The transnational anti-communist radical right did not emerge until the end of the Russian Civil War in 1923. The civil war was decisively won by the Soviet Army, and was lost by the Russian White Movement despite the support of France. Britain, Japan, the US. Within Russia, the Bolsheviks had also faced the opposition from groups isolated from the White Movement, which included more libertarian socialist opponents, peasant up-risings and nationalist independence movements. These were all crushed, although Finland secured its independence.

The death of the White Movement led to the displacement of 1.5m White Russian supporters by 1923 westward into the Balkans and Western Europe. The White Movement was profoundly conservative, suspicious of democracy, and anti-socialist as well as anti-communist. Most were also inclined to activism and determined to prevent any European rapprochement with the Soviet state.

The first and possibly best-funded attempt to create a platform for trans-national anti-communist was a scheme devised by right wing political active Geneva lawyer Théodore Aubert and White Russian émigré Dr Georges Lodygensky, formerly a military surgeon then working for the Russian Red Cross.

The two men's paths had crossed when Aubert had recently successfully defended a White Russian who had assassinated a soviet diplomat in Switzerland. Their idea was to create an anti-communist international, mobilising ultra-conservatives, newly forming fascist movements, and the anti-Soviet White Russian emigrees.

The idea was that anti-communist international would work like the Comintern. There would be an international committee with representatives from each of the states involved, this would meet together at least once a year in a general assembly. This international organisation would be administered by a Permanent Bureau headed up by Lodygensky. The first meeting to establish it happened in Paris on June 23, 1924, and this consisted of 20 key activists for from each of the target countries. This core group agreed to a constitution and a name – in English. The international Entente against the Third International, in French the Entente internationale anticommuniste.

The Permanent Bureau would also be responsible for establishing national centres in the countries represented In1925 Aubert met with The Economic League asked to be the British Centre and they agreed. Responsibility for it was attached to Baker White's job description when he moved from the Mining Association to The Economic League.

By the time that Baker White was setting up, the British Centre of the EIA was already publishing a monthly "International Anti-Bolshevik Review". But the one published in March 1926 had been an illustrated and substantial document, extending to over 120 pages. Profiled profiles of Bolshevism in each of all the countries represented on the International Committee. Its production just pre-dates the Economic League's involvement and is contributed by Dr Arthur Shadwell, a freelance journalist who been working for The Times. His article is entitled Bolshevism in Great Britain and can be read in full in Warwick University's online copy.

In the early stage of its development, Britain was represented on the International Committee by Miss Dorothy Handbury from the Truman's brewing dynasty and Lord Malmsberry. The evidence from Baker White's autobiographical accounts of Section D would suggest that he threw himself into his European transnational anti-communist mission, not merely keeping Makgill's organisation ticking over, but refreshing and expanding it.

The 1924 special edition of the Anti-Bolshevik Review was full of praise for the Facisti in Italy, But this was the at the height of the Weimar Republic and the Review has nothing to say of the Nazis in Germany, or of the BFs which were at that just being established in Britain. Although the Economic League were providing the British centre, the political leadership on the International Committee was drawn from the Die-Hard faction in the Conservative Party By the end of its pre-World War Ii existence the Entente would be funded by German and Italian Fascists leading to the resignation of the Duchess of Atholl from the International Committee over fascist funding, just as The Entente were publishing Baker White's "The Red Network".

But by 1933 it was that Fascism was not develop in Britain as it had in continental Europe. Hitler was in power in Germany and it was only a matter time before it included Austria. In Portugal Salazar was already prime Minister and was introducing a totalitarian constitution.

In Britain, the founders of the BFs were firmly committed to finding a place for Fascist anti-communism within the Conservative Party. Although there was a substantial section of the Conservative Party who were "Die Hard"s and who supported this approach, being tethered to a democratically elected party hampered the BFs ability to mobilise popular anti-communist support and or to convince Conservatives to adopt a more populist social and economic measures.

By 1930, the BFs were in decline and Rotha Lintorn-Orman was increasingly unwell and not able to breathe new life in the party. By 1932, a membership of once two to three thousand had dwindled to barely 100.

In 1931, Oswald Mosley and six other disillusioned Labour MPs joined him to set up a new party in the Commons called "The New Party". Unable to establish a clear identity for themselves before a snap election was called, The New Party lost all their seats. Things were worse for the Labour Party proper, which had expelled the Prime Minister Ramsay MacDonald and his followers in National Labour. They lost 235 of their 287 seats. A year later, in October 1932, The New Party was relaunched as the British Union of Fascists.

By 1933, Aubert, who would soon become a spokesman for Fascism in Switzerland, was disappointed with the way transnational anti-communism had developed in Britain, and Baker Whites' and the Economic League's development of the centre. It is not explained how Aubert came to be put in touch with Sir Waldron Smithers and a month later with Lord Phillimore, but he recruited them to revitalise the Entente's cause in Britain. Aubert wrote to Smithers explaining his concerns and the historian Michel Caillat summarises that letter held in the Geneva archives of the EIA as:

The Economic League's activities as the EIA's British centre were of a modest character. Baker White confined himself to transmitting information and documents to those concerned with combating Bolshevism, whether they were in government, parliament, economic or patriotic organisations, or simply were individuals he thought worth mobilising. In April 1933 Aubert also secured the assistance of the Conservative MP Waldron Smithers, and a month later, with the collaboration of Lord Phillimore, set up a committee to 'promote Britain's participation in the struggle against Moscow at the international level.'

Baker White is unlikely to have been put out by Aubert's apparent vote of no confidence. Smithers and Phillimore were well-known Conservative Die Hards but neither seems to have any connection to the League before being recruited by Aubert. Smithers had joined Parliament in 1924 in his father's former constituency of Chislehurst near Bromley on the outskirts of London. In Parliament, he immediately associated with the Die Hard faction and, although he was only ever a back bencher in the thirty years he was in the commons, he was a more than competent publicist for himself and the radical right wing causes he supported. The number of entries for him in the British Newspaper Archives is testament to this.

Although there is no date for when Smithers joined the Central Council of the Economic League, its governing body, he was already on it by the time the 1946 Annual Report was published, and when a Limited Liability Company was formed in 1951, he was one of its sponsors.

=== The Road To War ===
Despite being ultra-conservative economically, politically and socially, the League had maintained the conceit that it was politically neutral. Not coincidentally, the BFs and IEIA would also male this same argument for themselves in 1924.

After he became Director in 1932, Baker White. while continuer to propagate the conceit. Yet under his directorship, he and the Economic League had increasingly associated itself with, and promoted, a particular position in respect of appeasement. That position started with the appeasement notion of understanding why Nazi Germany was doing what it was doing during the 1930s. What that was, was re-arming. That was a problem because, the argument went, the answer to a former enemy state re-arming was not pacifism. Nor was it a solution to aggressively enforce demilitarisation two decades after the end of the conflict. The solution was to re-arm yourselves.

Baker White had been visiting Germany for the Economic League and Section D since the days of the Weimar Republic. He had very senior contacts at Krupps, the largest German Arms manufacturer. Although he does not tell us how often he visited, it must have been at least annually. In 1937, he also attended the Nuremberg rally with his wife as honoured guests of the Nazi Party. There were two immediate outcomes of this. The first was a book, "Dover-Nürnberg, Return". The second was the creation of the Economic Youth Movement.

In his book, Baker White was lavish in his praise of Hitler calling him "a great man" with "very great ability, courage and perseverance". He emphasised Hitler's achievement arguing that he had brought Germany back from "...the depths and given it back its soul. He has done more, he has given it that precious thing, self-confidence, and hope in the future."

Baker White says his objective in writing the book was "to remove causes of misunderstanding" and goes on to say:

"... false statement, especially when accompanied by malicious cartoons, only serves to prevent two great nations understanding one another a little better. Be this said for the German People. They are making greater efforts to understand us than we are to understand them."

He also plays down Nazi antisemitism:

"[I] found no evidence of bitter anti-jewish feeling amongst the ordinary people and no support among the mass of the Nazi party for Streicher's campaign".

In October 1937 the Cheshire Observer carried an account of the new Economic League development:

A gathering of over 450 assembled for the opening meeting of the Economic Youth Movement, in Manchester, to hear Mr. J. Baker White, director of the Economic League Central Council, give his impressions of his recent visit to the Nuremberg conference. Mr. H. E. D. Mabbott, chairman of the Economic League, of which Lt. Col. Sir Alan Sykes is president. was in the chair.

Mr. Baker White urged that people should disabuse themselves of the idea that the principles and policy of the Hitler Youth and Labour Service could be applied In Britain, where conditions were utterly different than in Germany. He made a point that the two countries should do everything within their power to arrive at greater mutual understanding.

Major R. R. Hoare, Regional Director of the Lancashire and Cheshire area, gave an address on the objects of the Economic Youth Movement.

With the declaration of war not two years away, the Economic League under Baker White's leadership was beginning to look like a Nazi "fellow traveller", and it was leaving it late to accomplish any sort of "volte-face". And in the end they would end leave it to the last moment.

Previously, in 1935 in an attempt to undermine the anti-fascist and pacifist propaganda of the "united front" movement in Britain The Economic League had issued a pamphlet called "The Innocents Clubs". They were suggesting these front organisations were just a cloak for communist activity. On March 4 the Yorkshire Post mentioned its publication:

"THE INNOCENTS' CLUBS" Though it fairly well known that a good deal of seemingly genuine antiwar and antiFascist propaganda serves in reality as a cloak for militant Communist activities. Mr J. Baker White has performed useful piece work compiling entitled "The Innocents' Clubs." exposing Hie range and methods subversive organisations which shelter behind harmless sounding names. The "clubs" with which Mr White include ,,,, The relief Committee for Victims of Austrian and German Fascism"

In their first main attempt at an eleventh-hour volte-face, they issued a memorandum ostensibly on "German Propaganda in Britain". But while it identified some German propaganda organisations, the whole weight of the criticism in the memorandum was focussed on pacifism generally, and most particularly the Peace Pledge Union. Their memorandum received a lot of uncritical press coverage, especially in local conservative newspapers, which enabled Baker White to later claim that they had been anti-fascist campaigners in the 1930s, when not much could have been further from the truth.

The final contribution to the volte-face came two weeks later when on the 30 July 1939 the Sunday Graphic published an exclusive article by John Baker, which was trailed in a great many other papers and was something of a personal triumph for him:

SECRETS OF THE GERMAN AIR FORCE

By JOHN BAKER WHITE

Exactly how strong is the German air force? How does it compare with ours in pilots and in machines?

These are questions we all want answered. They are answered in the next SUNDAY GRAPHIC by John Baker White, Britain's foremost military authority, in a fascinating article in which he reveals production secrets of Germany's air force.

As a fascist and radical anti-communist, Baker White had indeed secured privileged access to information about Nazi re-armament. But privileged access was no substitute for professional military service and time working in weapons development and manufacture. His wartime experience would have been different if he had been called out for his pre-war political beliefs by one of his then colleagues, and had he not been promoted by an over excites sub or copywriter to the role of "Britain's foremost military authority".

=== World War 2 ===
==== London Rifles ====
Other than a few years in the Officer Training Corps at Malvern College, Baker White had no military experience. In 1935 he enlisted in a territorial unit, the London Rile Brigade which recruited mainly from the City of London. When his commission as a 2nd Lieutenant came through was made a platoon leader in the Lloyds Company. He had a bit more than three very part time to learn some soldiering skills at annual camp and evening or weekend sessions. By his own account it was some time before they would have real weapons in their hands.

When War seemed inevitable he arranged for one of his older El workers, Maj Tom Gribble to take over his responsibilities as Director and the day after the declaration he was on duty guarding the German Embassy.

==== MI9 ====
In December 1939 a new military intelligence unit was set up – MI9 - to deal with weapons intelligence and counter sabotage. It would later have other responsibilities, but it was in these first months in 1940 that Baker White's experience with Krupps was most valuable to MI9.

This was a particularly early transfer into an intelligence unit and it would ensure that he would never be far from London during the whole of the War.

==== MoI ====
Towards the end of 1941 after MI9 had extracted maximum value from him he was transferred to work in propaganda (white, black and grey) in Ministry of Information section based in the Senate House of London University,

==== PWE ====
When the Political Warfare Executive (PWE) was established in August 1941 to lead Black Propaganda operations from a base in Woburn Abbey which is where he ended his war; being demobilised immediately after he won the Canterbury seat in the 1945 general election.

There is no doubt that his political career was cleaved in two by the Second World War or that the evidence from the first half of that career is a more authentic representation of what John Baker White stood for and believed. The war was an opportunity for redemption, and in vigorously deploying against the Nazis the tricks of political deception and manipulation that he had learnt before it he seized hat opportunity with both hands.

His career after the War demonstrated that he learned nothing and that he moved on, doing his best to misrepresent and revise the history of the radical British right between the Wars and the far from insignificant part he played.

=== House of Commons ===
He was elected Member of Parliament for Canterbury in the 1945 general election and served until 1953, when he left Parliament through the method of becoming Steward of the Manor of Northstead. The subsequent by-election was won by Leslie Thomas

=== Back on the land ===
In 1966, he finally managed to put his farm pupilage to use to establish a 6,000 acre family farm in Kent.

He maintained his connection to the Economic League and in the 1960s was described as a publicity consultant. He was also chair of The Freedom Association in Kent.

== Publications ==
=== Polemical works ===
- "Red Russia Arms", Burrup Mathieson, 1932
- "The Innocents' Clubs" (pamphlet), John Baker White, 1935
- "The Red Network", International Anti-Communist Entente, 1939
- "Nationalisation: Chaos or Cure?", Forum Books, 1946
- "The Soviet Spy System", Falcon Press, 1948
- "Pattern for Conquest [On Russian intrigue and espionage in Europe since 1945]", Robert Hale, 1956

=== Autobiographical Works ===
- "Dover-Nürnberg, Return", Burrup Mathieson, 1937
- "Its gone for Good", Vacher & Sons, 1941
- "A Soldier Dares to Think", Vacher, 1942
- "The Big Lie", Evans Bros, 1955
- "Sabotage is Suspected", Evans Bros, 1957
- "True Blue", Frederick Muller, 1970

Parliament of the United Kingdom
Preceded by Sir William Wayland	Member of Parliament for Canterbury; 1945 – 1953	Succeeded by Leslie Thomas
