= John Creking =

14th-century English politician

John Creking (died ca. 1405), of Canterbury, Kent, was an English politician.

== Family ==
Creking was married to a woman named Alice; they had two sons.

== Career ==
Creking was a member of parliament for Canterbury constituency in October 1377, 1378, 1385 and September 1388.
