= Henry Lynde =

English politician

Henry Lynde (died 1427 or 1428) of Canterbury, Kent, was an English politician.

== Family ==
Lynde was the eldest son of John Lynde, who died c. 1399, and his wife, Joan. Henry Lynde married twice, first to Joan Hacche of Canterbury, who died 21 November 1417; secondly to Katherine, by whom he had two daughters.

== Career ==
Lynde was a Member of Parliament for Canterbury, Kent in 1410, March 1416, 1417 and 1427.
