= 1953 Canterbury by-election =

UK Parliamentary by-election

The 1953 Canterbury by-election was held on 12 February 1953. It was held due to the resignation of the incumbent Conservative MP, Baker White. The by-election was won by the Conservative candidate Leslie Thomas.

By-election 1953: Canterbury
Party	Candidate	Votes	%	±%
Conservative	Leslie Thomas	19,400	66.99	+5.90
Labour	JAE Jones	9,560	33.01	+1.98
Majority		9,840	33.98	+3.92
Turnout		28,960		
Conservative hold		Swing	+3.94	
