= John Mendham =

English politician (??–c.1394)

John Mendham (died ca. 1394), of Canterbury, Kent, was an English politician.

== Family ==
Mendham married a woman named Margaret, who died ca. 1395; they had one daughter.

== Career ==
Mendham was a Member of Parliament for Canterbury in February 1388.
