= Canterbury (constituency) =

Parliamentary constituency in the United Kingdom, 1295 onwards

Coordinates: 51°18′N 1°3′E

- County constituency for the House of Commons
- Interactive map of boundaries from 2024
- Boundary of Canterbury in South East England
- Local government in South East England: Kent
- Population: 109,280 (2011 census)
- Electorate: 71,171 (2024)
- Major settlements: Canterbury, Whitstable, Swalecliffe, Chestfield

Current constituency
- Created: 1918
- Member of Parliament: Rosie Duffield (Independent)
- Seats: One
- Created from: St Augustine's, Canterbury (Borough)
- During its existence contributed to new seat(s) of: Folkestone and Hythe (1950), North Thanet (1983)

Canterbury
- Former borough constituency for the House of Commons
- Local government in South East England: Kent
- Major settlements: Canterbury

1295–1918
- Seats: 1295–1885: Two; 1885–present: One
- Replaced by: Canterbury (County)

Canterbury is a constituency (Note: A county constituency (for the purposes of election expenses and type of returning officer)) in Kent, represented in the House of Commons of the UK Parliament since 2017 by Rosie Duffield, formerly of the Labour Party, and since September 2024, an independent. (Note: As with all constituencies, the constituency elects one Member of Parliament (MP) by the first past the post system of election at least once every five years.)

The seat dates to the earliest century of regular parliaments, in 1295; it elected two MPs until 1885, electing one thereafter, before being altered by the Representation of the People Act 1918 (the later-termed "Fourth Reform Act", the first being in 1832).

== Constituency profile ==
The Canterbury constituency is located in Kent and covers most of the City of Canterbury local government district. It includes the historic cathedral city of Canterbury, with a population of around 55,000, and a large rural area surrounding the city and meeting the coast at the town of Whitstable. Canterbury is an important religious centre; the city is the seat of the Archbishop of Canterbury, the ceremonial head of the worldwide Anglican Communion, and the city's main religious sites together hold UNESCO World Heritage status. Canterbury also hosts three universities (the University of Kent, University for the Creative Arts and Canterbury Christ Church University) and has the highest student-to-permanent-resident ratio in the country.

Compared to national averages, residents of the constituency are younger and have high levels of education and professional employment. Most of the constituency is affluent, however there are high levels of deprivation in parts of Canterbury, particularly in the north-east of the city. White people make up 86% of the population. At the local city and county council levels, the city of Canterbury is mostly represented by Labour Party councillors whilst the rural areas of the constituency have predominantly elected Liberal Democrats. Voters in the constituency mostly supported remaining in the European Union in the 2016 referendum; an estimated 54% supported remaining compared to 48% nationwide.

== History ==
Constitutional status of seat

The current Canterbury seat is constituted as a county constituency and was formed in 1918 from an expansion of the narrow parliamentary borough (or simply borough) of the same name that existed from 1295 to 1918. This had elected two MPs from 1295 (the Model Parliament) until 1885, and then one until 1918.

Political history

Before the seat was reformed the politics of the town were greatly influenced by Canterbury Cathedral and the Archbishop of Canterbury.

MP representation in the constituency was suspended between 1880 and 1885, following a corruption scandal in which bribery was found to have been extensively used in the re-election of the two sitting Conservative MPs, and the result was overturned. Following the Corrupt and Illegal Practices Prevention Act 1883 and the Redistribution of Seats Act 1885, representation was resumed at the 1885 general election, when the number of MPs returned was reduced from two to one.

From 1835 (where a Conservative was elected on petition) until 2017, the local electorate elected mostly candidates of the Conservative Party (with the exceptions of the elections of Independent Unionist Francis Bennett-Goldney, MP from 1910 to 1918, and of a few Whigs or Liberals when Canterbury had two seats); the seat was recognised in the Guinness Book of World Records as the longest uninterrupted period of one party holding a Parliamentary seat. The election of Labour's Rosie Duffield, who won the seat by just 187 votes in the 2017 election, marked the end of a 185-year period of Canterbury almost always electing Conservative-allied MPs, the longest recorded unbroken record of party representation in British political history. Her victory in this election was largely credited to the strategies of electoral strategist Jack Wilson, who at the time was the youngest senior political adviser in British history.

Duffield kept the seat at the 2019 election, increasing her majority – one of only a handful of seats to swing to Labour. At the 2024 election, her majority increased substantially following the collapse of the Conservative vote.

== Boundaries ==
Map of boundaries 2010–2024

1918–1950: The County Borough of Canterbury, the Urban Districts of Herne Bay and Whitstable, the Rural Districts of Bridge and Elham, and the Rural District of Blean with the detached parts of the parishes of Dunkirk and Hernhill which were wholly surrounded by the rural district.

1950–1983: The County Borough of Canterbury, the Urban Districts of Herne Bay and Whitstable, and the Rural District of Bridge Blean.

1983–1997: The City of Canterbury wards of Barham Downs, Barton, Blean Forest, Chartham, Chestfield, Gorrell, Harbledown, Harbour, Little Stour, Marshside, Northgate, North Nailbourne, St Stephen's, Seasalter, Stone Street, Sturry North, Sturry South, Swalecliffe, Tankerton, Westgate, and Wincheap, and the Borough of Swale wards of Boughton and Courtenay.

1997–2010: as 1983 less the two Borough of Swale wards.

2010–2024: The City of Canterbury wards of Barham Downs, Barton, Blean Forest, Chartham and Stone Street, Chestfield and Swalecliffe, Gorrell, Harbledown, Harbour, Little Stour, North Nailbourne, Northgate, St Stephen's, Seasalter, Sturry North, Sturry South, Tankerton, Westgate, and Wincheap.

2024–present: The City of Canterbury wards of Barton; Blean Forest; Chartham & Stone Street; Chestfield; Gorrell; Little Stour & Adisham; Nailbourne; Northgate; St. Stephens; Seasalter; Swalecliffe; Tankerton; Westgate; and Wincheap.

Electorate reduced to bring it within the permitted range by transferring Sturry to the new seat of Herne Bay and Sandwich.

== Members of Parliament ==
MPs 1295–1660 — MPs 1660–1880 — MPs 1885–1918 — MPs 1918–present — Elections — See also — Notes and references

=== MPs 1295–1660 ===
Parliament	First member	Second member
1386	Thomas Holt	John Symme
1388 (February)	John Mendham	William Ellis
1388 (September)	John Creking	John Wimpole
1390 (January)	Thomas Lincoln	Thomas Ickham
1390 (November)		
1391	Edmund Horne	John Proude
1393	John Sexton	Richard Gervays
1394	John Proude	Robert Farthing
1395	William Ellis	Thomas Ickham
1397 (January)	Richard Gervays	John Sexton
1397 (September)	Edmund Horne	Robert Farthing
1399	John Sheldwich I	Thomas Lane
1401	Thomas Ickham	John Pirie
1402	John Sheldwich I	Robert Cooper
1404 (January)	Thomas Chicche	John Sexton
1404 (October)	John Umfray	John Haute
1406	Edmund Horne	Richard Water
1407	John Sexton	Richard Water
1410	Thomas Lane	Henry Lynde
1411	William Ickham	William Rose
1413 (February)	William Lane	John Sheldwich II
1413 (May)	Thomas Lane	William Emery
1414 (April)	Richard Water	John Sheldwich II
1414 (November)	Thomas Lane	John Sheldwich II
1415	John Sheldwich II	
1416 (March)	Henry Lynde	John Sheldwich II
1416 (October)	William Ickham	William Benet
1417	John Sheldwich II	Henry Lynde
1419	John Monyn	John Sheldwich II
1420	William Benet	William Ickham
1421 (May)	John Sheldwich II	William Lane
1421 (December)	Thomas Langdon	Thomas Norman
1425	William Benet	
1435	William Benet	
1450	William Benet	
1483	Sir George Browne (died 1483)	
1489	John Crysp	
1504	Thomas Atwode	
1510	William Crump	Thomas Atwode
1512	Thomas Wainfleet	John Hales I
1515	Thomas Atwode	John Hales I
1523	Christopher Hales	John Bridges
1529	Thomas Atwode, died and replaced February 1535 by Robert Darknall	John Bridges
1536	Robert Darknall	John Bridges
1539	John Starkey	Robert Lewis
1542	Robert Darknall	Walter Hendley
1545	Robert Lewis	?
1547	Robert Darknall	Thomas Hales
1553 (March)	Robert Darknall	George Webbe
1553 (October)	John Twyne	William Coppyn
1554 (April)	John Twyne	William Coppyn
1554 (November)	Nicholas Fish	Richard Railton
1558	Sir Henry Crispe	William Roper
1558/59	Sir Thomas Finch	George Maye
1562/63	William Lovelace	Robert Alcock
1571	William Lovelace}	Robert Alcock
1572	Anthony Webbe, died and replaced 1582 by Sir George Carey	William Lovelace, died and replaced 1578 by ?
1584	Simon Brome	John Rose
1586	Simon Brome	John Rose
1588	Simon Brome	Bartholomew Brome
1593	Richard Lee	Sir Henry Finch
1597	John Boys	Sir Henry Finch
1601	John Boys	John Rogers II
1604	John Boys	Matthew Hadde
1614	George Newman	Sir William Lovelace
1621–1622	John Finch	Sir Robert Newington
1624	Thomas Scott	Thomas Denn
1625	John Fisher	Sir Thomas Wilsford
1626	Sir John Finch	James Palmer
1628–1629	Sir John Finch	Thomas Scott
1629–1640	No Parliaments summoned	
1640 (April)	Edward Masters	John Nutt
1640 (November)	Sir Edward Masters	John Nutt
1645	Sir Edward Masters	John Nutt
1648	Sir Edward Masters	John Nutt
1653	Canterbury not represented in Barebones Parliament	
1654	Thomas Scot	Francis Butcher
1656	Thomas St Nicholas	Vincent Denne
1659	Thomas St Nicholas	Robert Gibbon
1659	Sir Edward Masters	John Nutt

Back to Members of Parliament

=== MPs 1660–1880 ===
Election	First member	Party	Second member	Party
1660	Sir Anthony Aucher		Heneage Finch	
1661	Francis Lovelace		Sir Edward Master	
1664	Thomas Hardres		Sir Edward Master	
February 1679	Edward Hales		William Jacob	
August 1679	Edward Hales		Sir Thomas Hardres	
1681	Lewis Watson		Vincent Denne	
1685	Sir William Honywood, Bt		Henry Lee	
1695	Sir William Honywood, Bt		George Sayer	
1698	Henry Lee		George Sayer	
1705	Henry Lee		John Hardres	
1708	Edward Watson		Thomas D'Aeth	
1710	John Hardres		Henry Lee	
1715	John Hardres		Sir Thomas Hales, Bt	
1722	Samuel Milles		Sir Thomas Hales, Bt	
1727	Sir William Hardres, Bt		Sir Thomas Hales, Bt	
1734	Sir William Hardres, Bt		Thomas May	
1735	Sir Thomas Hales, Bt		Thomas May	
1741	Thomas Watson		Thomas Best	
1746 by-election	Sir Thomas Hales, Bt		Thomas Best	
1747	Matthew Robinson		Thomas Best	
1754	Matthew Robinson		Sir James Creed	
1761	Richard Milles		Thomas Best	
1768	Richard Milles		William Lynch	
1774	Richard Milles		Sir William Mayne	
1780	George Gipps		Charles Robinson	
1790	George Gipps		Sir John Honywood, Bt	
1796	John Baker	Whig	Samuel Elias Sawbridge	Whig
Election declared void 2 March 1797
March 1797 by-election	John Baker	Whig	Samuel Elias Sawbridge	Whig
May 1797	Sir John Honywood, Bt	Tory	George Gipps	Tory
1800 by-election	Sir John Honywood, Bt	Tory	George Watson	
1802	John Baker	Whig	George Watson	
1806	John Baker	Whig	James Simmons	
February 1807 by-election	John Baker	Whig	Samuel Elias Sawbridge	Whig
May 1807	John Baker	Whig	Edward Taylor	Whig
1812	John Baker	Whig	Stephen Rumbold Lushington	Tory
1818	Edward Bligh	Whig	Stephen Rumbold Lushington	Tory
1830	Richard Watson	Whig	George Cowper	Whig
Jan 1835	Albert Denison	Whig	Frederick Villiers	Whig
March 1835	Albert Denison	Whig	Stephen Rumbold Lushington	Conservative
1837	Albert Denison	Whig	James Bradshaw	Conservative
1841 by-election	George Smythe	Conservative	James Bradshaw	Conservative
1847 by-election	George Smythe	Conservative	Albert Denison	Whig
1850 by-election	George Smythe	Conservative	Frederick Romilly	Radical
1852	Henry Plumptre Gipps	Conservative	Henry Butler-Johnstone	Conservative
1853	Constituency representation suspended			
1854 by-election	Charles Manners Lushington	Peelite	Sir William Somerville, Bt	Whig
1857	Henry Butler-Johnstone	Conservative	Sir William Somerville, Bt	Whig
1859	Henry Butler-Johnstone	Conservative	Sir William Somerville, Bt	Liberal
1862 by-election	Henry Munro-Butler-Johnstone	Conservative	Sir William Somerville, Bt	Liberal
1865	Henry Munro-Butler-Johnstone	Conservative	John Walter Huddleston	Conservative
1868	Henry Munro-Butler-Johnstone	Independent Conservative	Theodore Brinckman	Liberal
1874	Henry Munro-Butler-Johnstone	Conservative	Lewis Majendie	Conservative
1878 by-election	Hon. Alfred Gathorne-Hardy	Conservative	Lewis Majendie	Conservative
1879 by-election	Hon. Alfred Gathorne-Hardy	Conservative	Robert Peter Laurie	Conservative
1880	Constituency representation suspended			

Back to Members of Parliament

=== MPs 1885–1918 ===
- Constituency representation restored and reduced to one (1885)

Election	Member	Party	Notes
1885	John Henniker Heaton	Conservative	
December 1910	Francis Bennett-Goldney	Independent Unionist	Died July 1918
1918 by-election	George Knox Anderson	Conservative	
1918	Parliamentary borough abolished, name transferred to a new county division		

Back to Members of Parliament

=== Canterbury county constituency ===
==== MPs 1918–present ====
Election	Member	Party	Notes
1918	Ronald McNeill	Conservative	Member for St Augustine's (1911–1918); Raised to the peerage as Baron Cushendun
1927 by-election	Sir William Wayland	Conservative	
1945	John White	Conservative	
1953 by-election	Leslie Thomas	Conservative	
1966	David Crouch	Conservative	
1987	Julian Brazier	Conservative	
2017	Rosie Duffield	Labour	
2024	Rosie Duffield	Independent	

Back to Members of Parliament

== Elections ==
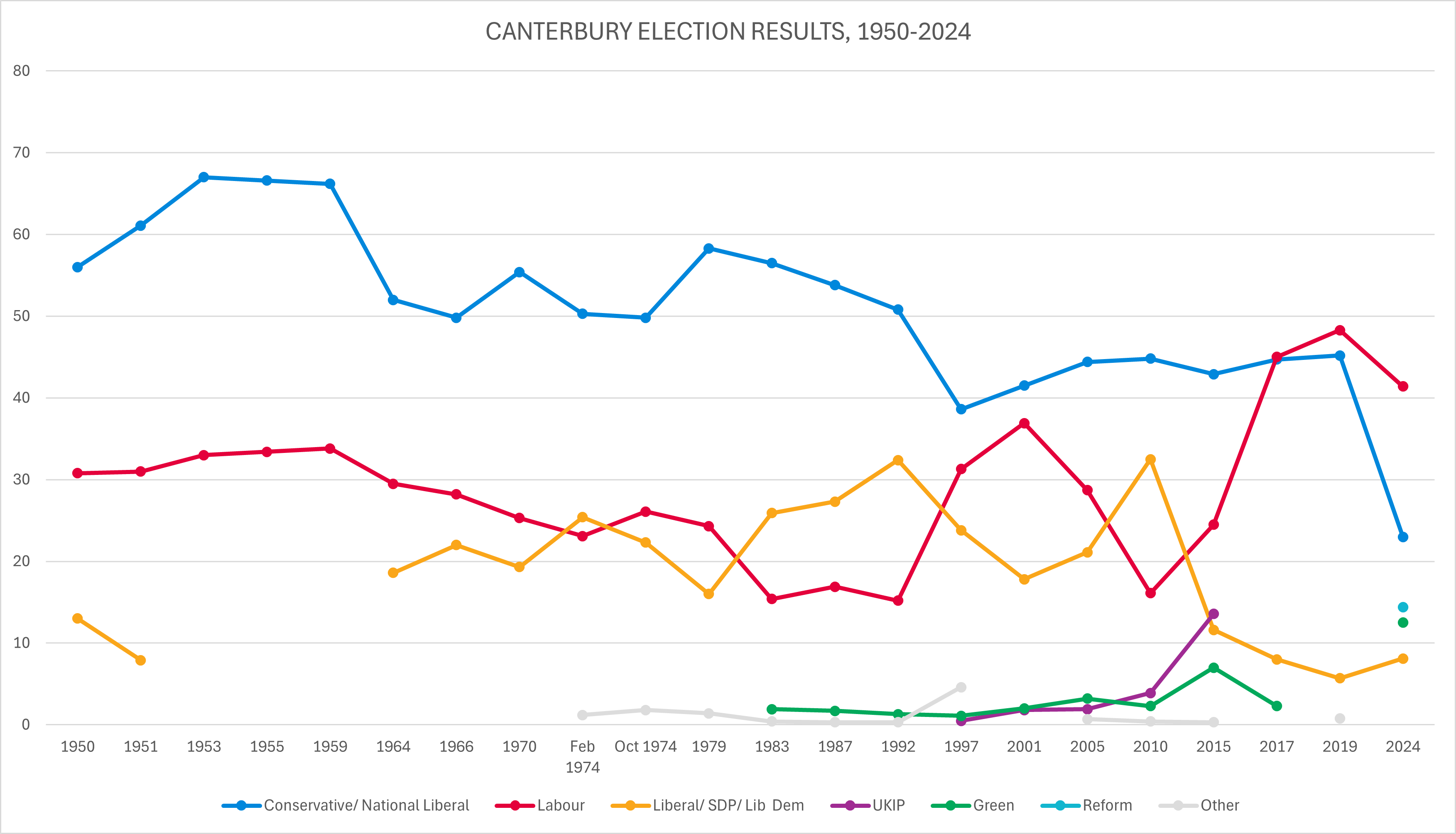
Canterbury election results, 1950-2024

=== Elections in the 2020s ===
General election 2024: Canterbury
Party	Candidate	Votes	%	±%
Labour	Rosie Duffield	19,531	41.4	−7.2
Conservative	Louise Harvey-Quirke	10,878	23.0	−21.8
Reform	Bridget Porter	6,805	14.4	N/A
Green	Henry Stanton	5,920	12.5	N/A
Liberal Democrats	Russ Timpson	3,812	8.1	+2.4
SDP	Luke Buchanan-Hodgman	285	0.6	N/A
Majority		8,653	18.4	+9.1
Turnout		47,231	66.4	−9.3
Registered electors		71,171		
Labour hold		Swing	+7.3	

=== Elections in the 2010s ===
2019 notional result
Party	Vote	%
Labour	27,782	48.6
Conservative	25,622	44.8
Liberal Democrats	3,257	5.7
Others	505	0.9
Turnout	57,166	75.7
Electorate	75,499	

General election 2019: Canterbury
Party	Candidate	Votes	%	±%
Labour	Rosie Duffield	29,018	48.3	+3.3
Conservative	Anna Firth	27,182	45.2	+0.5
Liberal Democrats	Claire Malcomson	3,408	5.7	−2.3
Independent	Michael Gould	505	0.8	N/A
Majority		1,836	3.1	+2.8
Turnout		60,113	75.0	+2.3
Labour hold		Swing	+1.4	

General election 2017: Canterbury
Party	Candidate	Votes	%	±%
Labour	Rosie Duffield	25,572	45.0	+20.5
Conservative	Julian Brazier	25,385	44.7	+1.8
Liberal Democrats	James Flanagan	4,561	8.0	−3.6
Green	Henry Stanton	1,282	2.3	−4.7
Majority		187	0.3	N/A
Turnout		56,800	72.7	+8.7
Labour gain from Conservative		Swing	+9.3	

General election 2015: Canterbury
Party	Candidate	Votes	%	±%
Conservative	Julian Brazier	22,918	42.9	−1.9
Labour	Hugh Lanning	13,120	24.5	+8.4
UKIP	Jim Gascoyne	7,289	13.6	+9.7
Liberal Democrats	James Flanagan	6,227	11.6	−20.9
Green	Stuart Jeffery	3,746	7.0	+4.7
Socialist (GB)	Robert Cox	165	0.3	N/A
Majority		9,798	18.4	+6.1
Turnout		53,465	64.0	−0.1
Conservative hold		Swing	−5.2	

General election 2010: Canterbury
Party	Candidate	Votes	%	±%
Conservative	Julian Brazier	22,050	44.8	+0.3
Liberal Democrats	Guy Voizey	16,002	32.5	+11.1
Labour	Jean Samuel	7,940	16.1	−12.0
UKIP	Howard Farmer	1,907	3.9	+1.9
Green	Geoff Meaden	1,137	2.3	−1.0
Money Reform	Anne Belsey	173	0.4	N/A
Majority		6,048	12.3	−3.5
Turnout		49,209	64.1	−2.3
Conservative hold		Swing	−5.4	

Back to Elections

=== Elections in the 2000s ===
General election 2005: Canterbury
Party	Candidate	Votes	%	±%
Conservative	Julian Brazier	21,113	44.4	+2.9
Labour	Alex Hilton	13,642	28.7	−8.2
Liberal Democrats	Jenny Barnard-Langston	10,059	21.1	+3.3
Green	Geoffrey Meaden	1,521	3.2	+1.2
UKIP	John Moore	926	1.9	+0.1
Legalise Cannabis	Rocky van de Benderskum	326	0.7	N/A
Majority		7,471	15.7	+11.1
Turnout		47,587	66.1	+5.2
Conservative hold		Swing	+5.5	

General election 2001: Canterbury
Party	Candidate	Votes	%	±%
Conservative	Julian Brazier	18,711	41.5	+2.9
Labour	Emily Thornberry	16,642	36.9	+5.6
Liberal Democrats	Peter Wales	8,056	17.8	−6.0
Green	Hazel Dawe	920	2.0	+0.9
UKIP	Lisa Moore	803	1.8	+1.3
Majority		2,069	4.6	−2.7
Turnout		45,132	60.9	−11.5
Conservative hold		Swing	−1.4	

Back to Elections

=== Elections in the 1990s ===
General election 1997: Canterbury
Party	Candidate	Votes	%	±%
Conservative	Julian Brazier	20,913	38.6	−11.8
Labour	Cheryl Hall	16,949	31.3	+15.9
Liberal Democrats	Martin Vye	12,854	23.8	−8.8
Referendum	James Osborne	2,460	4.5	N/A
Green	Geoffrey Meaden	588	1.1	N/A
UKIP	John Moore	281	0.5	N/A
Natural Law	Andrew Pringle	64	0.1	N/A
Majority		3,964	7.3	−11.1
Turnout		54,109	72.4	−5.7
Conservative hold		Swing	−13.9	

General election 1992: Canterbury
Party	Candidate	Votes	%	±%
Conservative	Julian Brazier	29,827	50.8	−3.0
Liberal Democrats	Martin J. Vye	19,022	32.4	+5.1
Labour Co-op	Fred Whitemore	8,936	15.2	−1.7
Green	Ms. Wendy J. Arnall	747	1.3	−0.4
Natural Law	Ms. Sally E. Curphey	203	0.3	N/A
Majority		10,805	18.4	−8.1
Turnout		58,735	78.1	+4.1
Conservative hold		Swing	−4.0	

Back to Elections

=== Elections in the 1980s ===
General election 1987: Canterbury
Party	Candidate	Votes	%	±%
Conservative	Julian Brazier	30,273	53.8	−2.7
Liberal	John Purchese	15,382	27.3	+1.4
Labour	Linda A. Keen	9,494	16.9	+1.5
Green	Steve Dawe	947	1.68	−0.2
Independent Canterbury Nationalist	Joan White	157	0.3	N/A
Majority		14,891	26.5	−4.1
Turnout		56,255	74.0	+4.0
Conservative hold		Swing	−2.1	

General election 1983: Canterbury
Party	Candidate	Votes	%	±%
Conservative	David Crouch	29,029	56.5	−1.8
Liberal	John Purchese	13,287	25.9	+9.9
Labour	Jeannette Gould	7,906	15.4	−8.9
Ecology	David Conder	962	1.9	N/A
Independent Nationalist	Joan White	226	0.4	N/A
Majority		15,742	30.6	−3.4
Turnout		51,410	70.0	−4.7
Conservative hold		Swing	−5.8	

Back to Elections

=== Elections in the 1970s ===
General election 1979: Canterbury
Party	Candidate	Votes	%	±%
Conservative	David Crouch	38,805	58.28	+8.47
Labour	RP Spencer	16,168	24.28	−1.82
Liberal	John Purchese	10,665	16.02	−6.31
National Front	Joan White	941	1.41	−0.35
Majority		22,637	34.00	+11.29
Turnout		66,578	74.72	+2.11
Conservative hold		Swing	+5.15	

General election October 1974: Canterbury
Party	Candidate	Votes	%	±%
Conservative	David Crouch	31,002	49.81	−0.53
Labour	MF Fuller	16,247	26.10	+3.01
Liberal	SE Goulden	13,898	22.33	−3.13
National Front	Kenneth McKilliam	1,096	1.76	+0.54
Majority		14,755	23.71	−1.27
Turnout		62,239	72.61	−7.63
Conservative hold		Swing	−1.77	

General election February 1974: Canterbury
Party	Candidate	Votes	%	±%
Conservative	David Crouch	34,341	50.34	−5.08
Liberal	S Goulden	17,300	25.36	+6.09
Labour	MF Fuller	15,751	23.09	−2.22
National Front	Kenneth McKilliam	831	1.22	N/A
Majority		17,041	24.98	−5.13
Turnout		68,220	80.24	+5.67
Conservative hold		Swing	−5.59	

General election 1970: Canterbury
Party	Candidate	Votes	%	±%
Conservative	David Crouch	33,222	55.42	+5.58
Labour	Henry Gordon N Clother	15,172	25.31	−2.90
Liberal	David C P Gracie	11,553	19.27	−2.68
Majority		18,050	30.11	+8.48
Turnout		59,950	74.57	−1.53
Conservative hold		Swing	+4.24	

Back to Elections

=== Elections in the 1960s ===
General election 1966: Canterbury
Party	Candidate	Votes	%	±%
Conservative	David Crouch	27,160	49.84	−2.13
Labour	B Sawbridge	15,372	28.21	−1.26
Liberal	Edwin W Moss	11,962	21.95	+3.39
Majority		11,788	21.63	−0.87
Turnout		54,494	76.10	−0.22
Conservative hold		Swing	−1.70	

General election 1964: Canterbury
Party	Candidate	Votes	%	±%
Conservative	Leslie Thomas	26,827	51.97	−14.23
Labour	George Selous Cobbett	15,211	29.47	−4.33
Liberal	Edwin W Moss	9,582	18.56	N/A
Majority		11,616	22.50	−9.90
Turnout		51,620	76.32	+1.18
Conservative hold		Swing	−9.28	

Back to Elections

=== Elections in the 1950s ===
General election 1959: Canterbury
Party	Candidate	Votes	%	±%
Conservative	Leslie Thomas	30,846	66.20	−0.35
Labour	George E Peters	15,746	33.80	+0.35
Majority		15,100	32.40	−0.70
Turnout		46,592	75.14	+2.48
Conservative hold		Swing	−0.35	

General election 1955: Canterbury
Party	Candidate	Votes	%	±%
Conservative	Leslie Thomas	28,739	66.55	+5.46
Labour	Reginald George Ward	14,444	33.45	+2.42
Majority		14,295	33.10	+3.04
Turnout		43,183	72.66	−7.40
Conservative hold		Swing	+3.94	

1953 Canterbury by-election
Party	Candidate	Votes	%	±%
Conservative	Leslie Thomas	19,400	66.99	+5.90
Labour	John A E Jones	9,560	33.01	+1.98
Majority		9,840	33.98	+3.92
Turnout		28,960		
Conservative hold		Swing	+3.94	

General election 1951: Canterbury
Party	Candidate	Votes	%	±%
Conservative	John Baker White	28,632	61.09	+5.14
Labour	John A E Jones	14,543	31.03	+0.27
Liberal	Thomas H Payne	3,695	7.88	−5.42
Majority		14,089	30.06	+4.87
Turnout		46,870	80.06	−2.42
Conservative hold		Swing	+2.71	

General election 1950: Canterbury
Party	Candidate	Votes	%	±%
Conservative	John Baker White	26,491	55.95	−6.66
Labour	Jackson Newman	14,563	30.76	−5.05
Liberal	Kenneth Graham Jupp	6,296	13.30	N/A
Majority		11,928	25.19	−3.61
Turnout		47,350	82.48	+13.70
Conservative hold		Swing	−5.86	

Back to Elections

=== Elections in the 1940s ===
General election 1945: Canterbury
Party	Candidate	Votes	%	±%
Conservative	John Baker White	24,282	61.61	−11.73
Labour	Joseph Denis Milburn Bell	14,115	35.81	+10.15
Common Wealth	Catherine Williamson	1,017	2.58	N/A
Majority		10,167	25.80	−22.88
Turnout		39,414	68.78	+4.33
Conservative hold		Swing		

Back to Elections

=== Elections in the 1930s ===
General election 1935: Canterbury
Party	Candidate	Votes	%	±%
Conservative	William Wayland	26,552	74.34	−9.33
Labour	Richard Adams	9,164	25.66	+9.33
Majority		17,388	48.68	−18.66
Turnout		35,716	64.45	−1.77
Conservative hold		Swing	−9.33	

General election 1931: Canterbury
Party	Candidate	Votes	%	±%
Conservative	William Wayland	30,328	83.67	+27.0
Labour	Paul Winterton	5,921	16.33	+2.4
Majority		24,407	67.34	+40.0
Turnout		36,249	66.22	−2.1
Conservative hold		Swing		

Back to Elections

=== Elections in the 1920s ===
General election 1929: Canterbury
Party	Candidate	Votes	%	±%
Unionist	William Wayland	19,181	56.7	−13.6
Liberal	David Carnegie	9,937	29.4	−0.3
Labour	Philip Sidney Eastman	4,706	13.9	N/A
Majority		9,244	27.3	−13.3
Turnout		33,825	68.3	+2.4
Registered electors		49,499		
Unionist hold		Swing	−6.7	

1927 Canterbury by-election
Party	Candidate	Votes	%	±%
Unionist	William Wayland	13,657	57.3	−13.0
Liberal	David Carnegie	10,175	42.7	+13.0
Majority		3,482	14.6	−26.0
Turnout		23,832	60.8	−5.1
Registered electors		39,229		
Unionist hold		Swing	−13.0	

General election 1924: Canterbury
Party	Candidate	Votes	%	±%
Unionist	Ronald McNeill	16,693	70.3	+11.9
Liberal	David Carnegie	7,061	29.7	−11.9
Majority		9,632	40.6	+23.8
Turnout		23,754	65.9	+9.4
Registered electors		36,045		
Unionist hold		Swing	+11.9	

General election 1923: Canterbury
Party	Candidate	Votes	%	±%
Unionist	Ronald McNeill	12,017	58.4	−12.8
Liberal	William Robertson Heatley	8,561	41.6	N/A
Majority		3,456	16.8	−25.6
Turnout		20,578	59.3	+2.5
Registered electors		34,715		
Unionist hold		Swing	N/A	

General election 1922: Canterbury
Party	Candidate	Votes	%	±%
Unionist	Ronald McNeill	13,954	71.2	−9.6
Labour	J.H.L. Sims	5,639	28.8	+9.6
Majority		8,315	42.4	−19.2
Turnout		19,593	56.8	+11.9
Registered electors		34,488		
Unionist hold		Swing	−9.6	

Back to Elections

=== Elections in the 1910s ===
General Election 1918: Canterbury
Party		Candidate	Votes	%
C	Unionist	Ronald McNeill	11,408	80.8
	Labour	Edward Timothy Palmer	2,719	19.2
Majority			8,689	61.6
Turnout			14,127	44.9
Registered electors			31,453	
	Unionist win (new boundaries)			
C indicates candidate endorsed by the coalition government.

== Election results 1885–1918 ==
=== Elections in the 1910s ===
1918 Canterbury by-election
Party	Candidate	Votes	%	±%
Unionist	George Knox Anderson	Unopposed		
Registered electors				
Unionist gain from Ind. Unionist				

General Election 1914/15:

Another General Election was required to take place before the end of 1915. The political parties had been making preparations for an election to take place and by July 1914, the following candidates had been selected;

- Unionist: Francis Bennett-Goldney
- Liberal: D. Roland Thomas

Back to Elections

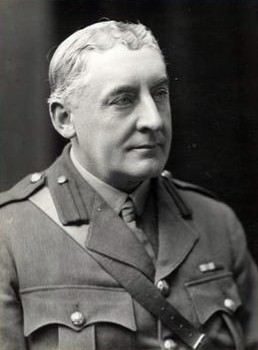
Bennett-Goldney

General election December 1910: Canterbury
Party	Candidate	Votes	%	±%
Ind. Conservative	Francis Bennett-Goldney	1,635	47.8	+9.6
Conservative	John Howard	1,163	34.0	−4.8
Liberal	William James Fisher	623	18.2	−4.8
Majority		472	13.8	N/A
Turnout		3,421	89.2	−3.0
Registered electors		3,836		
Ind. Conservative gain from Conservative		Swing	+7.2	

Woodcock

General election January 1910: Canterbury
Party	Candidate	Votes	%	±%
Conservative	John Henniker Heaton	1,371	38.8	−24.9
Ind. Conservative	Francis Bennett-Goldney	1,350	38.2	N/A
Liberal	H. B. D. Woodcock	815	23.0	−13.3
Majority		21	0.6	−26.8
Turnout		3,536	92.2	+2.4
Registered electors		3,836		
Conservative hold		Swing	−5.8	

=== Elections in the 1900s ===
General election 1906: Canterbury
Party	Candidate	Votes	%	±%
Conservative	John Henniker Heaton	2,210	63.7	N/A
Liberal	William James Fisher	1,262	36.3	N/A
Majority		948	27.4	N/A
Turnout		3,472	89.8	N/A
Registered electors		3,868		
Conservative hold		Swing	N/A	

General election 1900: Canterbury
Party	Candidate	Votes	%	±%
Conservative	John Henniker Heaton	Unopposed		
Conservative hold				

Back to Elections

=== Elections in the 1890s ===
General election 1895: Canterbury
Party	Candidate	Votes	%	±%
Conservative	John Henniker Heaton	Unopposed		
Conservative hold				

General election 1892: Canterbury
Party	Candidate	Votes	%	±%
Conservative	John Henniker Heaton	Unopposed		
Conservative hold				

Back to Elections

=== Elections in the 1880s ===
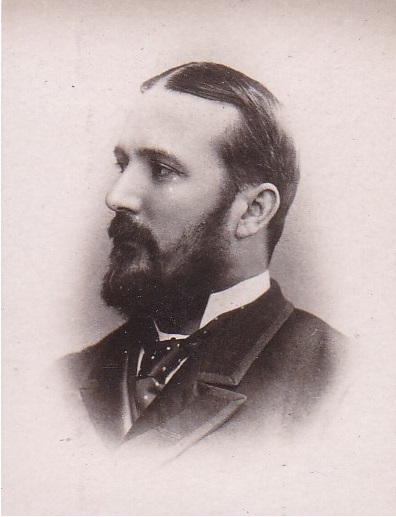
Heaton

General election 1886: Canterbury
Party	Candidate	Votes	%	±%
Conservative	John Henniker Heaton	Unopposed		
Conservative hold				

General election 1885: Canterbury
Party	Candidate	Votes	%	±%
Conservative	John Henniker Heaton	1,804	68.6	+15.1
Liberal	William Aubrey	825	31.4	−15.0
Majority		979	37.2	+34.7
Turnout		2,629	84.6	+11.0 (est)
Registered electors		3,107		
Conservative hold		Swing	+15.1	

== Election results 1832–1885 ==
=== Elections in the 1880s ===
General election 1880: Canterbury (2 seats)
Party	Candidate	Votes	%	±%
Conservative	Alfred Gathorne-Hardy	1,467	27.1	−4.6
Conservative	Robert Peter Laurie	1,425	26.4	−3.5
Liberal	Charles Edwards	1,294	23.9	+4.0
Liberal	Henry Butler-Johnstone	1,218	22.5	+3.9
Majority		131	2.5	−7.5
Turnout		2,702 (est)	73.6 (est)	−2.1
Registered electors		3,671		
Conservative hold		Swing	−4.3	
Conservative hold		Swing	−3.7	

After findings of corruption, the writ for Canterbury was suspended and the election result voided. The constituency was reconstituted in 1885. Back to Elections

=== Elections in the 1870s ===
By-election, 8 May 1879: Canterbury
Party	Candidate	Votes	%	±%
Conservative	Robert Peter Laurie	1,159	51.2	−10.4
Liberal	Charles Edwards	1,103	48.8	+10.3
Majority		56	2.4	−7.6
Turnout		2,262	73.2	−2.5
Registered electors		3,089		
Conservative hold		Swing	−10.4	

Majendie resigned, causing a by-election.

By-election, 2 Mar 1878: Canterbury
Party	Candidate	Votes	%	±%
Conservative	Alfred Gathorne-Hardy	Unopposed		
Conservative hold				

Butler-Johnstone resigned, causing a by-election.

General election 1874: Canterbury (2 seats)
Party	Candidate	Votes	%	±%
Conservative	Henry Butler-Johnstone	1,488	31.7	−0.2
Conservative	Lewis Majendie	1,406	29.9	+4.5
Liberal	Theodore Brinckman	934	19.9	+6.3
Liberal	Robert John Biron	873	18.6	+5.0
Majority		472	10.0	N/A
Turnout		2,351 (est)	75.7 (est)	−20.8
Registered electors		3,103		
Conservative gain from Ind. Conservative		Swing	N/A	
Conservative gain from Liberal		Swing	−0.9	

Back to Elections

=== Elections in the 1860s ===
General election 1868: Canterbury (2 seats)
Party	Candidate	Votes	%	±%
Ind. Conservative	Henry Butler-Johnstone	1,453	31.9	+4.1
Liberal	Theodore Brinckman	1,236	27.1	+3.8
Conservative	John Walter Huddleston	1,157	25.4	−1.3
Conservative	Henry James Lee Warner	709	15.6	−22.2
Turnout		2,896 (est)	96.5 (est)	+10.4
Registered electors		3,001		
Majority		744	16.3	N/A
Ind. Conservative gain from Conservative		Swing	N/A	
Majority		79	1.7	N/A
Liberal gain from Conservative		Swing	+2.6	

General election 1865: Canterbury (2 seats)
Party	Candidate	Votes	%	±%
Conservative	Henry Butler-Johnstone	767	27.8	N/A
Conservative	John Walter Huddleston	737	26.7	N/A
Liberal	William Lyon	643	23.3	N/A
Liberal	Robert Adair	614	22.2	N/A
Majority		94	3.4	N/A
Turnout		1,381 (est)	86.1 (est)	N/A
Registered electors		1,603		
Conservative hold		Swing	N/A	
Conservative gain from Liberal		Swing	N/A	

By-election, 6 Mar 1862: Canterbury (1 seat)
Party	Candidate	Votes	%	±%
Conservative	Henry Butler-Johnstone	694	50.1	N/A
Liberal	William Lyon	691	49.9	N/A
Majority		3	0.2	N/A
Turnout		1,385	74.9	N/A
Registered electors		1,850		
Conservative hold		Swing	N/A	

Johnstone resigned, causing a by-election.

Back to Elections

=== Elections in the 1850s ===
General election 1859: Canterbury (2 seats)
Party	Candidate	Votes	%	±%
Conservative	Henry Butler-Johnstone	Unopposed		
Liberal	William Somerville	Unopposed		
Registered electors		1,831		
Conservative hold				
Liberal hold				

General election 1857: Canterbury (2 seats)
Party	Candidate	Votes	%	±%
Conservative	Henry Butler-Johnstone	815	39.7	−28.5
Whig	William Somerville	759	37.0	+26.2
Whig	Charles Purton Cooper	477	23.3	+12.5
Majority		56	2.7	−4.5
Turnout		1,026 (est)	54.7 (est)	−15.6
Registered electors		1,876		
Conservative hold		Swing	−23.9	
Whig gain from Conservative		Swing	+20.2	

By-election, 18 August 1854: Canterbury (2 seats)
Party	Candidate	Votes	%	±%
Peelite	Charles Manners Lushington	727	28.6	−0.5
Whig	William Somerville	699	27.5	+5.9
Conservative	Charles Lennox Butler	671	26.4	−2.4
Whig	Charles Purton Cooper	406	16.0	N/A
Radical	Edward Glover	41	1.6	−18.6
Turnout		1,272 (est)	64.5 (est)	−5.8
Registered electors		1,973		
Majority		56	2.2	N/A
Peelite gain from Conservative		Swing	−3.2	
Majority		28	1.1	N/A
Whig gain from Conservative		Swing	+3.7	

General election 1852: Canterbury (2 seats)
Party	Candidate	Votes	%	±%
Conservative	Henry Plumptre Gipps	766	29.1	N/A
Conservative	Henry Butler-Johnstone	758	28.8	N/A
Whig	William Somerville	570	21.6	−6.5
Radical	Frederick Romilly	533	20.2	N/A
Conservative	George Smythe	7	0.3	−26.9
Majority		188	7.2	N/A
Turnout		1,317 (est)	70.3 (est)	−1.2
Registered electors		1,874		
Conservative hold		Swing	N/A	
Conservative gain from Whig		Swing	N/A	

- Smythe retired before polling. The election was declared void on petition, due to bribery, and the writ suspended on 21 February 1853. A by-election was called to replace both MPs in August 1854.

By-election, 4 March 1850: Canterbury
Party	Candidate	Votes	%	±%
Radical	Frederick Romilly	Unopposed		
Radical gain from Whig				

Denison was elevated to the peerage, becoming 1st Baron Londesborough, and causing a by-election.

Back to Elections

=== Elections in the 1840s ===
General election 1847: Canterbury (2 seats)
Party	Candidate	Votes	%	±%
Whig	Albert Denison	808	28.1	−3.6
Conservative	George Smythe	782	27.2	−9.0
Conservative	John Vance	643	22.4	N/A
Conservative	Thomas Charles Pelham-Clinton	641	22.3	N/A
Majority		165	5.7	N/A
Turnout		1,437 (est)	71.5 (est)	−4.2
Registered electors		2,010		
Whig gain from Conservative		Swing	+0.5	
Conservative hold		Swing	−0.5	

By-election, 15 March 1847: Canterbury (1 seat)
Party	Candidate	Votes	%	±%
Whig	Albert Denison	Unopposed		
Whig gain from Conservative				

- Caused by Bradshaw's death

General election 1841: Canterbury (2 seats)
Party	Candidate	Votes	%	±%
Conservative	George Smythe	823	36.2	+10.5
Conservative	James Bradshaw	729	32.1	+6.8
Whig	Thomas Twisden Hodges	720	31.7	−17.3
Majority		103	4.5	N/A
Turnout		1,451	75.7	−6.4
Registered electors		1,918		
Conservative hold		Swing	+9.6	
Conservative gain from Whig		Swing	+7.7	

By-election, 3 February 1841: Canterbury
Party	Candidate	Votes	%	±%
Conservative	George Smythe	772	54.5	+3.5
Whig	John Wright Henniker Wilson	628	44.3	−4.7
Whig	Thomas Twisden Hodges	17	1.2	N/A
Majority		144	10.2	N/A
Turnout		1,417	73.9	−8.2
Registered electors		1,918		
Conservative gain from Whig		Swing	+4.1	

- Caused by Denison's resignation

=== Elections in the 1830s ===
General election 1837: Canterbury (2 seats)
Party	Candidate	Votes	%	±%
Conservative	James Bradshaw	761	25.7	+9.9
Whig	Albert Conyngham	755	25.5	−10.9
Conservative	Henry Plumptre Gipps	751	25.3	+9.5
Whig	Frederick Villiers	698	23.5	−8.3
Turnout		1,507	82.1	−7.0
Registered electors		1,835		
Majority		63	2.2	N/A
Conservative gain from Whig		Swing	+9.8	
Majority		4	0.2	+0.1
Whig hold		Swing	−10.3	

General election 1835: Canterbury (2 seats)
Party	Candidate	Votes	%	±%
Whig	Albert Conyngham	755	36.4	−5.1
Whig	Frederick Villiers	660	31.8	−8.1
Conservative	Stephen Rumbold Lushington	658	31.7	N/A
Majority		2	0.1	−21.1
Turnout		1,307	89.1	+9.5
Registered electors		1,467		
Whig hold		Swing	N/A	
Whig hold		Swing	N/A	

- On petition, Villiers was declared unduly elected and Lushington declared elected.

General election 1832: Canterbury (2 seats)
Party	Candidate	Votes	%	±%
Whig	Richard Watson	834	41.5	N/A
Whig	George Cowper	802	39.9	N/A
No label	William Percy Honeywood Courtenay	375	18.6	N/A
Majority		427	21.2	N/A
Turnout		1,203	79.6	N/A
Registered electors		1,467		
Whig hold		Swing	N/A	
Whig hold		Swing	N/A	

== Elections before 1832 ==
=== Elections in the 1830s ===
General election 1831: Canterbury (2 seats)
Party	Candidate	Votes	%	±%
Whig	Richard Watson	Unopposed		
Whig	George Cowper	Unopposed		
Whig hold				
Whig hold				

General election 1830: Canterbury (2 seats)
Party	Candidate	Votes	%	±%
Whig	Richard Watson	1,334	41.9	
Whig	George Cowper	1,101	34.6	
Tory	Henry Bingham Baring	731	23.0	
No label	Samuel Elias Sawbridge	8	0.3	
No label	George Milles	8	0.3	
Majority		370	11.6	N/A
Turnout		1,988		
Registered electors				
Whig hold		Swing		
Whig gain from Tory		Swing		

Back to Elections

== See also ==
- parliamentary constituencies in Kent
- List of parliamentary constituencies in the South East England (region)

== Sources ==
- Iain Dale, ed. (2003). The Times House of Commons 1929, 1931, 1935. Politico's (reprint). ISBN 1-84275-033-X.
- The Times House of Commons 1945. 1945.
- The Times House of Commons 1950. 1950.
- The Times House of Commons 1955. 1955.
