= Leslie Thomas (politician) =

Sir Leslie Montagu Thomas (24 April 1906 – 27 November 1971) was a British Conservative politician. He was elected Member of Parliament for Canterbury in a 1953 by-election, and served until he stood down in 1966. He had unsuccessfully contested Leek in 1935 as a National Labour candidate.

Thomas was the son of former Labour (turned National Labour) MP, Jimmy Thomas.

Parliament of the United Kingdom
| Preceded by John Baker White | Member of Parliament for Canterbury; 1953 – 1966 | Succeeded by David Crouch |
