= Thomas Norman =

Member of the Parliament of England

Thomas Norman (born before 1400 – 1434 or after), of Canterbury, Kent, was an English politician and brewer.

Norman was not originally from Canterbury, but lived there from 1400 or after. Nothing is recorded of his origin, family or education.

He was a Member of the Parliament of England (MP) for Canterbury in 1421.
