= Walter Hendley (MP) =

16th-century English politician

Walter Hendley (by 1499 – 1 March 1550), of Cranbrook, Kent and Gray's Inn, London, was an English politician.

== Career ==
Hendley was a member of parliament for Canterbury, Kent in 1542.
