= 1847 Canterbury by-election =

UK parliamentary by-election

The 1847 Canterbury by-election was an uncontested election, which was held on 15 March 1847. It was brought about as a result of the death of the incumbent Conservative MP, James Bradshaw and was won by the Liberal candidate Lord Albert Conyngham (the only declared candidate).

== See also ==
- List of United Kingdom by-elections (1832–1847)
