= John Wimpole =

English politician

John Wimpole or Wynpol, of Canterbury, Kent, was an English politician.

== Family ==
Wimpole married, before January 1378, a woman named Sarah.

== Career ==
Wimpole was a Member of Parliament for the Canterbury constituency in September 1388.
