= Robert Darknall =

16th-century English politician

Robert Darknall or Dartnoll (by 1501 – 1553/1556), of Canterbury, Kent and London, was an English politician.

== Family ==
Darknall was the son of Robert Darknall of Penshurst and his wife Joan (Fagger). He was educated at the Middle Temple. In 1522, he was married to a widow named Alice Symon, the daughter and coheiress of the Canterbury MP, Henry Goseborne. They had at least two sons and one daughter.

== Career ==
Darknall was a member of parliament for Canterbury in 1529, 1536, 1542, 1547, and March 1553, and for Rochester in October 1553.
