= John Nutt (politician) =

English politician

John Nutt (1605 – 10 October 1668) was an English politician who sat in the House of Commons from 1640 to 1653. He fought on the Parliamentary side in the English Civil War.

Nutt was an alderman of Canterbury and lived at Nackington House at Nackington.

In April 1640, Nutt was elected Member of Parliament for Canterbury in the Short Parliament. He was re-elected in MP for Canterbury for the Long Parliament in November 1640. He was commissioned as a captain in the parliamentary army and was a member of the parliamentary committee for Kent.

Nutt died at the age of 63 and was buried at Nackington.

Nutt married firstly Anne Master, daughter of Sir Edward Master and had nine children before she died in 1641. He married secondly Ann Aldrich, daughter of John Aldrich of Norfolk.

Parliament of England
Vacant Parliament suspended since 1629	Member of Parliament for Canterbury; 1640–1653; With: Sir Edward Master	Not represented in Barebones Parliament
