= John Symme =

Member of the Parliament of England

John Symme, of Canterbury, Kent (c. 1333 – after 1393), was an English politician and weaver.

Symme was a Member of Parliament for Canterbury constituency in April 1384 and 1386. Symme married, before 1381, a woman named Christine. He was bailiff of the city of Canterbury in 1392.
