= William Lane (died c. 1438) =

Member of the Parliament of England

William Lane (died c. 1438), of Canterbury, Kent, was an English politician and vintner.

== Family ==
Lane was the brother of Thomas Lane, MP. William married, before September 1393, a woman named Joan.

== Career ==
Lane was a Member of Parliament for Canterbury in February 1413 and May 1421.
