= Richard Railton =

16th-century English politician

Richard Railton (by 1522 – will proved 1575), of Canterbury, Kent, was an English politician.

== Career ==
He was a member of parliament (MP) for Canterbury.
