= John Henniker Heaton =

British politician

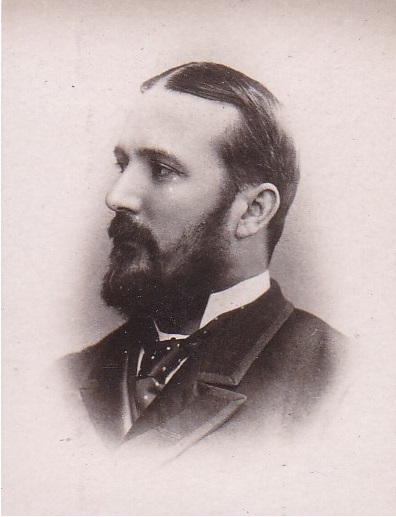
Sir John Henniker Heaton

Sir John Henniker Heaton, 1st Baronet, KCMG, CB (18 May 1848 – 8 September 1914) was a United Kingdom Conservative Party Member of Parliament and a postal reformer and journalist in Australia.

== British Member of Parliament ==
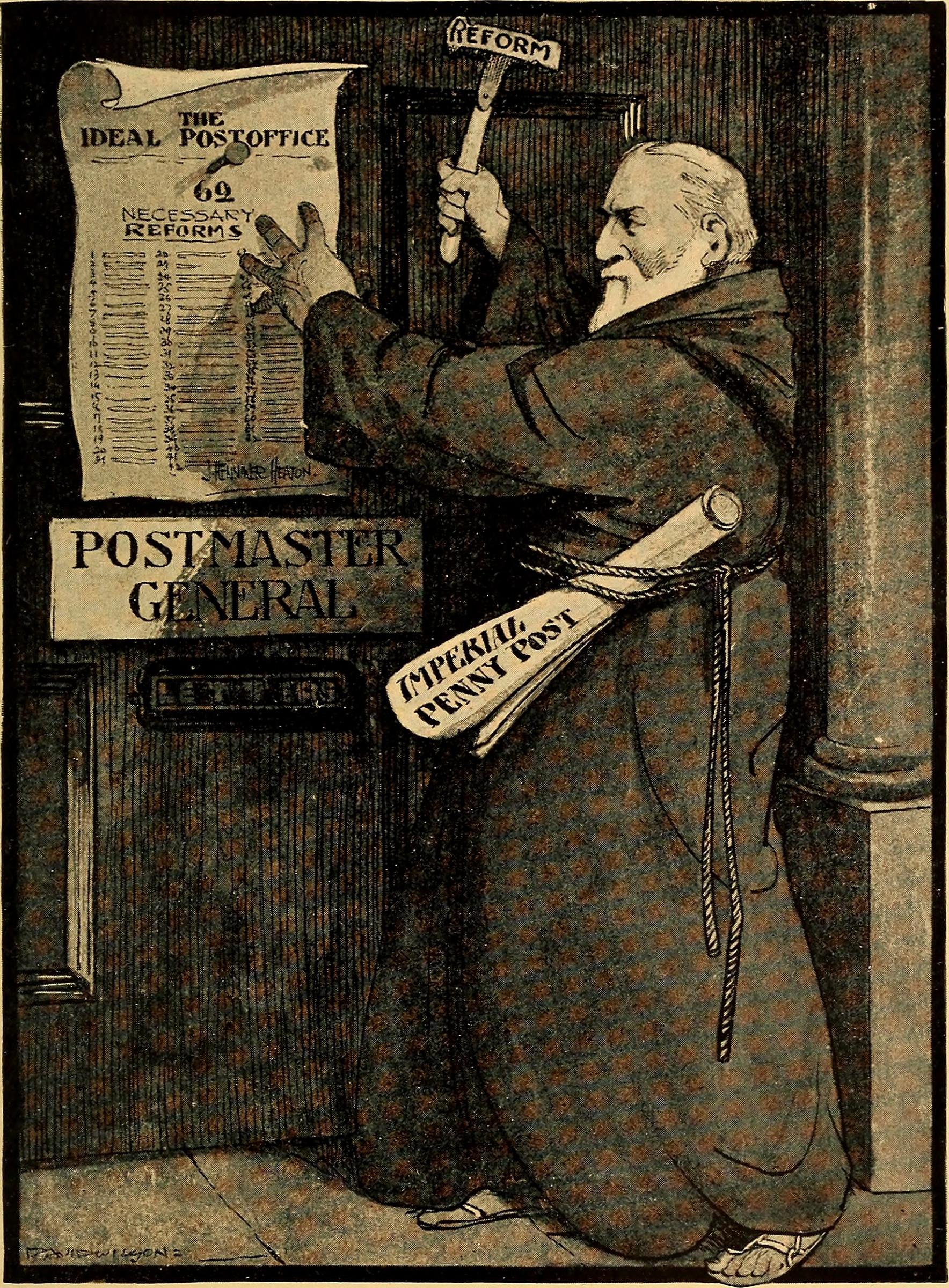
John Henniker Heaton as depicted in The life and letters of Sir John Henniker Heaton bt. by Rose Henniker Porter (1916)

Following the end of the Second Boer War in June 1902, he visited South Africa in September and October that year. Heaton was a fellow of the Royal Colonial Institute and the Royal Society of Literature, and lectured to the latter on Australian Aboriginals. Chess was his favourite recreation. He also collected books and had a large collection of Australiana that at one stage included the original manuscript Endeavour journal of Sir Joseph Banks.

== Works ==
- "Imperial Postal Services" . The Empire and the century. London: John Murray. 1905. pp. 288–317.

Parliament of the United Kingdom
Vacant Representation suspended Title last held by Alfred Gathorne-Hardy; Robert Peter Laurie	Member of Parliament for Canterbury; 1885 – Dec. 1910	Succeeded by Francis Bennett-Goldney
Baronetage of the United Kingdom
New creation	Baronet (of Mundarrah Towers); 1912–1914	Succeeded by John Henniker-Heaton
