= Thomas Scott (died 1635) =

English Member of Parliament

Thomas Scott (c.1566/7-1635), of St. Alphege, Canterbury and Egerton, Godmersham, Kent, was an English Member of Parliament (MP).

He was a Member of the Parliament of England for Canterbury in 1624 and 1628.
