= Nicholas Fish (MP) =

16th-century English politician

Nicholas Fish (by 1518 – 1558 or later), of Canterbury and Fordwich, Kent, was an English politician.

== Career ==
In November 1554, he was a member of parliament for Canterbury.
