= Thomas Lane (14th-century MP) =

English politician (??–c.1423)

Thomas Lane (died 1423?), of Canterbury, Kent, was an English politician.

== Family ==
Lane was the brother of William Lane, also an MP for Canterbury. Lane married, before September 1387, a woman named Katherine, the widow of John Taunton jnr. of Canterbury, who died in 1385.

== Career ==
Lane was a Member of Parliament for Canterbury, Kent in 1399, 1410, May 1413 and November 1414.
