= William Lovelace (MP, died 1577) =

16th-century English politician

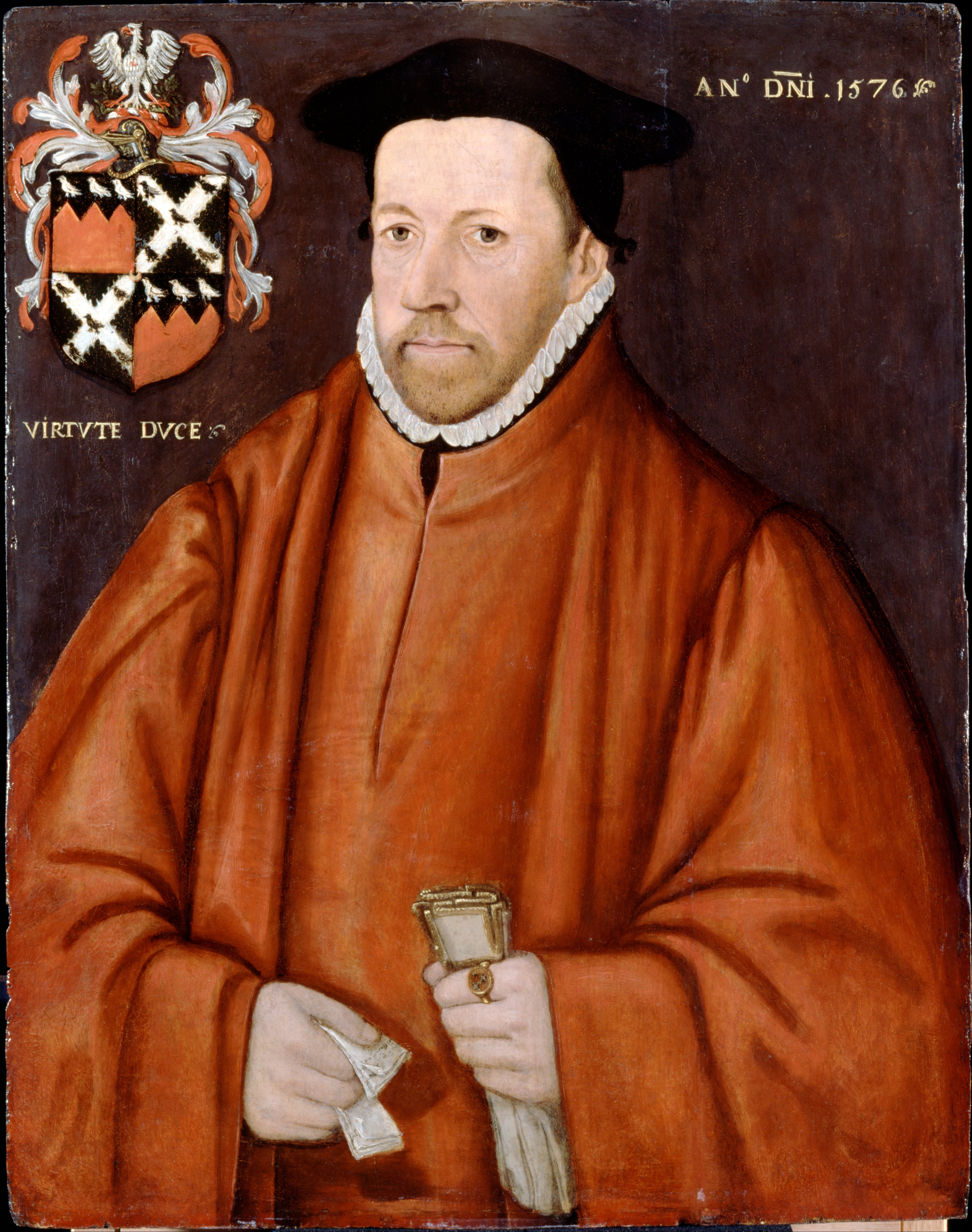
Portrait of William Lovelace, 1576

William Lovelace (c.1525–1577), of Bethersden, near Ashford and Canterbury, Kent, was an English politician and lawyer.

He was the son of William Lovelace and Alice Stevens Shaw (1495–1542), and studied law in Gray's Inn (1548), being called to the bar in 1551.

He was a Member of Parliament (MP) for Canterbury in 1563, 1571 and 1572. He became serjeant-at-law in 1557.

He died in 1577 and was buried in Canterbury Cathedral. He had married twice; firstly Anne Lewis (1536–1569), daughter of Robert Lewis (Alderman of Canterbury) with whom he had 2 sons and a daughter and secondly Mary, the daughter of Sir Thomas White, MP of South Warnborough, Hampshire and the widow of Thomas Caryll. His eldest son Sir William Lovelace (1561–1629) was MP for Canterbury in the Addled Parliament of 1614.
