= John Rogers II =

English politician

John Rogers II (died 1611/1612), of Canterbury, Kent, was an English politician. He is tentatively identified as a son of Richard Rogers.

== Career ==
He was a Member of Parliament (MP) for Canterbury in 1601.
