= John Boys (died 1612) =

English politician and lawyer

Sir John Boys (c. 1535 – 1612), of St. Gregory's, Canterbury, the Middle Temple, London and Betteshanger, Kent, was an English politician, noted lawyer, and steward to the Archbishop of Canterbury.

== Background ==
He was a younger son of William Boys (d.c.1549), of Fredville, Nonington, Kent by Mary, sister and heir of Sir Edward Ringley of Knowlton, Kent. His family had held the manor of Fredville since the reign of Henry VII. He entered the Middle Temple in February 1560 and became a Bencher of the society in 1580.

== Career ==
He was appointed recorder of Sandwich in 1572 and chosen to represent the town in parliament. In the same year he began to represent the Archbishop of Canterbury as steward of the liberties. He sat for Midhurst in 1593, probably through the influence of Richard Lewknor (died 1616), a fellow Middle Temple lawyer and legal advisor to Viscount Montagu. As the city's recorder from 1592, he sat in parliament for Canterbury in 1597, 1601 and 1604. As an MP he was active on a number of committees, concentrating on legal and maritime matters.

In 1595 Boys founded Jesus hospital, Canterbury, an almshouse for 8 men and 4 women in Northgate Street, Canterbury. He was among the knights created by James VI and I in March 1604 at the Tower of London before his Royal entry into London.

== Family ==
He married:

1. Dorothy, daughter of Thomas Pawley of London
2. Jane (d.1635), daughter and coheir of Thomas Walker of London

He died in August 1612 without a direct heir and was buried in Canterbury cathedral.
