= Julian Brazier =

British politician (born 1953)

Sir Julian Brazier TD
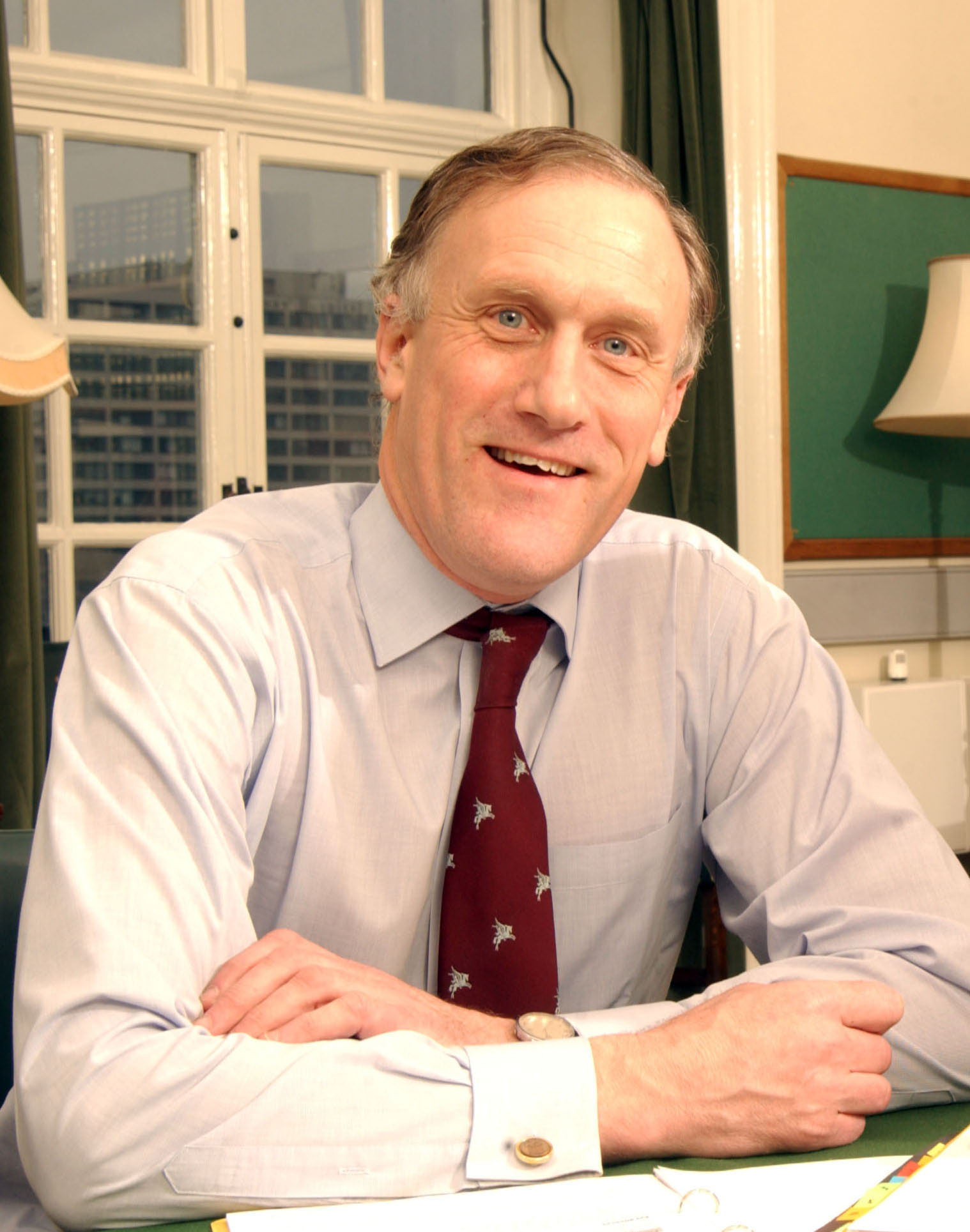
- Brazier in 2005

Parliamentary Under Secretary of State for Reserves
- In office 14 July 2014 – 16 July 2016
- Prime Minister: David Cameron

Member of Parliament for Canterbury
- In office 11 June 1987 – 3 May 2017
- Preceded by: David Crouch
- Succeeded by: Rosie Duffield

Personal details
- Born: 24 July 1953 (age 73) Dartford, Kent, England
- Party: Reform UK (2026–present)
- Other political affiliations: Conservative (1976–2026)
- Spouse: Katharine Elizabeth Blagden
- Children: 3
- Education: Brasenose College, Oxford
- Website: parliament..julian-brazier

Military service
- Allegiance: United Kingdom
- Branch/service: British Army
- Years of service: 1972–1985
- Rank: Captain
- Unit: Special Air Service; Parachute Regiment
- Awards: Efficiency Decoration

Sir Julian William Hendy Brazier TD (born 24 July 1953) is a British politician. He was the Conservative Party Member of Parliament (MP) for Canterbury from 1987 to 2017. He joined Reform UK in 2026.

== Early life and career ==
Born into a military family, his father being a lieutenant colonel, Brazier was educated at two independent schools: the Dragon School in Oxford and Wellington College in the village of Crowthorne in Berkshire. He then went to Brasenose College, Oxford, graduating with a BA in mathematics and philosophy, later promoted to an Oxford MA. He was the President of the Oxford University Conservative Association in 1973.

Brazier joined the Territorial Army aged 19 in 1972 and served for 13 years, five of which were with 21 SAS(R). He was awarded the Efficiency Decoration in 1993. He was employed by Charter Consolidated Ltd between 1975 and 1984, being involved in economic research from 1975 to 1977 and corporate finance from 1977 to 1981, and was secretary to the executive committee of the board from 1981 to 1984, when he became a management consultant with HB Maynard International, now owned by Accenture.

Brazier contested the 1983 general election in Berwick-upon-Tweed, but was defeated by the Liberal MP Alan Beith by 8,215 votes. He contested the Conservative safe seat of Canterbury at the 1987 general election following the retirement of the sitting MP, David Crouch. He held the seat with a majority of 14,891.

== Parliamentary career ==
Brazier became the Parliamentary Private Secretary (PPS) to Gillian Shephard, the Minister of State at the Treasury. He remained Shephard's PPS following the 1992 general election in her new capacity as the Secretary of State for Employment, but he resigned in 1993 as a protest against defence cuts. He was awarded the 'Backbencher of the Year' at the annual Spectator magazine awards in 1996. Following the 1997 general election, he became a member of the Defence Select committee.

Beginning in 1998, Brazier led a campaign opposing the closure of Kent and Canterbury Hospital and in support of its Cancer Centre. This included multiple adjournment debates in the Commons, questions to the minister, and taking part in public demonstrations. The initial plans for shutdown were overturned in 2005, but he continued to campaign in 2017.

Following the 2001 general election that Brazier was given a job by Iain Duncan Smith, then Leader of the Opposition, initially as an Opposition Whip in 2001, then as a spokesman on Work and Pensions in 2002.

He was briefly Home Affairs spokesman in 2003, before being moved later in the year by Michael Howard, who had succeeded Duncan Smith, to be a spokesman on International Affairs. Brazier remained on the frontbench after the 2005 general election as a spokesman on Transport (Shipping & Aviation).

Brazier focused on armed forces issues during his time in the House of Commons. He was also a member of the Public Bill Committee for the Defence Reform Act 2014. In 2010, Brazier was appointed by Prime Minister David Cameron as a member of a three person commission to plan the future of Britain's reserve armed forces. This reported in July 2011, providing a blueprint which was subsequent largely adopted by the government in its 2013 white paper. He served as a member of the House of Commons Defence Select Committee from 1997-2001, and then again from 2010 to 2014, at which point he was appointed Minister for Reserves at the Ministry of Defence.

Brazier was a member of the Cornerstone Group of Conservative MPs, a group considered to be on the right of the Conservative Party. As a practising Roman Catholic, he is a social conservative. Brazier supported a bill put forth by Laurence Robertson in June 2005 that would have put heavy restraints on abortion.

Brazier worked on policies relating to children's issues, including the treatment of child abuse victims in courts. He served on the special standing committee of Tony Blair's first bill attempting to reform adoption (which was lost in the 2001 general election) and later participated in the legislative stages of the Adoption and Children's Act 2002. In 2006 he was founding co-chairman of the All-party group for Adoption (later Adoption and Fostering), campaigning for the adoption of children in care, in Parliament and through the media. In 2008, he proposed a law that would allow parliament to ban seriously violent films and games, even if the BBFC had approved them.

As co-chairman of the All Party Group for Adventure and Recreation in Society, Brazier campaigned against the impact of so-called compensation culture and excessive health and safety legislation on adventure opportunities for young people. For this, he was shortlisted for the Grassroot Diplomat Initiative Award in 2015, and he remains in the directory of the Grassroot Diplomat Who's Who publication.

Brazier campaigns for a reduction in immigration; pointing to pressures on housing, infrastructure, education, and the wages of low-paid workers. During the run up to the 2016 EU membership referendum, Julian Brazier was in favour of leaving the EU.

Towards the end of the Lebanese Civil War, Brazier visited Beirut and Lebanese president Michel Aoun, while the city was besieged by Syrian occupation forces. In 1996 he returned, organising the British delegation to an Anglo-Lebanese conference on Freedom and Democracy held in defiance of the Syrian-backed regime but attended by the UK and US ambassadors. He later returned in 2006 as UK representative at an international protest against the treatment of Lebanese lawyer, Dr Muhamad Mugraby, who had exposed the arrest and illegal detentions during the Syrian-dominated era.

Brazier consistently voted against bills furthering LGBT rights, including equalling the age of consent, civil partnerships and scrapping the controversial Section 28 act, which banned teachers from "promoting homosexuality" or "teaching ... the acceptability of homosexuality as a pretended family relationship". He opposed the legalisation of same-sex marriage, saying that it would "undermine a treasured institution and could have unforeseen consequences". Brazier was also quoted as saying, "We shouldn't allow an institution of this importance to be re-defined simply to meet a rights agenda".

Brazier was knighted in the 2017 New Year Honours. At the general election 2017, he narrowly lost his seat to Rosie Duffield (at that time under Labour).

== Subsequent career ==
Following his defeat in the 2017 general election, Brazier has pursued a portfolio career as a director, advisor or board member to a series of companies, charities, and non-profit organisations. He was a governor of Ampleforth College from 2021 to 2025.

He was Honorary Colonel of the Land Information Assurance Group Army Reserve until August 2023, when his commission expired.

On 26 July 2026, Brazier announced that he had left the Conservative Party after 50 years and joined Reform UK, citing the party's position on immigration as his main reason for doing so.

== Personal life ==
Brazier married Katharine Elizabeth Blagden on 21 July 1984 in Hampshire. The couple have three sons (twins born July 1990, and another son born December 1992). His youngest son, John, was elected councillor for Westgate ward at the 2015 Canterbury City Council election, and resigned in 2017. He is the son-in-law of Brigadier Paddy Blagden, a United Nations de-mining expert.

In February 2002, Brazier was given a four-month suspended sentence after he crashed into and killed a motorcyclist in Italy on 29 August 2001. Brazier had been driving on the wrong side of the road approaching a sharp bend when he hit a motorcyclist, 42-year-old Carlo Civitelli, near Siena. He used his TA training to give Civitelli first aid at the scene, but the man died three days later. Italian police found that Mr Civitelli's helmet was not properly fitted and that he was probably speeding. After the verdict, Brazier said in a statement: "I am still deeply saddened by the tragic consequences of my lapse of attention. My thoughts are with the Civitelli family whose reaction to the whole terrible business has been so generous". He also said "as a parent, I shall carry the memory of this man's death with me for the rest of my life."

Parliament of the United Kingdom
Preceded by David Crouch	Member of Parliament for Canterbury; 1987–2017	Succeeded by Rosie Duffield
