= George Knox Anderson =

British politician (1854–1941)

George Knox Anderson JP (1854 – 19 March 1941) was briefly the Conservative Member of Parliament (MP) for Canterbury.

== Career ==
In April 1912, he was appointed a deputy lieutenant of Kent. He was also a Justice of the peace for North Aylesford. Professionally, he was the Director of the Associated Portland Cement Manufacturers, Ltd.

Anderson was elected unopposed in August 1918 to succeed Francis Bennett-Goldney, who was killed in a motoring accident while in France a month prior. Anderson was seen a temporary replacement until the following general election, as he was approved by the two feuding Conservative groups in Canterbury.

He retired at the dissolution three months later, becoming one of the shortest serving MPs on record. He never made a speech or asked a question, although he voted in 12 divisions.

For more than twenty years he was Honorary Treasurer of Canterbury Diocesan Board of Finance. He was also involved in the church in a variety of roles, including as a lay reader, Church Councillor and a Churchwarden.

== Death ==
Anderson died at Canterbury on 26 March 1941, aged 86. He left £144,858, and at the time of his death he was married with a son and a daughter.

== See also ==
- List of United Kingdom MPs with the shortest service

Parliament of the United Kingdom
Preceded by Francis Bennett-Goldney	Member of Parliament for Canterbury; 1918	Succeeded by Ronald McNeill
