= Robert Farthing =

English politician

Robert Farthing, of Canterbury, Kent, was an English politician.

== Family ==
Farthing was the son of Robert Farthing of Canterbury.

== Career ==
Farthing was a Member of Parliament for Canterbury, Kent in 1394 and September 1397.
