= John Sheldwich (died c. 1455) =

Member of the Parliament of England

John Sheldwich II (died c. 1455), of Canterbury, Kent, was an English politician and lawyer.

== Family ==
Sheldwich was the son of the earlier MP for Canterbury, John Sheldwich. Sheldwich married, before January 1420, a woman named Isabel. They had one son.

== Career ==
Sheldwich was a Member of Parliament for Canterbury, Kent in February 1413, April 1414, November 1414, 1415, March 1416, 1417, 1419, May 1421, 1423, 1427, 1429, 1431, 1433 and 1439.
