= Thomas Holt (MP for Canterbury) =

Member of the Parliament of England

Thomas Holt (died between 1408 and 1417) was an English politician and lawyer.

== Family ==
Holt married, before January 1408, a woman named Joan. Holt was from Canterbury, Kent.

== Career ==
Holt was a Member of Parliament for Canterbury constituency, in 1386. He was a landowner in the Westgate area of Canterbury, on the Isle of Thanet and in the area between Canterbury and Sandwich.
