= William Ickham =

English politician

William Ickham (died 1424), of Canterbury, Kent, was an English politician.

== Family ==
Ickham was the son of Thomas Ickham, also an MP for Canterbury. Ickham was married to Margaret, the widow of Hugh Holyngbroke. They had no children, leading to lengthy legal wranglings after his death.

== Career ==
Ickham was a Member of Parliament for Canterbury, Kent in 1411, October 1416 and 1420.
