= Robert Alcock (barrister) =

16th-century English politician

Robert Alcock (died 1583), of Canterbury and Marden, Kent, was an English barrister and recorder who twice sat briefly in parliament.

Alcock was educated at Gray's Inn, where he was admitted in 1546, and was called to the bar in 1548. He was a counsel to Canterbury by 1561, and was a Member of Parliament (MP) for Canterbury in 1563 and again in 1571. He was a common councilman from 1566 to 1582. Also in 1566 he was appointed as recorder of Sandwich, Kent, and as a commissioner of ecclesiastical causes for Kent. He was treasurer of Gray's Inn in 1576.

He married firstly Parnell Barlinge in 1562; and secondly a Fisher. He had at least two sons and one daughter.
