= Edmund Horne =

English politician

Edmund Horne of Canterbury, Kent, was an English politician.

== Family ==
Horne married, before 1381, a woman named Christine.

== Career ==
Horne was a Member of Parliament for Canterbury in 1371, October 1382, November 1384, 1391, September 1397 and 1406.
