= Robert Cooper (MP for Canterbury) =

Member of the Parliament of England

Robert Cooper (fl. 1402), of Canterbury, Kent, was an English politician and grocer.

== Family ==
Cooper was the son of John Cooper, a woodman, of Canterbury.

== Career ==
Cooper was a Member of Parliament for Canterbury in 1402.
