= Henry Lincoln (MP) =

English politician

Henry Lincoln (died 1397), of Canterbury, Kent, was an English politician.

== Family ==
Lincoln was the son of Robert Lincoln of Canterbury, also an MP. Henry married, before 1381, a woman named Isabel, and they had three sons.

== Career ==
Lincoln was a Member of Parliament for Canterbury constituency in October 1382, February 1383, 1385 and January 1390.
