= John Umfray =

Member of the Parliament of England

John Umfray (died 1409 or after), of Canterbury, Kent, was an English politician and draper.

== Career ==
Umfray was a member of parliament for Canterbury, Kent in October 1404.
