= John Haute =

Member of the Parliament of England

John Haute (died ca. 1410), of Canterbury, Kent, was an English politician and draper.

== Family ==
Haute was married twice; both women were named Alice.

== Career ==
Haute was a Member of Parliament for Canterbury, Kent in October 1404.
