= John Proude =

English politician (??–c.1409)

John Proude (died ca. 1409), of Sellindge and Canterbury, Kent, was an English politician.

== Family ==
Proude married three times. Before 1374, he married a woman named Margaret, and they had one son and one daughter. Before 1404, he married for a second time, to Joan. He later married a woman named Christine.

== Career ==
Proude was a Member of Parliament for the constituency of Canterbury, Kent in 1391 and 1394.
