= John Sheldwich (died after 1411) =

English politician (??—c.1411)

John Sheldwich I (died after 1411) was an English politician, a Member of Parliament for Canterbury, Kent, in 1399 and 1402. He was the son of John Sheldwich of Canterbury, also an MP. Before 1402, he married a woman named Agnes. They had a son, John, who was also MP for the city, and one daughter.
