= George Newman (MP) =

English politician

George Newman (ca. 1562 – 7 June 1627), of Canterbury, Kent, was an English politician.

He was a Member of Parliament (MP) for Dover in 1601 and Canterbury in 1614 and 1621.

In March 1602 Newman was appointed judge of the Admiralty court of the Ports by Henry Brooke, warden of the Cinque Ports.
