= Richard Gervays =

English politician

Richard Gervays (died c. 1410), of Canterbury, Kent, was an English politician.

== Family ==
Gervays was married to a woman named Margery, and they had one son.

== Career ==
Gervays was a Member of Parliament for Canterbury, Kent in 1393 and January 1397.
