= Thomas Ickham =

English politician

Thomas Ickham (died 1415), of Canterbury, Kent, was an English politician.

== Family ==
Ickham was married, before 1380, to a woman named Joan, a widow. They had one son, William Ickham, also an MP.

== Career ==
Ickham was a Member of Parliament for Canterbury constituency in May 1382, January 1390, 1395 and 1401.
