= William Lovelace (MP, died 1629) =

English member of parliament (1561–1629)

Sir William Lovelace (1561–1629), of Lovelace Place, Bethersden and Greyfriars, Canterbury, Kent, England, was the member of parliament (MP) for Canterbury, elected in 1614.
