= Smythe =

Smythe, related to the surname Smith, may refer to:

== People ==
- Conn Smythe (1895–1980), Canadian businessman, soldier and sportsman in ice hockey and horse racing
- Dallas Smythe (1907–1992), Canadian political activist and researcher
- Danny Smythe (1948–2016), American drummer, member of the rock band The Box Tops
- Douglas Smythe, American visual effects artist
- Durham Smythe (born 1995), American football player
- Fallon Smythe, actress in the TV series Gotham Knights
- Faye Smythe (born 1985), New Zealand actress
- Frank Smythe (1900–1949), British mountaineer, author, photographer, and botanist
- George Smythe, 7th Viscount Strangford (1818–1857), British politician
- J. Anthony Smythe (1885–1966), American actor
- James Moore Smythe (1702–1734), English playwright and fop
- John Smythe (disambiguation)
- Liz Smythe, New Zealand nursing and midwifery professor
- Pat Smythe (pianist) (1923–1983), Scottish jazz pianist
- Pat Smythe (1928–1996), British show jumper
- Percy Smythe, 6th Viscount Strangford (1780–1855), British diplomat
- Percy Smythe, 8th Viscount Strangford (1826–1869), British man of letters
- Peter Smythe (disambiguation)
- Philip Smythe, 2nd Viscount Strangford (1634–1708), English politician
- Quentin Smythe (1916–1997), South African World War II recipient of the Victoria Cross
- Reg Smythe (1917–1998), British cartoonist
- Stafford Smythe (1921–1971), Canadian ice hockey player and manager
- Thomas Smythe (c. 1558–1625), English merchant and politician
- Thomas Smythe, 1st Viscount Strangford (1599–1635)
- William Smythe (disambiguation)

== Fictional characters ==
- Alan Smythe, in the British TV series Monarch of the Glen
- Alistair Smythe, a Spider-Man villain
- Coran Heironymus Wimbledon Smythe, in the animated TV series Voltron: Legendary Defender
- Evelyn Smythe, a Doctor Who character
- Greenlee Smythe in the American soap opera All My Children
  - Mary Greenlee Smythe, her mother
- Ira Smythe, a mercenary in the video game Jagged Alliance 2
- Jane Smythe, an X-Men villain
- Reginald Ponsonby-Smythe, in the video game Destroy All Humans! 2
- Samantha Smythe, in the American comic book series That Wilkin Boy
- Samson Smythe, in That Wilkin Boy
- Sheila Smythe, in That Wilkin Boy
- Sebastian Smythe, in the American TV series Glee
- Smythe (Ninjago), in the animated TV series Ninjago
- Spencer Smythe, a Spider-Man villain
- Sylvester P. Smythe, mascot of American humor magazine Cracked
