= Richard Smythe =

English Member of Parliament

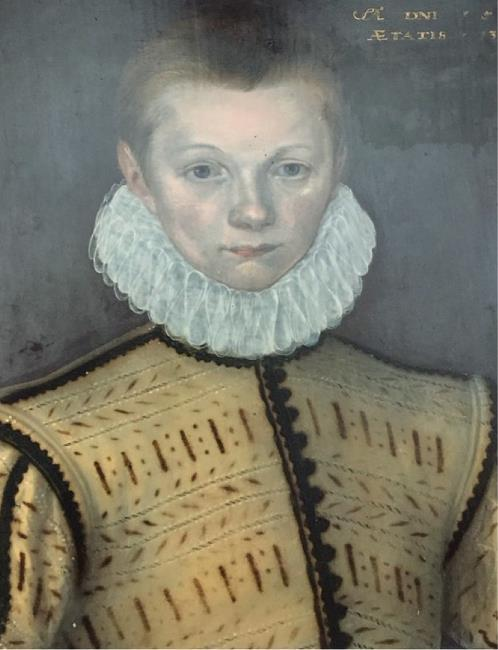
Sir Richard Smythe, 1579, Cornelis Ketel

Sir Richard Smythe (1563-1628), of Bromley, Kent and St. Stephen Coleman Street, London; later of Leeds Castle, Kent, was an English Member of Parliament (MP).

== Family background ==
Richard Smythe was a younger son of Thomas "Customer" Smythe of Westenhanger in Kent, and his wife Alice, a daughter of Sir Andrew Judde. His father was a haberdasher and "customer" of the port of London.

== Career ==
Educated at the Middle Temple, Smythe bought Leeds Castle in 1599 and carried out substantial rebuilding. He was a Member of the Parliament of England for Heytesbury in 1604, and for Hythe in 1614.

Smythe and his elder brother Sir Thomas Smythe were jointly receiver of rents for Duchy of Cornwall from August 1604. He operated a monopoly in the trade of tin from the summer of 1605, partnered by members of the London Pewterer's Company. The project was funded in part by the royal exchequer. Smythe was also a Surveyor of Revenue of Prince Charles.

== Family and children ==
Smythe married three times, firstly, in September 1589, to Elizabeth, a daughter of Sir Thomas Scott of Smeeth, and widow of John Knatchbull of Mersham Hatch, Kent. His second wife was Jane (died 1607), daughter of John White, haberdasher, and widow of Samuel Thornhill (died 1598) of Bromley. His third wife was Margaret (died 1638), daughter of John Langton, merchant of London, and widow of Robert Clarke (died 1610), merchant of Bethnal Green.

== Death and burial ==
Smythe died on 21 July 1628. He was buried at St Mary's Parish Church, Ashford, where an inscription outlines his career. After the death of his son, John Smythe in 1632, his daughters Elizabeth, Lady Thornhill, and Mary Barrow subsequently sold Leeds Castle to Sir Thomas Colepeper of Hollingbourne.

== Colepeper quilt ==
An embroidered Indian silk quilt from Bengal, an early surviving example of the use of such fabrics in England, was donated to Colonial Williamsburg by Cora Ginsburg. An ownership label of Catherine Colepeper seems to connect the quilt to Leeds Castle and the Smythe and Colepeper families. Richard Smythe's brother was a founder and governor of the English East India Company.
