= John Smith (High Sheriff of Kent) =

English politician

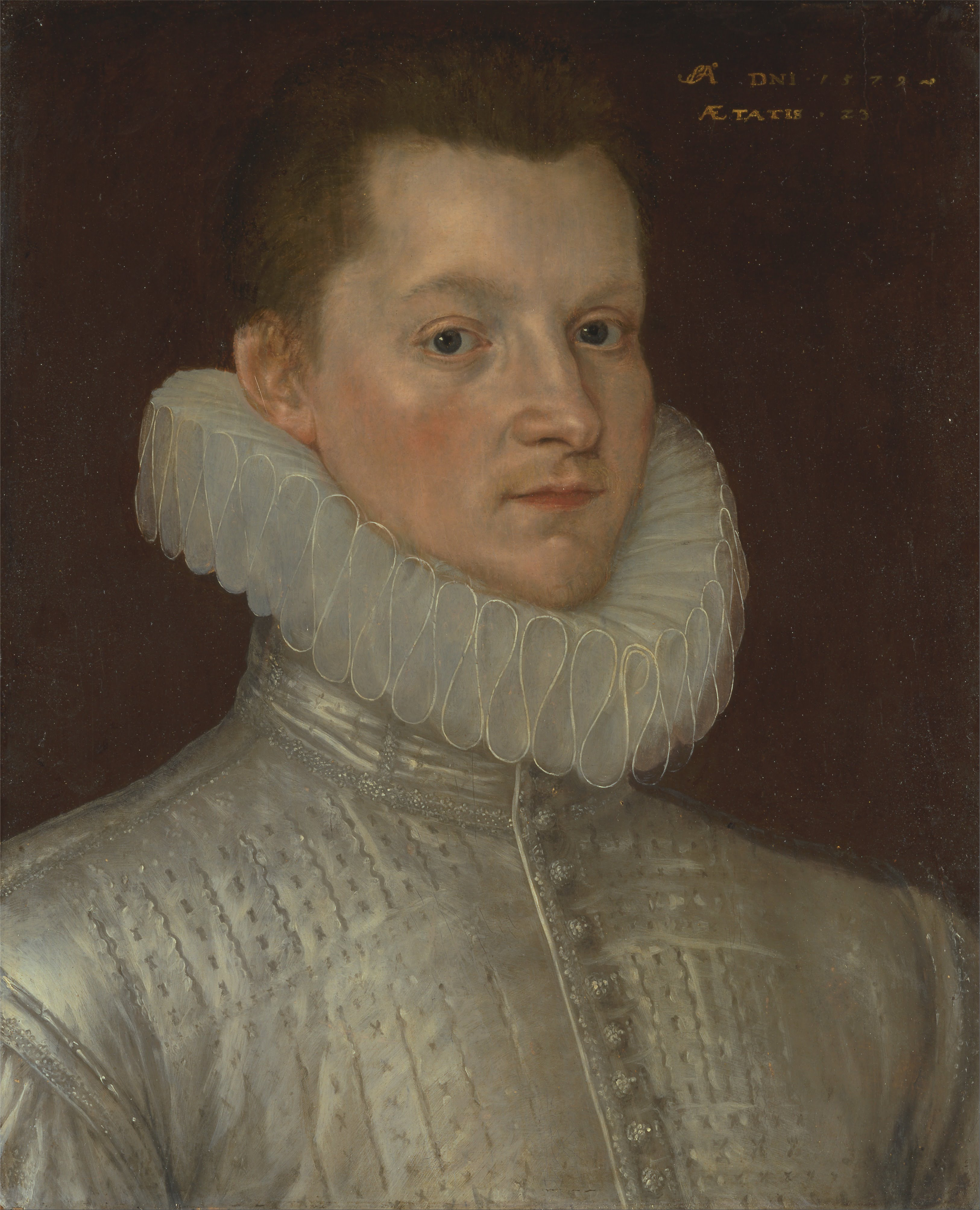

Justice of the Peace
- In office 1587–1608

High Sheriff of Kent
- In office 1600–1601

Member of the British Parliament for Aylesbury
- In office 1584

Member of the British Parliament for Hythe
- In office 1586, 1587, and 1604

Personal details
- Born: 1557
- Died: 29 October 1608 (aged 50–51)
- Spouse: Elizabeth Fyneux
- Children: 8
- Parent: Thomas Smythe (father)

Sir John Smith or Smythe, JP (Sep. 1557 – 29 October 1608), of Westenhanger, Kent, was an English politician.

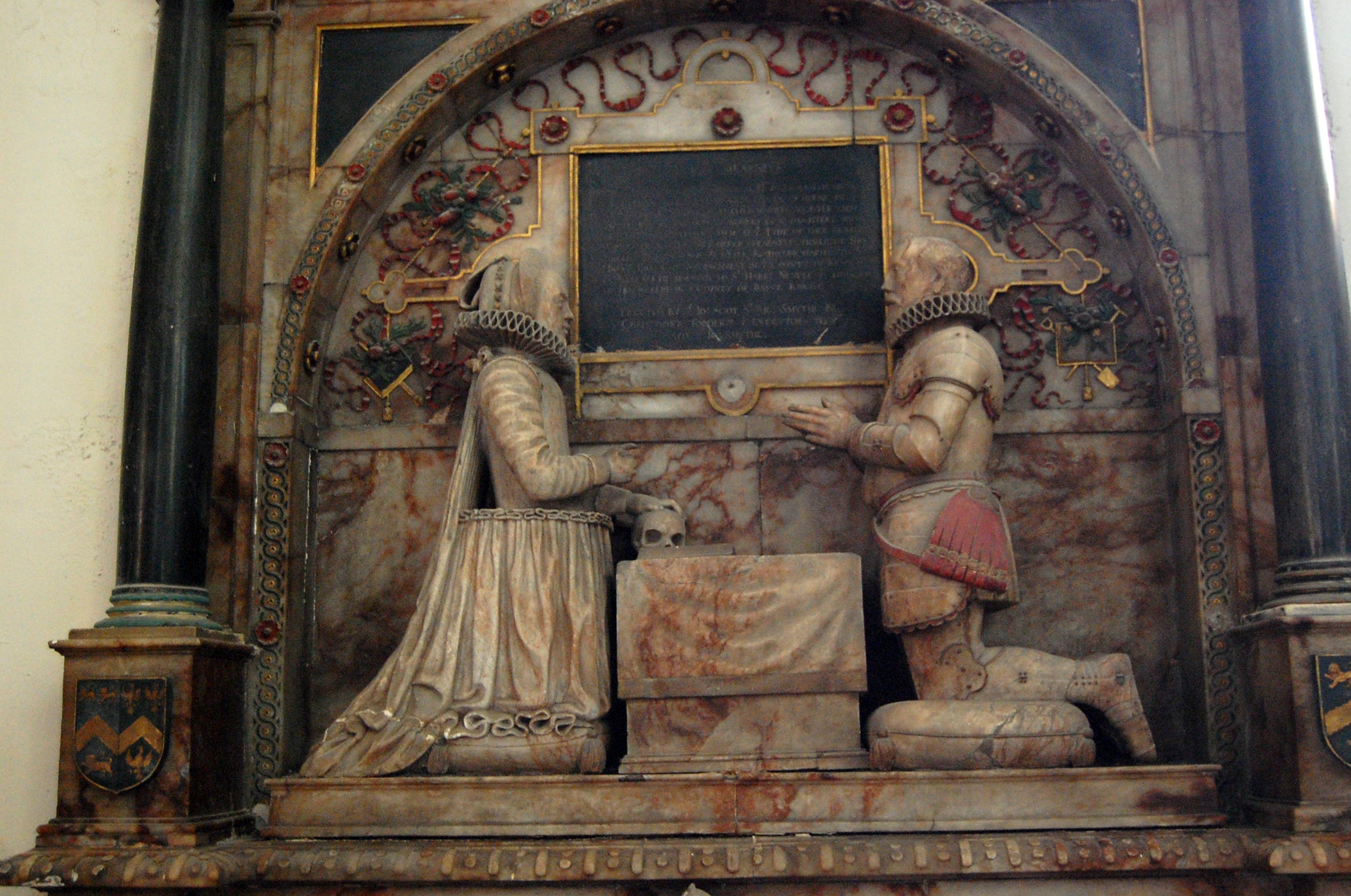
Sir John & Elizabeth Smythe memorial in St Mary the Virgin Church, Ashford, Kent

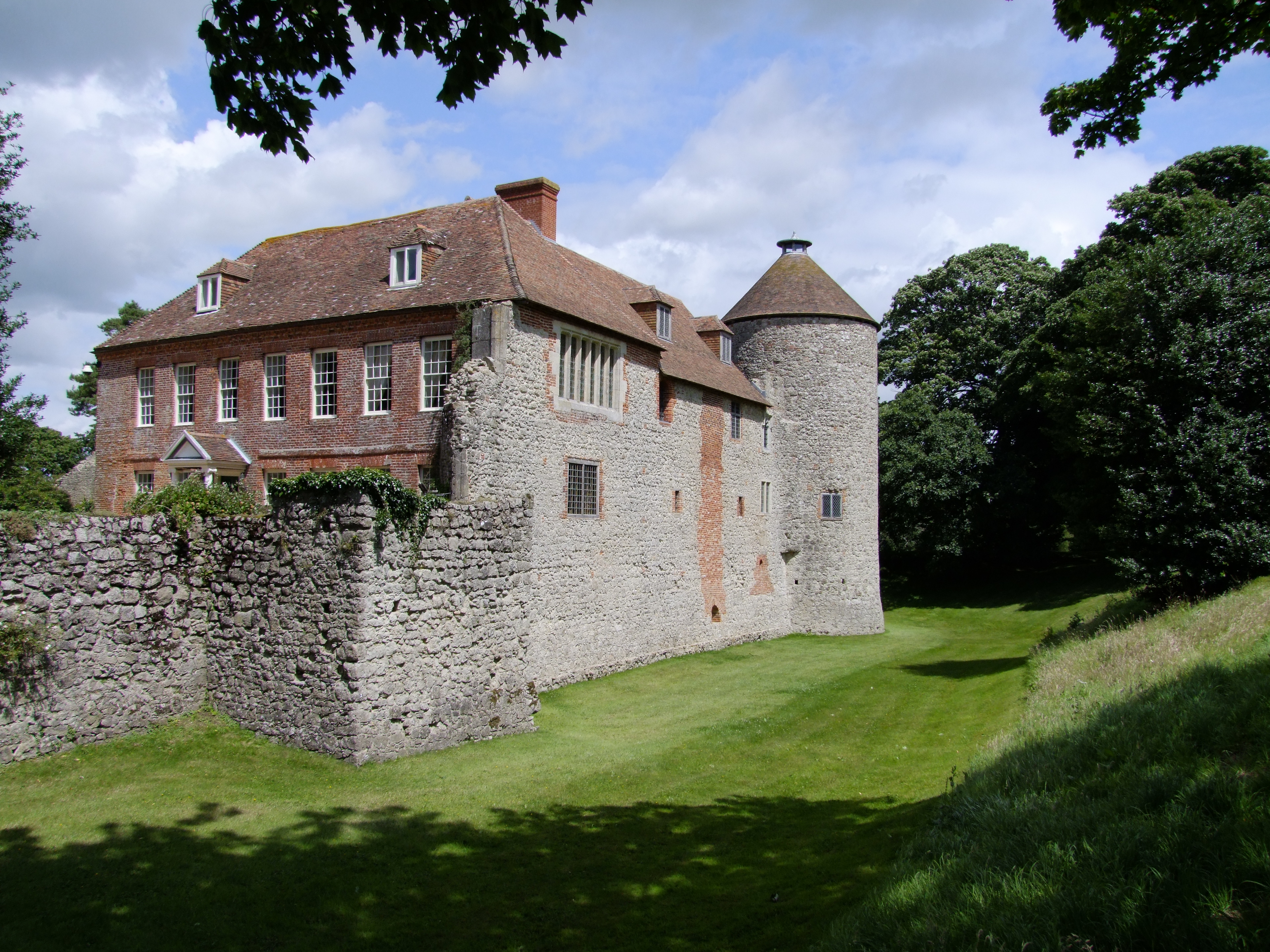
Westenhanger Castle, Kent

He was the eldest surviving son of Thomas Smythe, a London haberdasher who was a collector of customs duties ("customer") and who had bought Westenhanger Castle. His brother was Thomas Smythe, the first governor of the East India Company. John entered Gray's Inn to study law in 1577. He succeeded his father in 1591, inheriting Westenhanger Castle, and was knighted on 11 May 1603.

He was a justice of the peace for Kent from 1587 to his death and was appointed High Sheriff of Kent for 1600–01. He was elected a member of parliament (MP) for Aylesbury in 1584 and Hythe in 1586, 1587 and 1604. He was the Deputy Governor of the Mines Royal from 1605 to death.

He died in 1608 and was buried at Ashford. He had married Elizabeth, the daughter and heiress of John Fyneux of Herne, Kent, and had 2 sons (one of whom predeceased him) and 6 daughters. His surviving son Thomas was created an Irish peer in 1635, becoming Viscount Strangford.
