= Kensington Gardens Square =

Garden square in London

Coordinates: 51.51418°N 0.19013°W

Houses along Kensington Gardens Square

Kensington Gardens Square is a garden square in Bayswater, London. The square, named for the nearby Kensington Gardens, is characteristic of much of the mid 19th-century development of the Bayswater and Paddington areas.

== History and description ==
The square was developed by Henry de Bruno Austin shortly after his completion of the nearby Cleveland Square and Garden. Being of similar arrangements, both consist of a smaller northern garden intersected by a row of houses from the more substantial southern garden. Work on Kensington Gardens Square began by 1857, Building News describing the houses going up as being of a French Renaissance style.

At No. 21 the Victoria College for Daughters of Gentleman was established in 1859, moving later to No. 20. By the 1890s a number of boarding houses had been established in the square and the Booth survey of 1899 noted that others were being converted into flats. Most of the houses are stucco-fronted with projecting Doric porticoes and tripartite windows for the first and second floors. The houses which back directly onto the southern square also have bow windows overlooking the gardens. All the surviving original houses of the square are Grade II listed.

Other buildings on the square include the Nos. 72-74 on the eastern side replacing bomb damaged houses from the Second World War. The northeastern corner is a modern block of flats which was originally the mews and later an extension of the neighbouring Whiteleys department store. Other than flats, a number of the buildings have been converted to hotels but the gardens remain private.
