= Lady Strangford =

British illustrator, writer and nurse

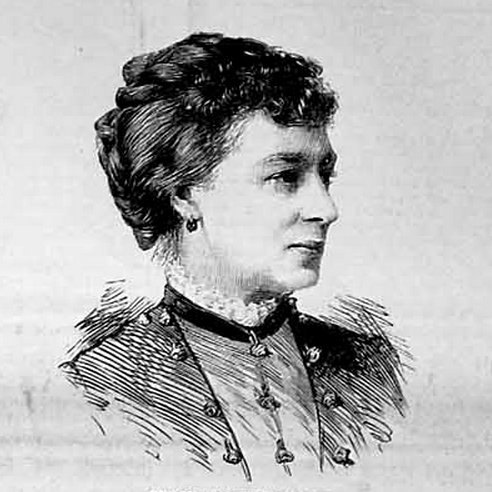
- from The Graphic
- Born: Emily Anne Beaufort; 1826; St Marylebone
- Died: 24 March 1887 (aged 60–61); SS Lusitania in the Mediterranean
- Other name: Emily Ann Smythe
- Known for: Travel writing and war nursing
- Spouse: Percy Smythe, 8th Viscount Strangford

Emily Ann Smythe, Viscountess Strangford or Emily Anne Beaufort RRC, (1826 – 24 March 1887) was a British illustrator, writer and nurse. There are streets named after her and permanent museum exhibits about her in Bulgaria. She established hospitals and mills to assist the Bulgarians following the April Uprising in 1876 that preceded the re-establishment of Bulgaria. She was awarded the Royal Red Cross medal by Queen Victoria for establishing another hospital in Cairo.

== Life ==
Emily Anne Beaufort was born in St Marylebone and baptised in April 1826. Her parents were Admiral Sir Francis Beaufort and his wife Alice. Her father gave his name to the Beaufort Scale.

In 1858 she set out on a journey with her elder sister to Egypt. The book that she wrote, Egyptian Sepulchres and Syrian Shrines was dedicated to her sister, and describes the places she visited in Syria, Lebanon, Asia Minor and Egypt with illustrations based on her sketches from her journey. The volume was so popular that it was re-issued several times.

Of the ancient oasis city, Palmyra she writes:

"I was once asked whether Palmyra was "not a broken-down old thing in a style of slovenly decadence?" It is true its style is neither pure nor severe: nothing over which the lavish hand of hasty and Imperial Rome has passed is ever so: but, Tadmor [Palmyra] is free from all the vulgarity of real decadence; it is so entirely irregular as to be sometimes fantastic; the designs are overflowing with richness and fancy, but it is never heavy: it is free, independent, bizarre, but never ungraceful; grand indeed, though hardly sublime, it is almost always bewitchingly beautiful." (pp. 239–40)

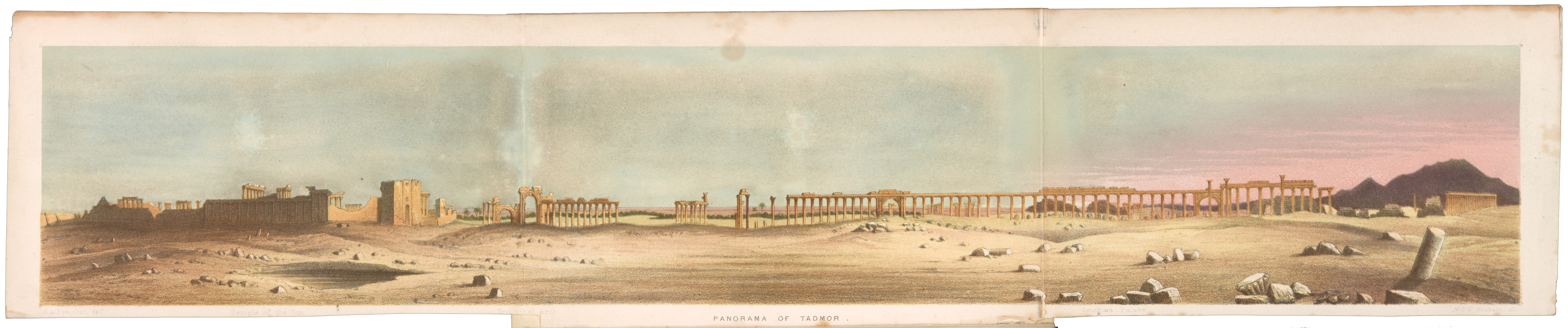
Color lithograph panorama of Palmyra, Syria by Nicholas Hanhart after Emily Anne Beaufort Smythe, 1862.

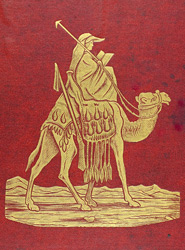
Egyptian Sepulchres and Syrian Shrines by Beaufort

Strangford received a critical review of her 1861 book Egyptian Sepulchres and Syrian Shrines by Percy Smythe, later Viscount Strangford. Unusually, this led to them meeting and their marriage.

In 1859 and 1860 she was travelling in Smyrna, Rhodes, Mersin, Tripoli, Beirut, Baalbek, Athens, Attica, the Pentelicus mountains, Constantinople and Belgrade. During the whole journey she kept a journal recording all that she experienced.

When Strangford published her second book Eastern Shores of the Adriatic in 1864 it had a final anonymous chapter title "Chaos," which is attributed to her husband, Percy Smythe, 8th Viscount Strangford. This work is considered important in his writing career. Her husband was twice president of the Royal Asiatic Society in the 1860s. He died in 1869 and as they had no children his titles became extinct.

== Widow and nurse ==
Following her husband's death Strangford volunteered to serve as a nurse in (probably) University College Hospital in London. In 1874 her studies led her to advocate a change in the way that nurses were trained. She published Hospital Training for Ladies: an Appeal to the Hospital Boards in England. She advocated that nurses should be allowed to train and work part-time. She believed that the training to be a nurse would benefit many women in their role within a family. This idea did not gain official backing as the major objective at the time was to establish nursing as a profession and not as a part-time activity for amateurs.

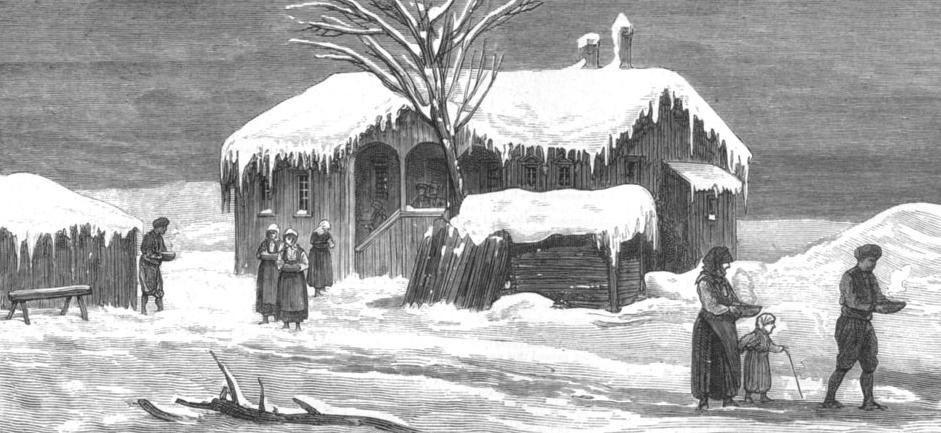
One of the hospitals she helped create in Batak where a massacre had taken place in May 1876

The war crimes that were taking place in Bulgaria in 1876 gained her attention. Christians had suffered massacres by the Ottomans and Strangford initially joined one committee and then she set up her own. Thousands of pounds were raised by the Bulgarian Peasants Relief Fund and she went to Bulgaria in 1876 with Robert Jasper More, eight doctors and eight nurses. Both she and More wrote letters to The Times to report and gather more funds. Strangford believed that the Bulgarians and not the Serbs would be important as the Ottoman Empire shrank. These were views that she had shared with her husband. Strangford found the Bulgarians to just need the tools for their own self-improvement and she was impressed that their first priority was a school. She built a hospital at Batak and eventually other hospitals were built at Radilovo, Panagiurishte, Perushtitsa, Petrich and at Karlovo. She also provided subsidies to a flour mill and a number of saw mills.

In 1883 Queen Victoria awarded her the Royal Red Cross for creating, with Dr Herbert Sieveking, the Victoria Hospital, Cairo. The hospital continued in operation thanks to a grant of £2,000 per year from the Egyptian government, taking in local students for training and offering first class accommodation on a private basis.

Strangford edited A Selection from the Writings of Viscount Strangford on Political, Geographical and Social Subjects which she published in 1869 and Original Letters and Papers upon Philology and Kindred Subjects in 1878. She also published her brother-in-law's novel Angela Pisani after his death, and helped found the Women's Emigration Society with Caroline Blanchard which arranged for British women to find jobs abroad.

In her later years, Strangford had a London home at 3 Upper Brook Street, Mayfair. She died on board SS Lusitania of a stroke in 1887. She was travelling through the Mediterranean en route for Port Said where she was to create a hospital for seamen. Her body was returned to London and buried in Kensal Green Cemetery.

== Legacy ==
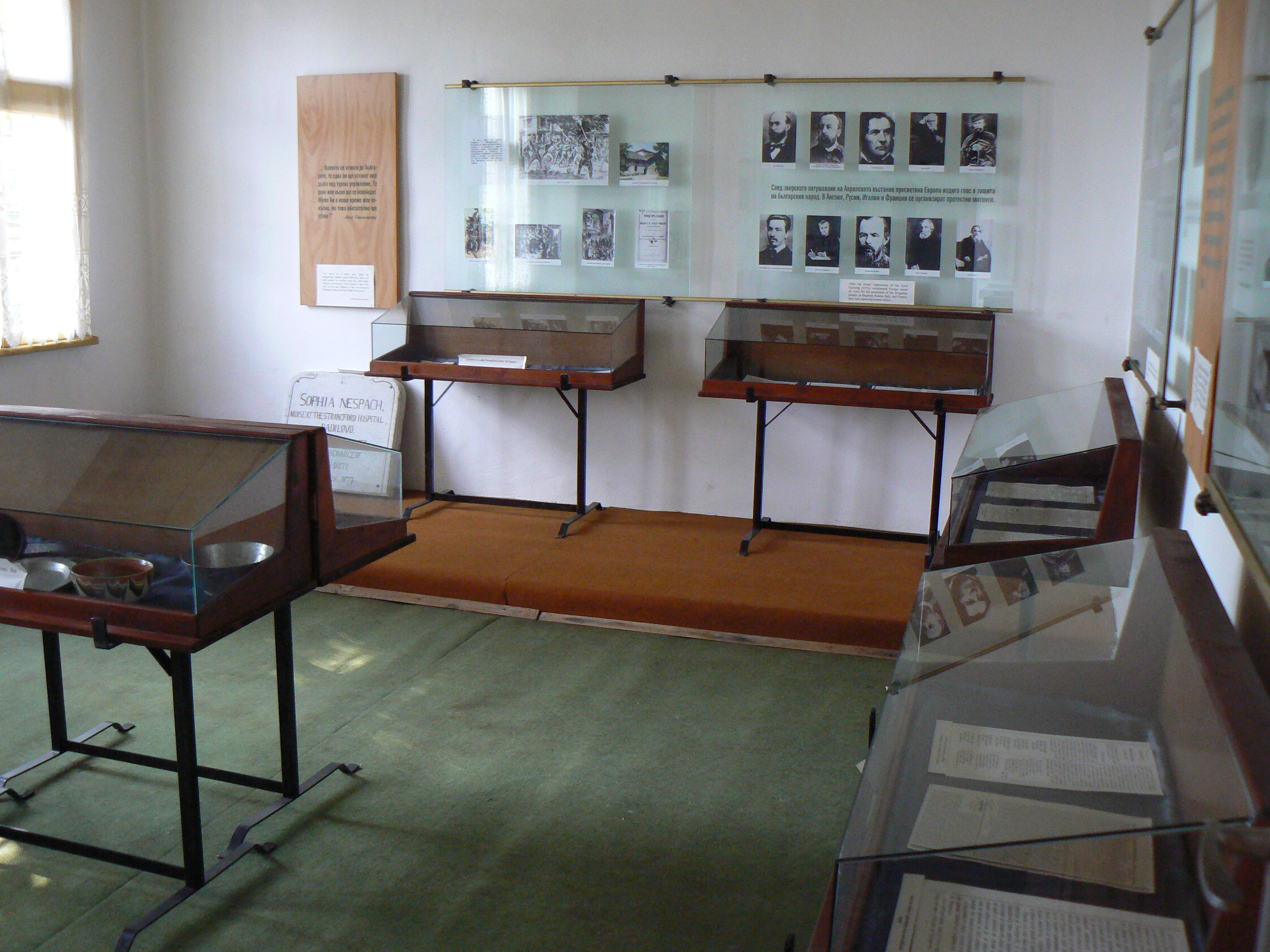
An exhibition about Strangford in a museum in Radilovo

Strangford is best remembered in Bulgaria where a number of memorials and streets are named in her honour. Plovdiv Regional Historical Museum has a permanent display about Lady Strangford.

In Sofia's Museum of Natural history, there is a herbarium created by Strangford.
