= Charles Lushington =

Charles Lushington may refer to:

- Charles Lushington (1785–1866), English Whig Member of Parliament (MP) for Ashburton 1835–1841
- Charles Manners Lushington (1819–1864), English Conservative MP for Canterbury 1854–1857
