= Charles Manners Lushington =

British politician (1819–1864)

Member of Parliament for Canterbury
- In office 19 August 1854 – 29 June 1857
- Monarch: Victoria
- Prime Minister: Thomas Pelham-Holles
- Preceded by: Henry Plumptre Gipps; Henry Butler-Johnstone
- Succeeded by: Henry Butler-Johnstone; Sir William Somerville, Bt

Personal details
- Born: 27 April 1819 Cleveland Square, Bayswater, West London, England
- Died: 27 November 1864 (aged 45) Boulogne-sur-Mer, Northern France
- Party: Conservative
- Spouse: Henriette Stafford Northcote (m. 1846)
- Education: Oriel College, Oxford (1843: MA)

Charles Manners Lushington (27 April 1819 – 27 November 1864) was an English Conservative politician who sat in the House of Commons from 1854 to 1857.

== Background and education ==
Lushington was born on 27 April 1819 at 4 Cleveland Square, Bayswater, West London, the youngest son of Stephen Rumbold Lushington and Anne Elizabeth, née Harris. He was educated at Eton College, Oriel College, Oxford, graduating in 1843 with a MA, and later elected Fellow of All Souls College, Oxford. He served in the East Kent Yeomanry Cavalry of which he became captain in November 1853.

== Political career ==
He was elected as a Member of Parliament (MP) for the borough of Canterbury at a by-election in August 1854, after the borough's writ of election had been suspended when a Royal Commission found that there had been extensive corruption. Lushington held the seat until the 1857 general election, which he did not contest. At the 1859 general election, he unsuccessfully contested the borough of Nottingham.

== Family ==
On 5 May 1846, Lushington married Henrietta Stafford Northcote, daughter of Sir Henry Stafford Northcote, 7th Baronet and Agnes Mary Cockburn, at Trinity Church, Marylebone. She died on 20 January 1900 (aged 79) at Florence. Formerly of Norton Court, Kent, he died on 27 November 1864 (aged 45) at Boulogne-sur-Mer, Northern France. Their daughter Agnes married Walter Phillimore, 1st Baron Phillimore in 1870.

Parliament of the United Kingdom
Vacant Writ suspended (1853) Title last held by Henry Plumptre Gipps; Henry Butler-Johnstone	Member of Parliament for Canterbury; 1854 – 1857; With: Sir William Somerville, Bt	Succeeded by Henry Butler-Johnstone; Sir William Somerville, Bt
