= Philip Smythe, 2nd Viscount Strangford =

English politician (1634–1708)

Philip Smythe, 2nd Viscount Strangford (23 March 1634 – 8 August 1708) was an English politician who sat in the House of Commons in 1660.

Smythe was the son of Thomas Smythe, 1st Viscount Strangford of Westenhanger and Sturry, Kent and his wife Lady Barbara Sidney, the daughter of Robert Sidney, 1st Earl of Leicester. He inherited the title on the death of his father in 1635. In 1659, he was arrested at Canterbury, with his half-brother Thomas Colepeper, following the uprising, and was released on parole and bail for £5,000.

In 1660, Smythe was elected Member of Parliament for Hythe in the Convention Parliament.

== Family ==
Smythe married firstly his cousin Isabella Sidney, daughter of Robert Sidney, 2nd Earl of Leicester. After her death in 1663, he married Mary, daughter of George Porter. He was succeeded by his son, Endymion.

Peerage of Ireland
Preceded by Thomas Smythe	Viscount Strangford; 1365–1708	Succeeded by Endymion Smythe
