= Thomas Smythe (customer) =

English politician (1522–1591)

The Honourable Thomas Smythe
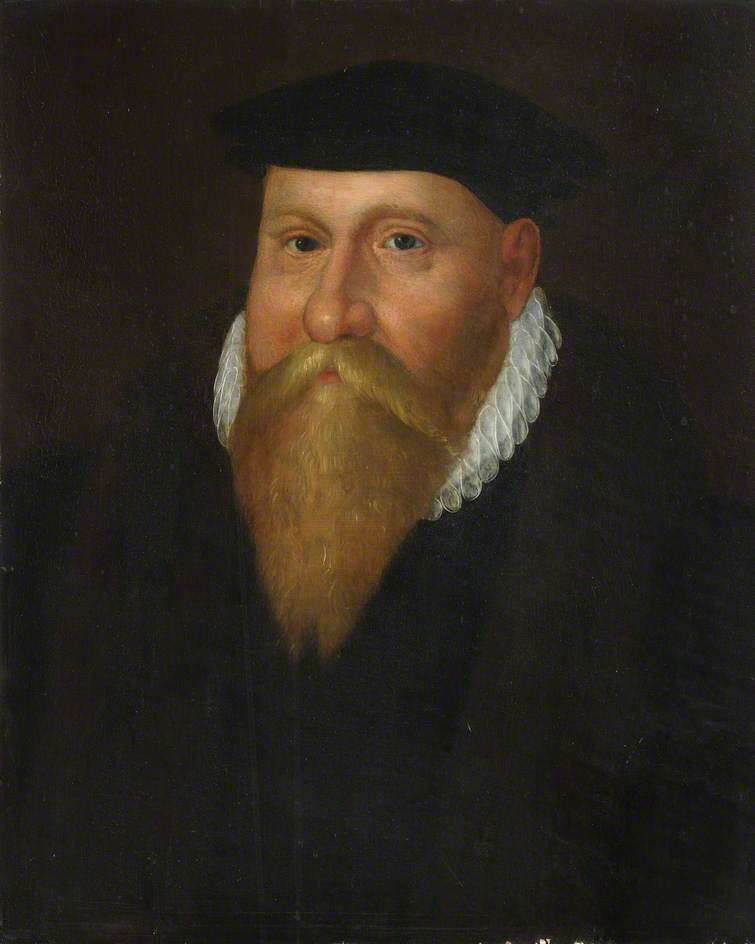
- Thomas 'Customer' Smythe
- Born: 1522
- Died: 7 July 1591 (aged 68–69)
- Resting place: St Mary's Church, Ashford; 51.14865°N 0.87276°E
- Occupations: Politician; merchant; financier
- Spouse: Alice Judde (m. 1554)
- Children: Andrew Smythe; Sir John Smythe; Sir Thomas Smythe; Henry Smythe; Sir Richard Smythe; Robert Smythe; Symon Smythe; Elizabeth Smythe; Mary Smythe; Joan Smythe; Katherine Smythe; Alice Smythe; Ursula Smythe
- Parents: John Smythe (father); Joan Brouncker (mother)

Thomas Smythe or Smith (1522 – 7 June 1591), of London, Ashford and Westenhanger, Kent was the collector of customs duties (also known as a "customer") in London during the Tudor period, and a member of parliament for five English constituencies successively in the 1550s and 1560s. His son and namesake, Sir Thomas Smythe, was the first governor of the East India Company, treasurer of the Virginia Company, and an active supporter of the Virginia colony.

== Early life ==
Thomas Smythe, born in 1522, was the second son of John Smythe (d. 1538) of Corsham, Wiltshire, and Joan Brouncker, the daughter of Robert Brouncker of Melksham, also in Wiltshire. His father, a substantial yeoman and clothier, left Smythe a farm in the Hundred of Amesbury, Wiltshire, which provided an annual income of £20 (equivalent to £16,056 in 2025). After his father's death, Smythe moved to the City of London to seek his fortune; he was aged about sixteen at the time.

At an unknown date, Smythe was admitted to his father's merchant guild, the Haberdashers, and later to the Worshipful Company of Skinners, where he secured the favour of Sir Andrew Judde, a wealthy merchant, Kent landowner, and Lord Mayor of London in 1550, to whom he was later related by marriage.

== Career ==
Smythe was one of the two members of parliament for Tavistock in October 1553, for Aylesbury in April 1554, for Rye in November 1554, for Winchelsea in 1555, and for Portsmouth in 1563.

During the reign of Mary I, Smythe purchased the Office of the Customs from one Mr. Cocker for £2,500 (equivalent to £1,237,438 in 2025). He was confirmed in his appointment at the Customs on the accession of Elizabeth I in 1558, and he continued in the office for 11 years. In 1567, he appears to have incurred her Majesty's severe displeasure, having been accused of issuing privy warrants leading to a £6,000 loss; his friend William Cecil, Lord Burghley, intervened and helped Smythe escape imprisonment. Cecil persuaded the Queen to be lenient, arguing that if Smythe was allowed more time he would repay this loss.

Elizabeth began to require larger and larger fines to renew Smythe's leases in order to replenish her exchequer. Over time, Smythe became unable to meet these demands and again fell under her Majesty's severe displeasure. In October 1589 his counteroffer of a more modest payment was rejected.

== Marriage and children ==
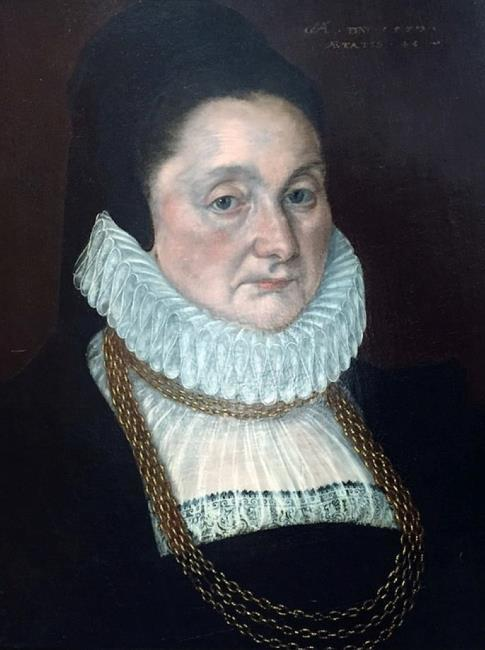
Portrait of Alice Judde (c. 1532-1593), wife of Thomas Smythe, 1579, Cornelis Ketel

In around 1554, Smythe married Alice Judde, the eldest daughter of Sir Andrew Judde by his first wife, Mary Murfyn, by whom he had 13 children:

- Andrew Smythe, eldest son, who died an infant.
- Sir John Smythe (1557–1608), second son, of Ostenhanger, in 1576 married Elizabeth Fineaux (daughter of Sir John Fineaux, Chief Justice of the King's Bench).
- Sir Thomas Smythe (1558–1625), who married firstly, Judith Culverwell, the daughter of Richard Culverwell; secondly Joan Hobbs, the daughter of William Hobbs; and thirdly, Sarah Blount, the daughter of William Blount. He had no issue by his first two marriages; by his third marriage he had three sons and a daughter. His widow, Sarah, married Robert Sidney, 1st Earl of Leicester.
- Henry Smythe, of Corsham and Baydon, Wiltshire, who married Elizabeth Owen, daughter of Thomas Owen, Serjeant-at-law. He was mentioned in his mother's will, dated 1592, proved 11 May 1598.
- Sir Richard Smythe (d. 1628), of Leeds Castle, who married firstly Elizabeth Scott, the daughter of Sir Thomas Scott (and widow of John Knatchbull), and in 1589 married Jane White (daughter of John White of London, widow of Samuel Thornhill).
- Symon Smythe (d. 1596), was killed at the siege of Cadiz in June 1596.
- Elizabeth Smythe, who was unmarried at the time of Smythe's death in 1591, and later married Sir Henry Fanshawe (son of Thomas Fanshawe who married, secondly, Sir Henry's wife's sister, Joan).
- Mary Smythe, who married Robert Davy (or Davis) of London.
- Joan Smythe (d. 1622), who married Thomas Fanshawe, Esquire of Ware Park, Hertfordshire.
- Katherine Smythe (d. 1617), who married, at the age of sixteen, Sir Rowland Hayward (d. 1593), Lord Mayor of London in 1571, then Sir John Scott (d. 1616) of Nettlestead, Kent, son of Sir Thomas Scott of Scot's Hall in Kent and Elizabeth Baker of Sissinghurst; her mural monument survives in Nettlestead Church.
- Alice Smythe, who married William Harris
- Ursula Smythe, who married, firstly, Simon Harding; secondly, William Butler (or Boteler) of Biddenham, Bedfordshire.

== Death ==
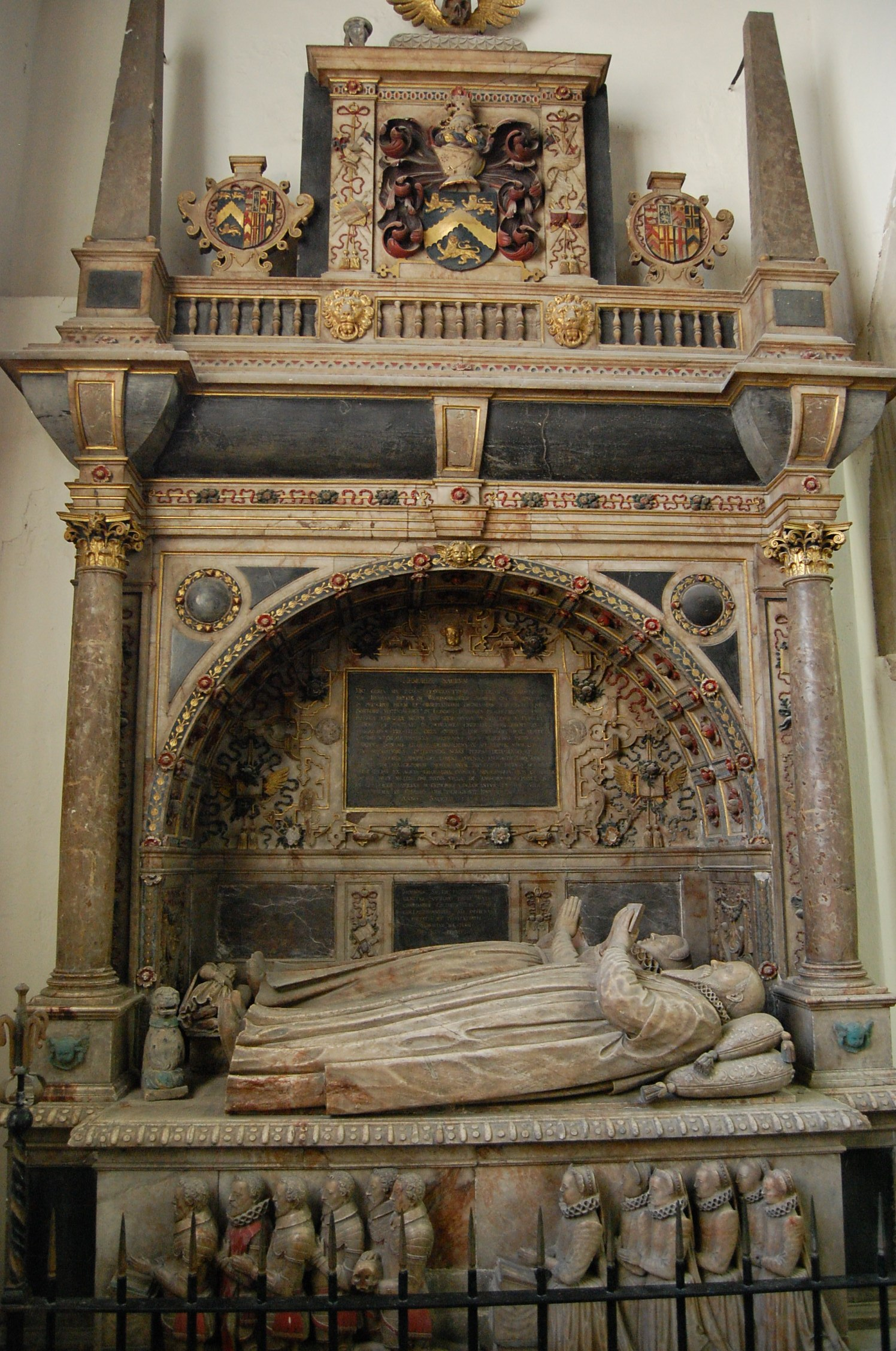
Memorial to Thomas "Customer" Smythe, St Mary's Church, Ashford: "Thomas Smith lies with his wife and 13 children under a canopy of coloured flowers and gold leaves."

Due to his increasing infirmities and perhaps the stress of trying to meet the Queen's demands, Smythe died on 7 June 1591, some 18 months after losing his office, leaving his widow, then aged about sixty, six sons and six daughters. He was buried in the Smythe chapel in St Mary's Church, Ashford, where three monuments are dedicated to him and two of his sons, Richard and John. His widow died in 1593 and was buried beside her husband in St Mary's Church, Ashford.

The following is a translation of the Latin inscription on Smythe's monument:

Sacred to memory. Here, in the certain hope of a blessed resurrection, is interred the most illustrious man Thomas Smythe, Esq., of Westenhanger, who, on account of his tried fidelity and obedience towards his Sovereign, was deemed worthy to be set over the duties of the Customs in the Port of London, which dues he afterwards purchased of the Sovereign by the payment of an annual rent of £30,000, and he presided over them with singular liberality towards those of higher rank, and love towards the trading interests. He expended the means with which an Almighty and Merciful Providence had blessed him freely and willingly, in relieving the poor to the Glory of God, in cherishing the professors of true religion, promoting literature, and, for the advantage of the State, in fitting out ships for long voyages, in discovering new countries, and opening copper mines. And now, full of years, when he had completed his sixty-ninth year, and brought up six sons and also six daughters, by his dearest wife, herself sixty years of age, daughter and heiress of Sir Andrew Judde, Knt., Lord of the Manor of this Town of Ashford, who are placed by marriage in families of some distinction, he departed this life in firm faith in Christ on the 7th of June in the year of grace 1591. John Smythe, his eldest son, most sorrowfully erected this monument to the best of fathers and the most beloved of mothers as a memorial of his duty and affection, and a record to posterity, the other sons and daughters joining in his grief.

== Arms ==
Coat of arms of Thomas Smythe
Adopted 1591 Crest A leopard's head erased Argent, spotted Sable, collared and lined Or. Escutcheon Azure, a chevron engrailed between three lions passant gardant Or.

== Notes ==
Parliament of England
Preceded by Edward Underhill; Anthony Lyte	Member of Parliament for Tavistock; 1553; With: Richard Wilbraham	Succeeded by Richard Mayo; John Fitz
Preceded by Constituency created (1553)	Member of Parliament for Aylesbury; 1553; With: Humphrey Moseley	Succeeded by William Rice; John Walwyn
Preceded by John Holmes; Richard Fletcher	Member of Parliament for Rye; 1554–1555; With: John Holmes	Succeeded by John Holmes; Reginald Mohun
Preceded by William Egleston; John Cheney	Member of Parliament for Winchelsea; 1555; With: John Peyton	Succeeded by George Howard; John Fowler
Preceded by William Wynter; George Brooke alias Cobham	Member of Parliament for Portsmouth; 1563–1567; With: William Wynter	Succeeded by Lawrence Blundestone; Henry Slater
