= Frederick Romilly =

British Whig politician and cricketer

Lieutenant-Colonel Frederick Romilly (21 March 1810 – 6 April 1887), was a British Whig politician who sat in the House of Commons from 1850 to 1852 and a cricketer who played for Marylebone Cricket Club (MCC).

Romilly was a younger son of Sir Samuel Romilly and Anne, daughter of Francis Garbett, of Knill Court, Herefordshire. Lord Romilly was his elder brother. In 1836 he played one match for MCC against Cambridge University in which he scored one run in each innings.

Romilly was returned to parliament as one of two representatives for Canterbury in March 1850, a seat he held until the 1852 general election.

Romilly married Lady Elizabeth Amelia Jane, daughter of Gilbert Elliot-Murray-Kynynmound, 2nd Earl of Minto, in 1848. He died at Westminster in April 1887, aged 77. Lady Elizabeth died in January 1892. They had two children:

- Samuel Henry Romilly (d. 14 March 1940). He married Lady Arabella Charlotte Carnegie, daughter of James Carnegie, 9th Earl of Southesk and Lady Catherine Hamilton Noel. They had two sons, and two daughters.
- Elizabeth Mary Romilly (c. 1853 – 17 Apr 1950). She married Sir Horace Alfred Damer Seymour, son of Frederick Charles William Seymour and Lady Augusta Hervey, and grandson of Lord Hugh Seymour, and Frederick William Hervey, 1st Marquess of Bristol. They had two sons, and four daughters one of which, Mary, married Charles Bigham, 2nd Viscount Mersey.

Parliament of the United Kingdom
Preceded by Hon. George Smythe; Lord Albert Denison	Member of Parliament for Canterbury; 1850 – 1852; With: Hon. George Smythe	Succeeded by Henry Plumptre Gipps; Hon. Henry Butler-Johnstone
