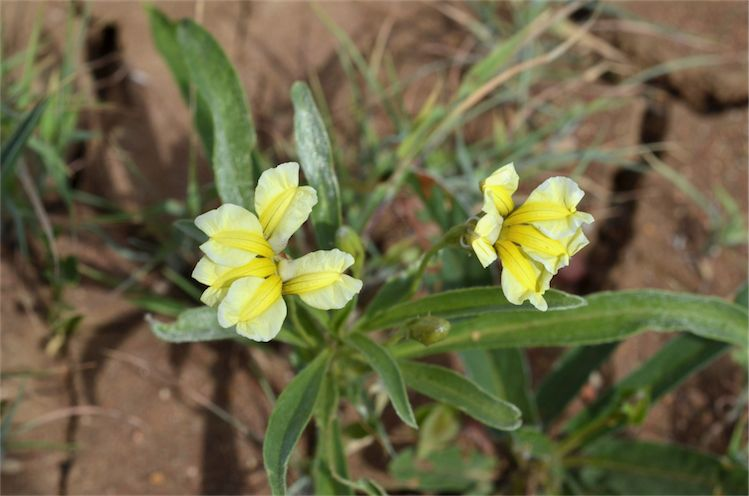
- Near Cornish Creek

Scientific classification
- Kingdom: Plantae
- Clade: Tracheophytes
- Clade: Angiosperms
- Clade: Eudicots
- Clade: Asterids
- Order: Asterales
- Family: Goodeniaceae
- Genus: Goodenia
- Species: G. strangfordii

Binomial name
- Goodenia strangfordii F.Muell.

Synonyms
- Goodenia strangfordii var. grandiflora Benth.; Goodenia strangfordii F.Muell. var. strangfordii; Goodenia strangfordii var. typica Domin nom. inval.

= Goodenia strangfordii =

Species of flowering plant

Goodenia strangfordii, commonly known as wide-leaved goodenia in the Northern Territory, is a species of flowering plant in the family Goodeniaceae and is endemic to northern Australia. It is an erect herb with narrow elliptic to lance-shaped stem leaves with the narrower end towards the base, and racemes of yellow flowers.

== Description ==
Goodenia strangfordii is an erect, spreading herb that typically grows to a height of up to 30 cm (12 in). The stem leaves are elliptic to lance-shaped with the narrower end towards the base, 50–120 mm (2.0–4.7 in) long 3–20 mm (0.12–0.79 in) wide. The flowers are arranged in racemes up to 100 mm (3.9 in) long with leaf-like bracts, each flower on a pedicel 40–70 mm (1.6–2.8 in) long. The sepals are lance-shaped, 4–5 mm (0.16–0.20 in) long and the corolla is yellow, 15–19 mm (0.59–0.75 in) long. The lower lobes of the corolla are 6–7 mm (0.24–0.28 in) long with wings up to 3.5 mm (0.14 in) wide. Flowering mainly occurs from May to October.

== Taxonomy and naming ==
Goodenia strangfordii was first formally described in 1867 by Ferdinand von Mueller in Fragmenta phytographiae Australiae. The specific epithet (strangfordii) honours Percy Smythe, the 8th Viscount Strangford.

== Distribution and habitat ==
This goodenia grows in heavy, seasonally wet soil in the Northern Territory, Queensland and the far north-east of Western Australia.

== Conservation status ==
Goodenia strangfordii is classified as of "least concern" in the Northern Territory and Queensland but as "Priority One" by the Government of Western Australia Department of Parks and Wildlife, meaning that it is known from only one or a few locations which are potentially at risk.
