= Victoria Hospital, Cairo =

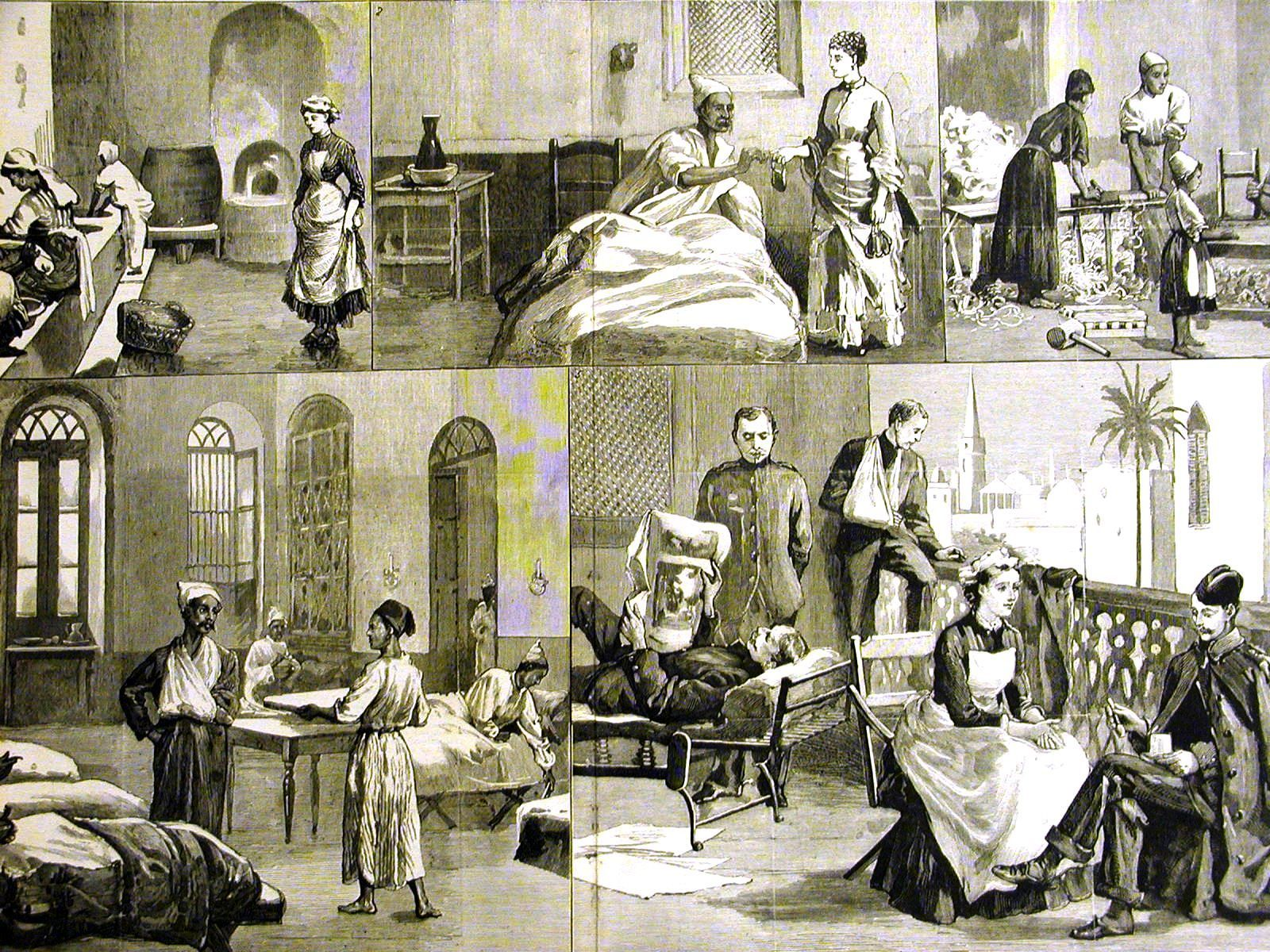
- Lady Strangfords Hospital Cairo, 1882

Geography
- Location: Cairo, Egypt

Organisation
- Funding: Annual grant of £2,000 from the Egyptian government; private fees

History
- Opened: 1883

The Victoria Hospital in Cairo, Egypt was founded by Viscountess Strangford with Dr Herbert Sieveking in 1883. The same year, Queen Victoria awarded Strangford the Royal Red Cross for her work. The hospital continued in operation thanks to a grant of £2,000 per year from the Egyptian government, taking in local students for training and offering first class accommodation on a private basis.
