= Henry Plumptre Gipps =

English lawyer and politician

Henry Plumptre Gipps (1813 – 2 July 1859) was an English lawyer and Conservative Party politician who sat in the House of Commons from 1852 to 1853.

Gipps was born at Norton, near Faversham, the son of the Rev. Henry Gipps and his wife Emma Maria Plumptre. He was educated at St John's College, Cambridge, being scholar in 1831 and graduating BA as 22nd Wrangler in 1835. He was called to the bar at Lincoln's Inn in 1838. He was an equity draftsman and conveyancer and was Recorder of Hythe.

At the 1852 general election Gipps was elected as a member of parliament (MP) for Canterbury. However the election was declared void on 21 February 1853 and the writ was suspended until August 1854. The report of the select committee found that the candidates agents had been guilty of bribery and noted that bribery and corruption had been carried on for some time at the Canterbury constituency.

Gipps lived at Elmley and died at Spa in 1859.

Parliament of the United Kingdom
Preceded by George Smythe; Frederick Romilly	Member of Parliament for Canterbury; 1852 – 1853; With: Henry Butler-Johnstone	Vacant Writ suspended (1853) Title next held by William Somerville; Charles Manners Lushington
