= Thomas Smythe =

English merchant and colonial administrator

Sir Thomas Smythe
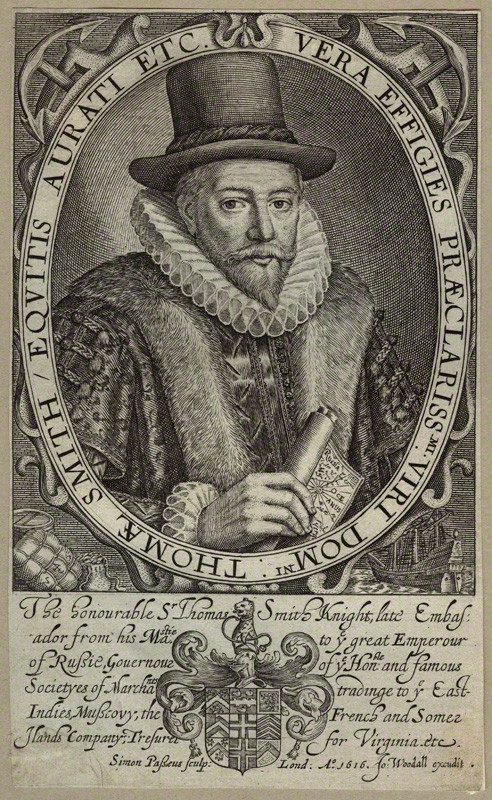
- Born: c. 1558
- Died: 4 September 1625 (aged 66–67); Sutton-at-Hone, Kent, England
- Occupations: Merchant, politician, colonial administrator
- Known for: Governor of the East India Company
- Spouse: Sarah Blount
- Children: 4
- Parent(s): Thomas "Customer" Smythe and Alice Judde

Sir Thomas Smythe (or Smith, c. 1558 – 4 September 1625) was an English merchant, politician and colonial administrator. He was the first governor of the East India Company and treasurer of the Virginia Company from 1609 to 1620 until enveloped by scandal.

== Early life ==
He was second surviving son of Thomas "Customer" Smythe of Westenhanger Castle in Kent, by his wife Alice, daughter of Sir Andrew Judde. His grandfather, John Smythe of Corsham, Wiltshire, was described as yeoman, haberdasher and clothier, and was High Sheriff of Essex for the year of 1532. His father was also a haberdasher, and was customer of the port of London. He purchased Westenhanger from Sir Thomas Sackville, and other property from Robert Dudley, Earl of Leicester. Thomas Smythe's elder son, Sir John Smythe or Smith (1556?–1608) of Westenhanger, was High Sheriff of Kent in 1600, and father of Thomas Smythe, 1st Viscount Strangford.

Thomas senior, one of thirteen children, was brought in his father's business, and was educated at Merchant Taylors' School (1571).

== Business and political career ==
In 1580, young Smythe was admitted to the freedom of the Worshipful Company of Haberdashers and also of the Worshipful Company of Skinners. He quickly rose to wealth and distinction after entering politics to augment his business.

Smythe was made Auditor for the City of London from 1597 to 1598, and Treasurer of St Bartholomew's Hospital from 1597 to 1601. In 1597, he was briefly elected to Parliament for Aylesbury. In 1599, he was elected alderman for Farringdon Without and chosen as one of the two sheriffs of the City of London for 1600.

Smythe financed numerous Elizabethan-era trade ventures and voyages of exploration during the early 17th century. In 1592, Smythe obtained settlement rights to the Virginia colony from Sir Walter Raleigh.

When the East India Company was formed in October 1600, Smythe was appointed as its first governor by the charter dated 31 December, a position he held for only four months.

In February 1600–01, Smythe, serving as London's sheriff, was suspected of being a supporter of the Robert Devereux, 2nd Earl of Essex who, on 8 February, went to Smythe's house in Gracechurch Street. Smythe advised Essex to turn himself in to John Garrard, the Lord Mayor of London. When Essex refused, Smythe left to confer with the Lord Mayor. When Smythe was later accused of complicity in the Essex Rebellion, he was examined before the Privy Council. He was fired from his office of sheriff and committed to the Tower of London. His imprisonment ended with Queen Elizabeth's death on 24 March 1603.

On 13 May 1603, after the accession of James I, Smythe was knighted. Later that year he was re-elected to Parliament for Dunwich in place of Sir Valentine Knightley, who was chosen to sit for Northamptonshire.

After one of his sons married intro the aristocracy, Smythe became part of the "court faction" along with Robert Rich, 2nd Earl of Warwick. In 1614, Smythe was elected Member of Parliament for Sandwich and for Saltash in 1622.

In 1603, Smythe was re-elected governor of the East India Company, and, with one break in 1606–1607, continued to hold that office until July 1621, when he was discovered to be involved in the Virginia Company scandal. During this period, the company established trade with India.

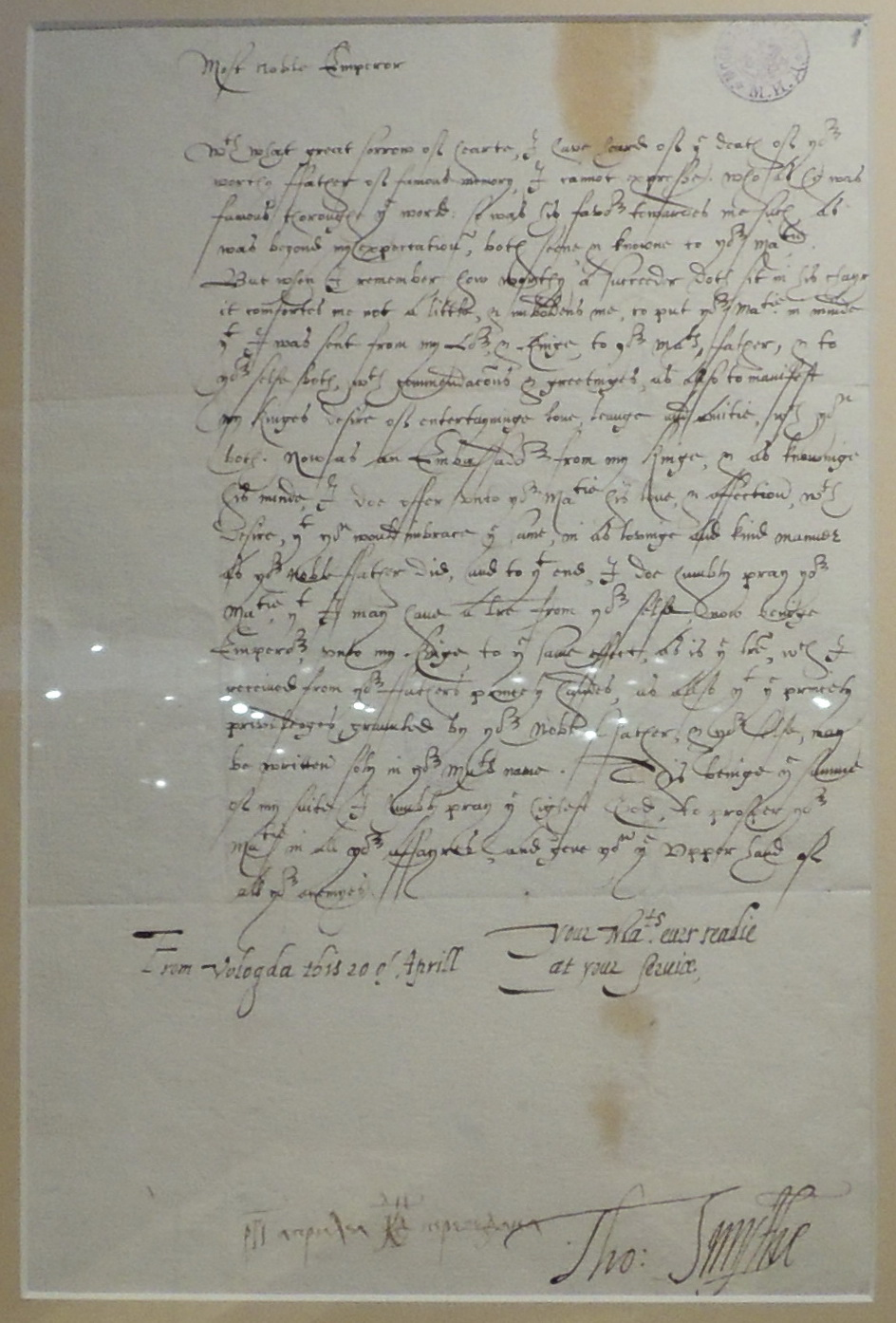
Thomas Smythe's letter to Fedor II of Russia (20 April 1605)

Meanwhile, in 1604, Smythe with his younger brother Richard Smythe were appointed as receivers for the Duchy of Cornwall, and, in June, was named special ambassador to the Russian Tsar Boris Godunov. Like Smythe's grandfather, Sir Andrew Judde, Lord Mayor of London (1550) and one of the founders of the Muscovy Company, Smythe involved himself in the Muscovy trade. Sailing from Gravesend on 13 June 1603, his party arrived at Arkhangelsk on 22 July, and was taken by way of Kholmogory and Vologda to Yaroslavl, where the tsar was.

During that winter, Smythe obtained new privileges for the company. In the spring he went to Moscow to meet with associates. He returned to Arkhangelsk and sailed for England on 28 May 1604. He was elected MP for Dunwich that same year.

In 1609, Smythe obtained a royal charter for the London Virginia Company. He became the new colony's treasurer and de facto non-resident governor until his resignation in 1620—two years after Raleigh's execution, and two years before a major revolt caused by Smythe's policy of "rooting out" the native people. To address the new colony's many problems, Smythe ordered both the end of religious conversion of the Native Americans and the expansion of the tobacco crop.

In 1620, Smythe was formally charged with enriching himself at the expense of the company. King James revoked the colony's charter in 1624, making it a royal colony instead. Although Smythe was held to be partly to blame, and despite the king's hatred of tobacco and desire to form a Christian empire, Smythe nonetheless retained the king's support.

Parliamentarians urging the graft investigation included Nicholas Ferrar (Smythe's former deputy) and Edwin Sandys. The inquiry continued until Smythe's death in 1625, despite the King's refusal to accepted the charges against Smythe. The King's officials continued to consult Smythe on all important matters relating to shipping and to eastern trade.

For several years Smythe served as one of the navy's chief commissioners. Smythe was an original adventurer (shareholder) of the Somers Isles Company on its formation in 1615, having and also served as Governor (in England, with a Deputy Governor serving in the colony itself) of the Somers Isles (or Bermuda) from its official settlement by the Virginia Company in 1612, continuing in this role after its split with the Virginia Company in 1614. His connection with the East India Company, the Virginia Company and the Muscovy Company, also led Smythe to promote and support voyages for the discovery of the North-West Passage in North America. William Baffin named Smith Sound between Greenland and Ellesmere Island to honour the patron of his 1616 voyage of discovery. In January 1618–19, Smythe was appointed one of the commissioners for the settlement of the differences with the Dutch which, however, after years of discussion, remained for the time, unsettled.

== Private life ==
Although his name was often spelled "Smith", it was always written "Smythe" by the man himself, as well as by his extended family at Strangford. Smythe married three times. The first two wives must have died young and without issue. He was already married to his third wife, Sarah, daughter of William Blount, by the time Smythe was sheriff of London. They had one daughter who died unmarried in 1627; and three sons, two of whom seem to have died before their father. The eldest son, Sir John Smythe of Bidborough, married Isabella Rich, daughter of Robert Rich, 1st Earl of Warwick and Penelope Devereux. Their children included Letitia Isabella Smythe (d. 1714), who married John Robartes, 1st Earl of Radnor.

== Death and legacy ==
Smythe died at Sutton-at-Hone in Kent on 4 September 1625, and was buried there in St John's Church. An elaborate monument to his memory was installed there.

During his lifetime, Smythe amassed a large fortune, a considerable part of which he devoted to charitable purposes. He gave to Tonbridge School founded by his grandfather: one of the five day houses at the school is named after him. He also established several charities for the poor of the parish of Tonbridge.

A portrait belonging to the Skinners' Company has been identified with Smythe, though it has been supposed to be that of Sir Daniel Judd. An engraving by Simon van de Passe is inserted in the Grenville copy of Smyth's Voiage and Entertainment in Rushia (London, 1605). It is reproduced in Wadmore's memoir (1892).
