= Plovdiv Regional Historical Museum =

Historical Museum in Plovdiv
- Регионален исторически музей Пловдив; Regionalen istoricheski muzey Plovdiv
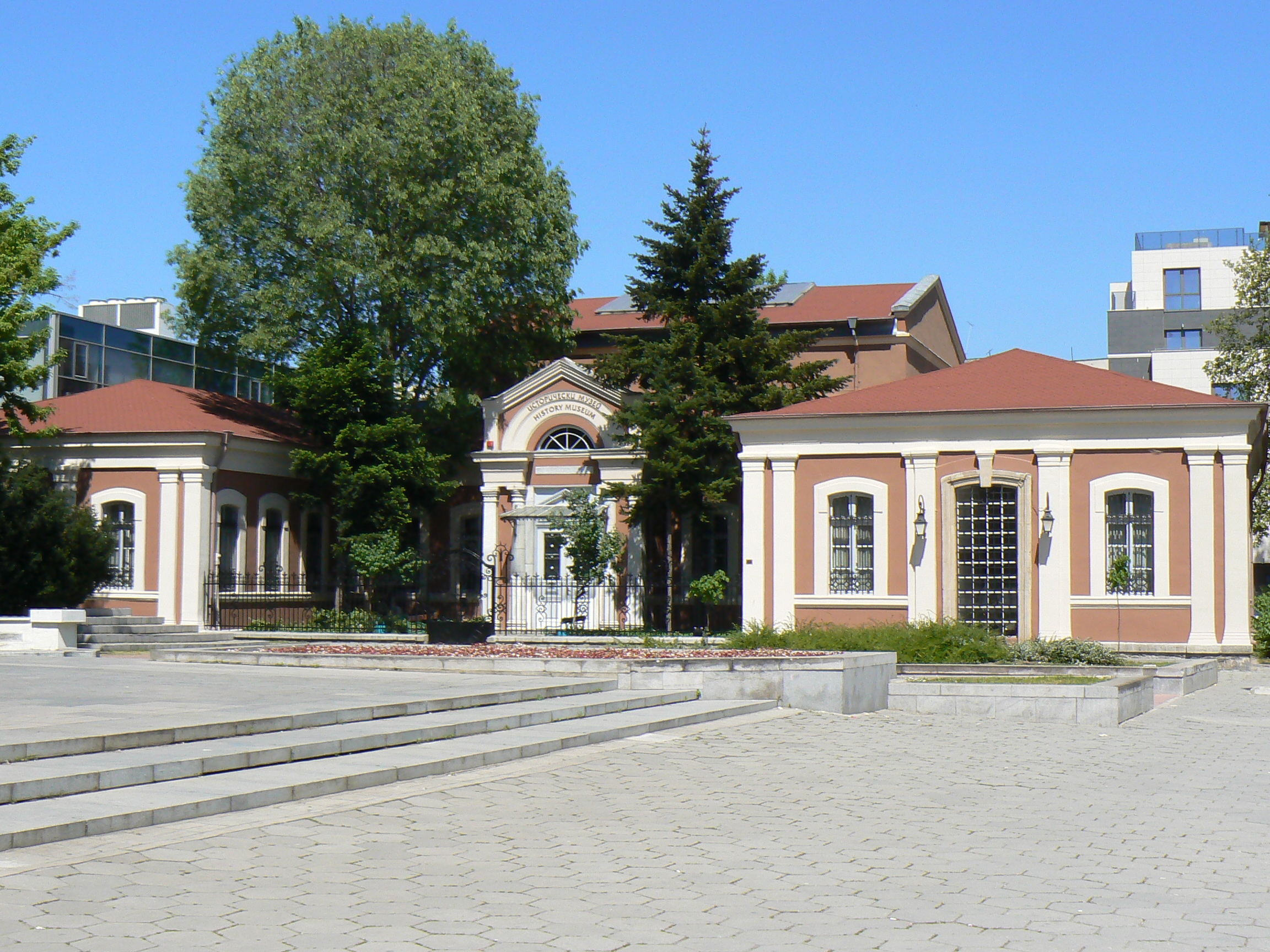
- The museum from the outside

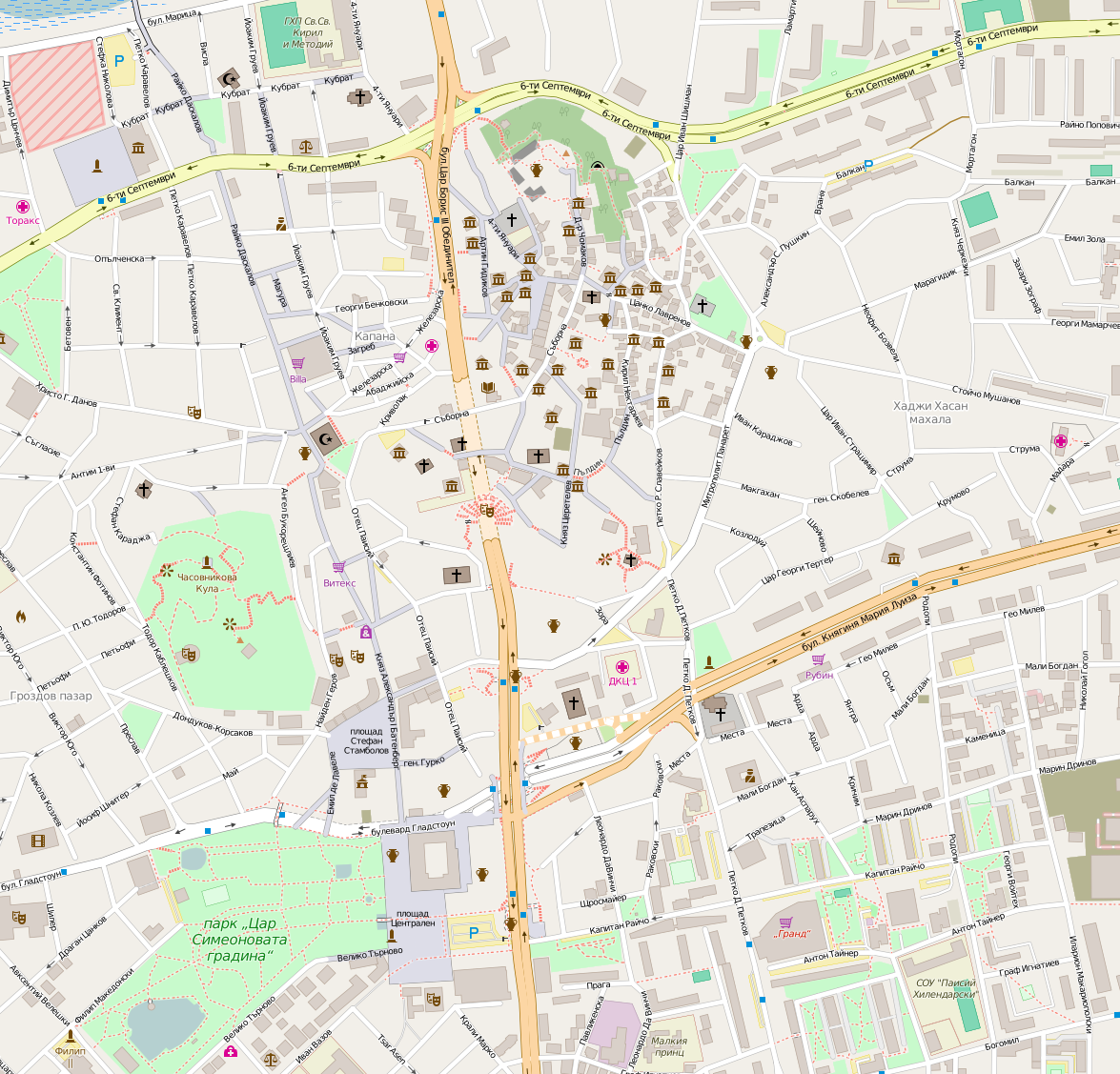
- Location within Plovdiv City Center
- Established: 1951
- Location: 1 Saedinenie Sq., 4000 Plovdiv, Bulgaria
- Coordinates: 42.149722°N 24.754444°E
- Type: History Museum, Historic site
- Website: www.historymuseumplovdiv.org

The Plovdiv Regional Historical Museum (Bulgarian: Регионален исторически музей Пловдив, Regionalen istoricheski muzey Plovdiv) is a historical museum in the city of Plovdiv, Bulgaria. Established in 1951, it covers the history of Plovdiv from the 15th century until today (the older history is presented in the Plovdiv Archaeological Museum). It has three departments, each occupying a separate historic building.

== History ==
The Regional History Museum in Plovdiv was established in 1951 as a research and cultural organization for investigation, study, preservation and display of cultural assets from the past of the city of Plovdiv and its region in the period 15th–20th century.

== Expositions ==
The History Museum in Plovdiv manages four expositions.

- The Bulgarian National Revival exposition is situated in the house of the Greek merchant from Thessaloniki, Dimitris Georgiadi. It was built in 1846 and occupies 825 m^{2} (8,880 sq ft). The exhibition traces the history of Plovdiv from the 15th to the 19th century, a period of Ottoman rule. The exhibit includes documents and photographs that display the ethnic diversity and economic development of Plovdiv, and the struggle for education, separation of church and state, and national independence. The exhibit also includes a display about Lady Strangford.
- The Unification of Bulgaria exposition is dedicated to Plovdiv's key role in the events of 6 September 1885, as the capital of Eastern Rumelia. It covers the period from the Treaty of Berlin of 1878, which split Bulgarian lands into five parts, to the Serbo-Bulgarian War of 1885. The department occupies the former building of the Eastern Rumelian Regional Assembly (Parliament) designed by the Savoy architect, Pietro Montani, and built 1883–1885. The exposition was opened in 1985 on the occasion of the 100th anniversary of the Unification of the Principality of Bulgaria and East Rumelia, an event which has become a national symbol. Five exhibition halls show personal belongings, award tokens, firearms, photos and documents of participants in the unification and the Serbo-Bulgarian War.
- The book-publishing exposition follows the stages of development of publishing during the Bulgarian National Revival and Plovdiv's role as its centre. The department takes up six halls in the house of the noted publisher and enlightener, Hristo G. Danov, from the early 19th century.
- The Museum Centre of Modern History displays art and photographic exhibitions, presentations, seminars and other public events.
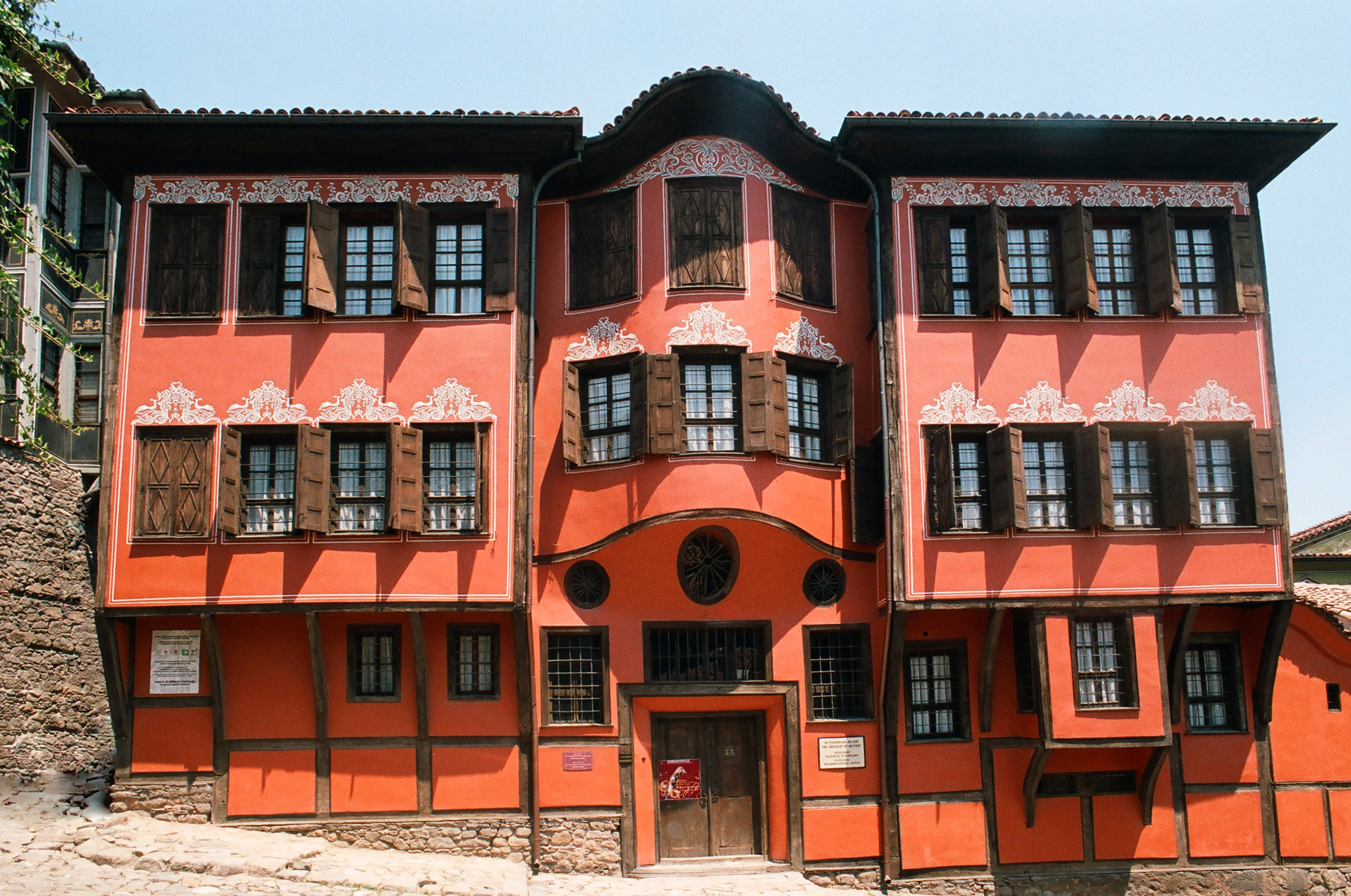
Georgiadi House

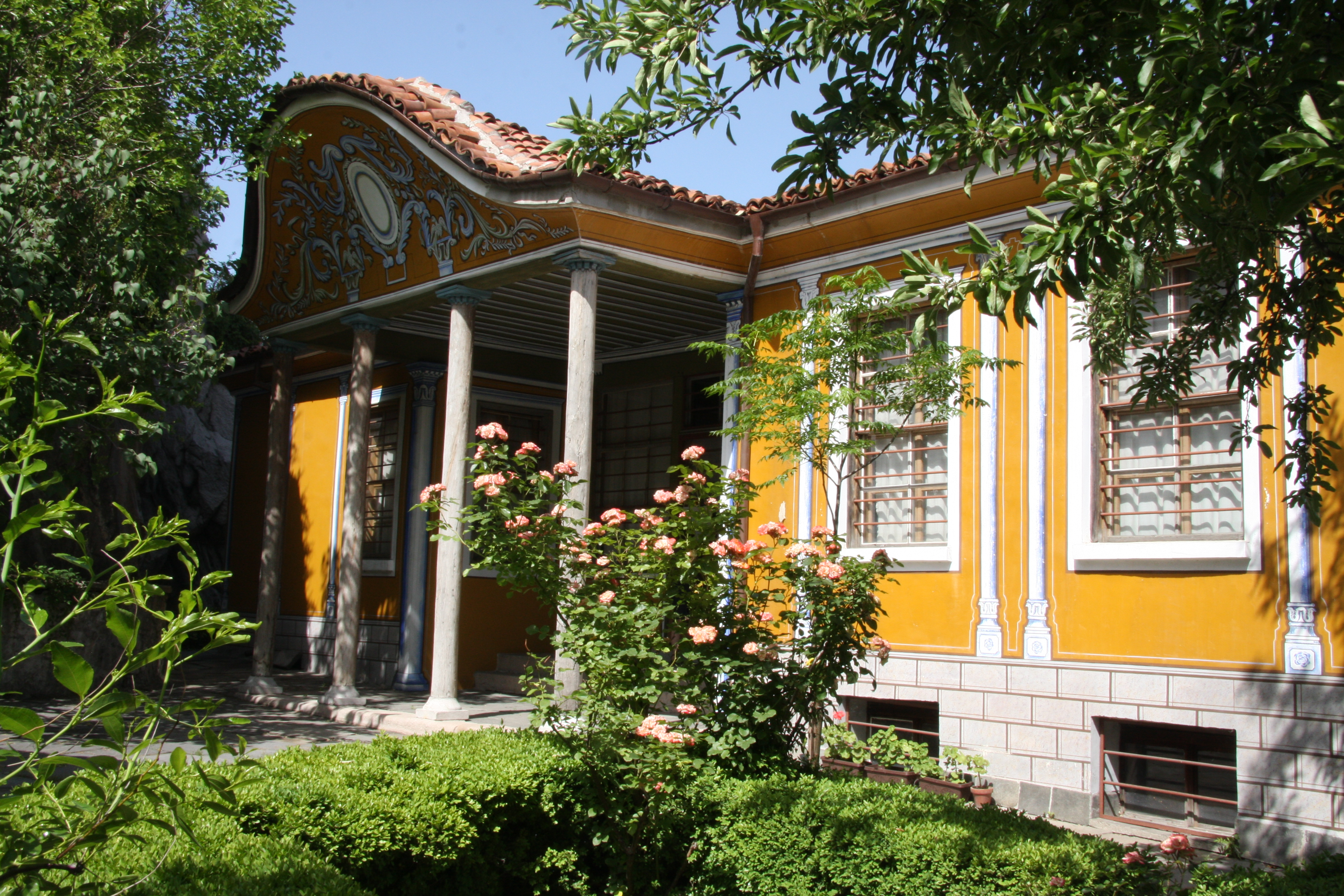
Hristo Danov House

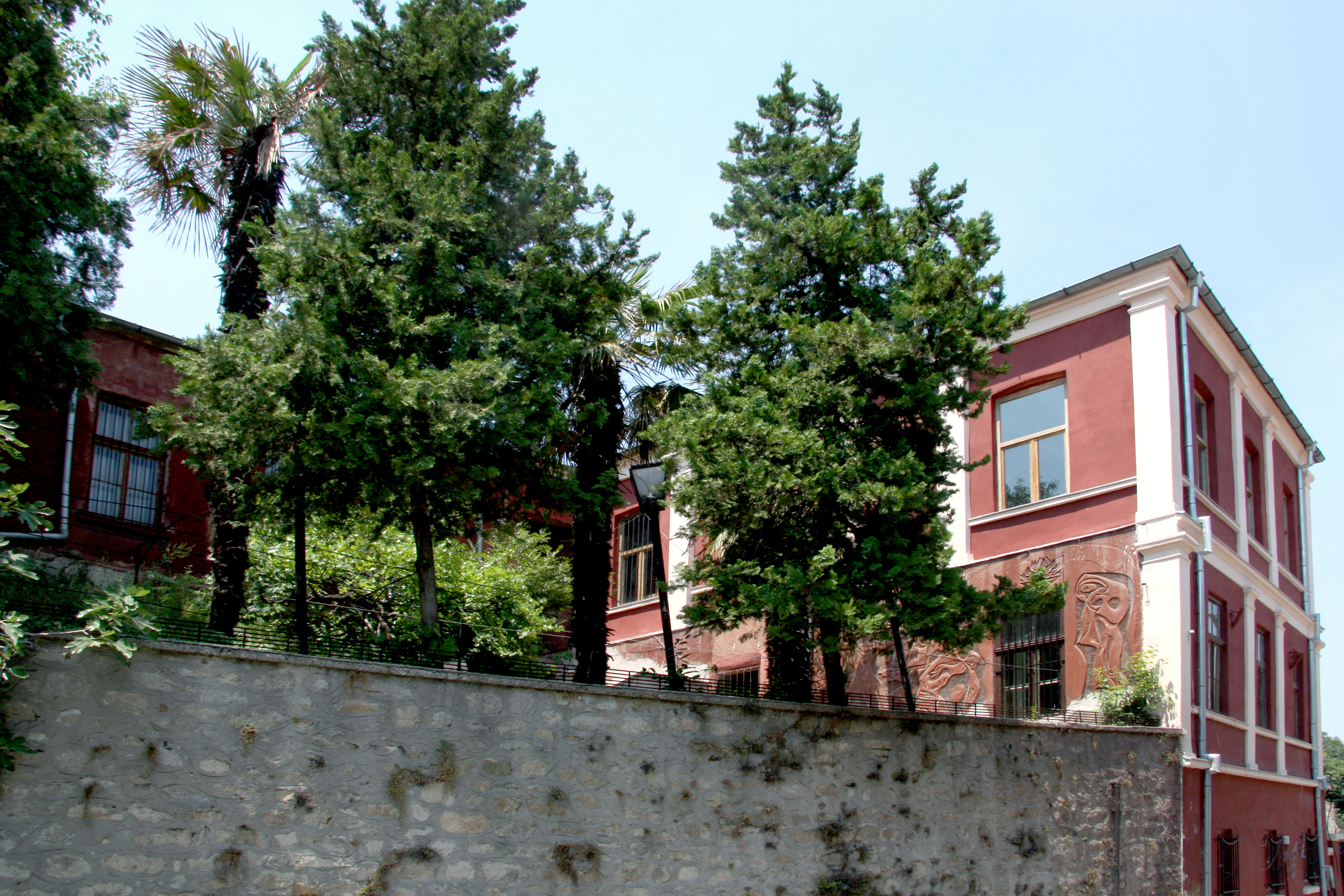
Modern History Museum
