= Viscount Strangford =

Title in the Peerage of Ireland (cr. 1628)

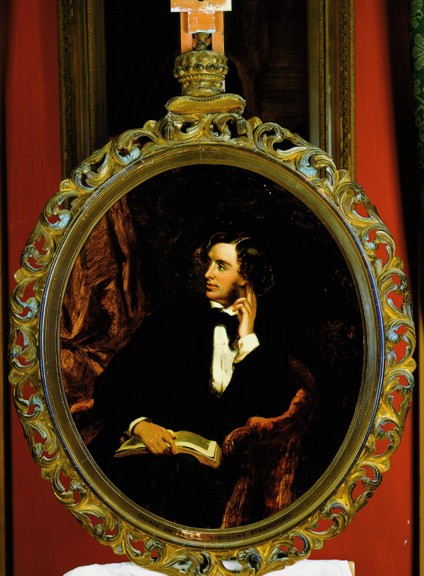
George Smythe, 7th Viscount Strangford.

Viscount Strangford was a title in the Peerage of Ireland. It was created in 1628 (397 years ago) for Sir Thomas Smythe. He was a son of John Smith (also Smythe) J.P., High Sheriff of Kent 1600–1601, also M.P. for Aylesbury (in 1584) and Hythe (in 1586, 1587 and 1604), and grandson of Thomas Smythe, of Westenhanger Castle, collector of customs for London, haberdasher, and M.P.

The sixth Viscount was British ambassador to Portugal, Sweden, the Ottoman Empire and Russia. In 1825 he was created Baron Penshurst, of Penshurst in the County of Kent, in the Peerage of the United Kingdom, enabling him and his descendants to sit in the House of Lords. He was succeeded by his eldest son, the seventh Viscount. He was a Conservative politician, best known for his association with Benjamin Disraeli and the Young England movement. He died young and was succeeded by his younger brother, the eighth Viscount. He was a man of letters. The titles became extinct on his death in 1869 (156 years ago), although his widow, Viscountess Strangford, lived until 1887.

== Viscounts Strangford (1628) ==
- Thomas Smythe, 1st Viscount Strangford (1599–1635)
- Philip Smythe, 2nd Viscount Strangford (1634–1708)
- Endymion Smythe, 3rd Viscount Strangford (died 1724)
- Philip Smythe, 4th Viscount Strangford (1715–1787)
- Lionel Smythe, 5th Viscount Strangford (1753–1801)
- Percy Clinton Sydney Smythe, 6th Viscount Strangford (1780–1855)
- George Augustus Frederick Percy Sydney Smythe, 7th Viscount Strangford (1818–1857)
- Percy Ellen Algernon Frederick William Sydney Smythe, 8th Viscount Strangford (1825–1869) married Emily Anne Beaufort
