= Henry Butler-Johnstone =

British politician

Henry Butler-Johnstone (28 August 1809 – 1 April 1879) was a British Conservative Party politician, born Hon. Henry Butler, a younger son of James Butler, 13th Baron Dunboyne. He later assumed the surname of Johnstone, due to his marriage with Isabella Margaret Munro, daughter of Sir Alexander Munro and niece and heiress of General Johnstone of Corehead.

He was elected at the 1852 general election as a Member of Parliament (MP) for Canterbury, but in 1853 the election was declared void on petition, and the writ was suspended until 1854.

Johnstone regained the seat at the 1857 general election, was re-elected in 1859 and resigned from the House of Commons on 27 January 1862 by the procedural device of accepting appointment as Steward of the Manor of Northstead. At the resulting by-election on 6 March 1862, his son Henry Munro-Butler-Johnstone was elected to succeed him as MP for Canterbury.

Butler-Johnstone died on 1 April 1879 at his residence in Mayfair after a long illness.

Parliament of the United Kingdom
Preceded by George Smythe; Frederick Romilly	Member of Parliament for Canterbury; 1852 – 1853; With: Henry Plumptre Gipps	Vacant Writ suspended until 1854
Preceded by Charles Manners Lushington; Sir William Somerville, Bt	Member of Parliament for Canterbury; 1857 – 1862; With: Sir William Somerville, Bt	Succeeded by Henry Munro-Butler-Johnstone; Sir William Somerville, Bt
