= Cleveland Square =

English private garden square

Coordinates: 51°30′53.16″N 0°10′56.99″W

Cleveland Square is a private and gated garden square in the predominantly classically conserved Bayswater district of the City of Westminster, north of Central London's Hyde Park. The housing is in tall, tree-shaded rows, stuccoed and with pillared porches, with some discreet infilling of other housing behind.

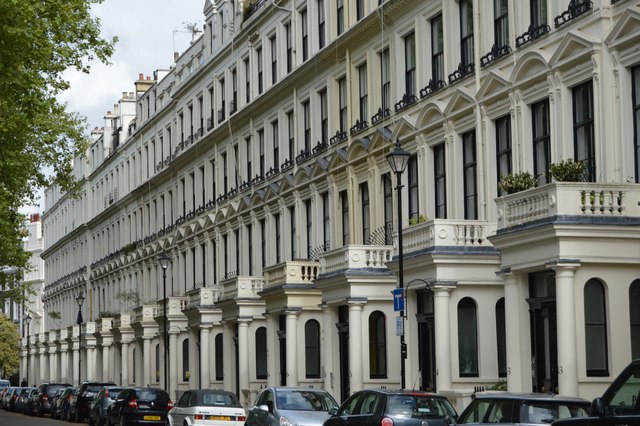
Cleveland Square

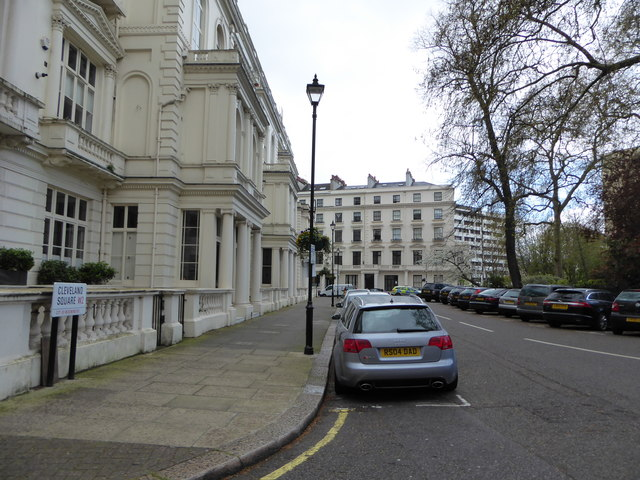
Cleveland Square and Grade II listed Hallfield Estate in background

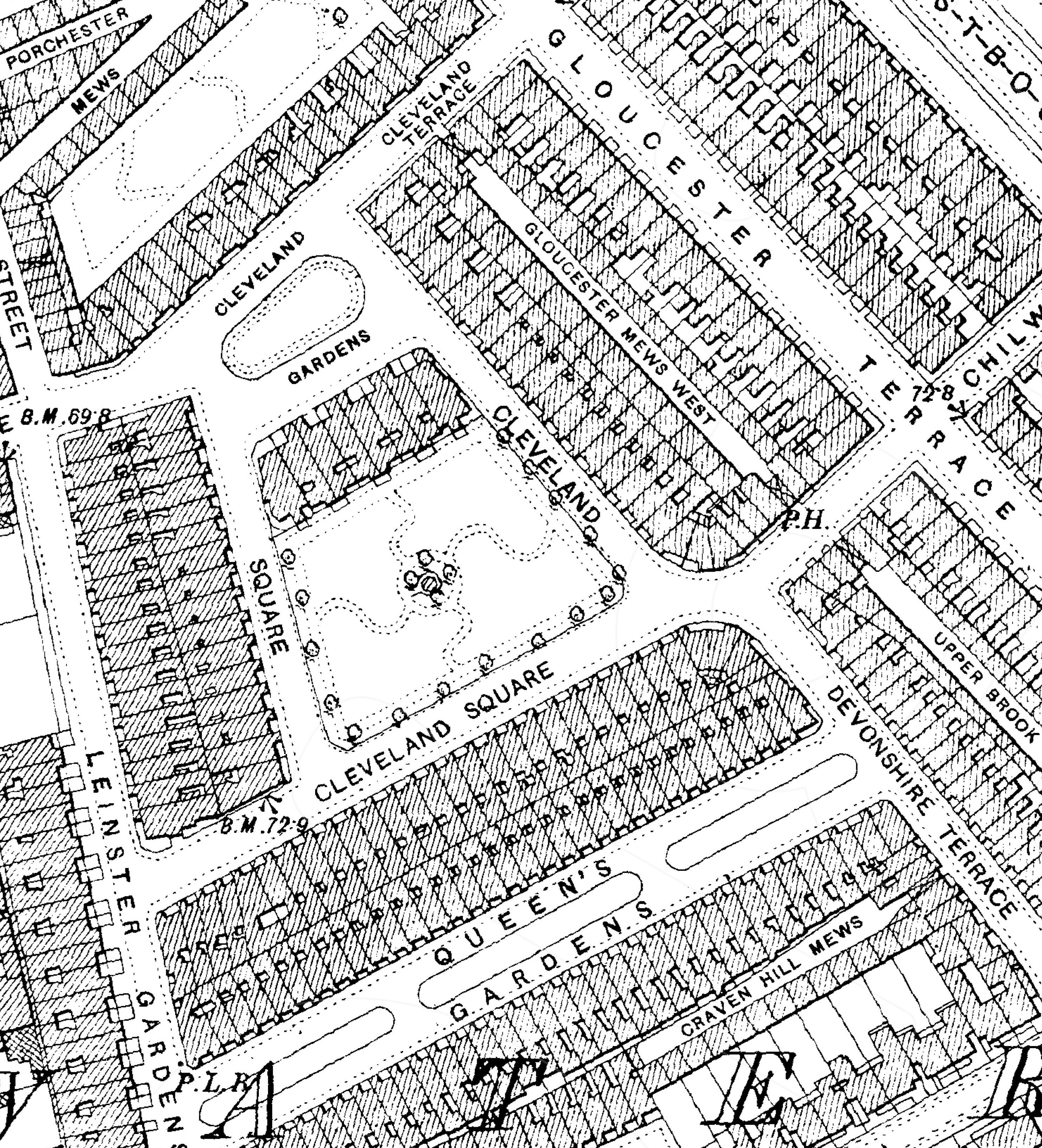
Cleveland Square on an 1896 Ordnance Survey map showing the layout.

The square was built in the 1850s along with Cleveland Gardens and Cleveland Terrace.

They are likely named after the speculator and development manager William Frederick Cleveland of Maida Vale who worked across the broader area of Paddington, particularly its formerly semi-independent farmstead (and reputed manor) of Bayswater.

The homes and manicured, landscaped communal gardens were built around 1855, and were designed for short-term rental and long leases by the upper echelons of international society. The small River Westbourne ran under the west end of the square.

The most lavish use of space of the overall area was in Cleveland Square, where the north side was made to be the only one not separated by the quiet road from the gardens, and enjoyed a further small green across its road to the north. Houses on the other sides were leased between 1852 and 1854 to Henry de Bruno Austin, a land-developer active in

Paddington and later in outer suburbs.

== Notable residents ==
- Sir Cusack Patrick Roney, managing director of the Grand Trunk Railway Company of Canada, died in Cleveland Square in 1868.
- Samuel Montagu
- Lionel Rothschild
- George Tupou V, King of Tonga, lived at 25 Cleveland Square.
