= George Smythe, 7th Viscount Strangford =

British Conservative politician

The Right Honourable The Viscount Strangford
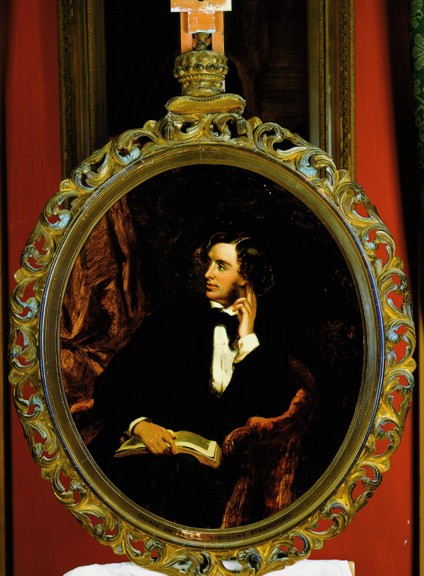

Under-Secretary of State for Foreign Affairs
- In office 27 January 1846 – 29 June 1846
- Monarch: Victoria
- Prime Minister: Sir Robert Peel
- Preceded by: The Viscount Canning
- Succeeded by: Edward Stanley

Personal details
- Born: 16 April 1818
- Died: 23 November 1857 (aged 39)

George Smythe, 7th Viscount Strangford (16 April 1818 – 23 November 1857), styled The Honourable George Smythe until 1855, was a British Conservative politician, best known for his association with Benjamin Disraeli and the Young England movement. He served briefly as Under-Secretary of State for Foreign Affairs in 1846 under Sir Robert Peel.

== Background and education ==
Smythe was born in Stockholm, Sweden, the son of Percy Smythe, 6th Viscount Strangford, by Ellen Burke, daughter of Sir Thomas Burke. He attended Tonbridge School and Eton College, and was later admitted to St John's College, Cambridge.

== Political career ==
Smythe's father had been Disraeli's friend during the 1830s, and had sponsored the latter for the Carlton Club (along with Lord Chandos). The younger Smythe believed in the sort of romantic Toryism espoused by Lord John Manners. Both of them were heavily influenced by Frederick Faber, an apostle of John Henry Newman, leader of the Oxford Movement. Disraeli and Smythe had known each other through the latter's father since an early age, but it was in the House of Commons that the two became close. Smythe sat as a Member of Parliament for Canterbury from 1841 until 1852, when he was defeated. Along with Disraeli, Manners, and Alexander Baillie-Cochrane, they comprised "Young England", a sect of the Conservative Party which, in espousing a romantic Toryism, was often at odds with the moderate, business-like administration of then-Prime Minister Sir Robert Peel.

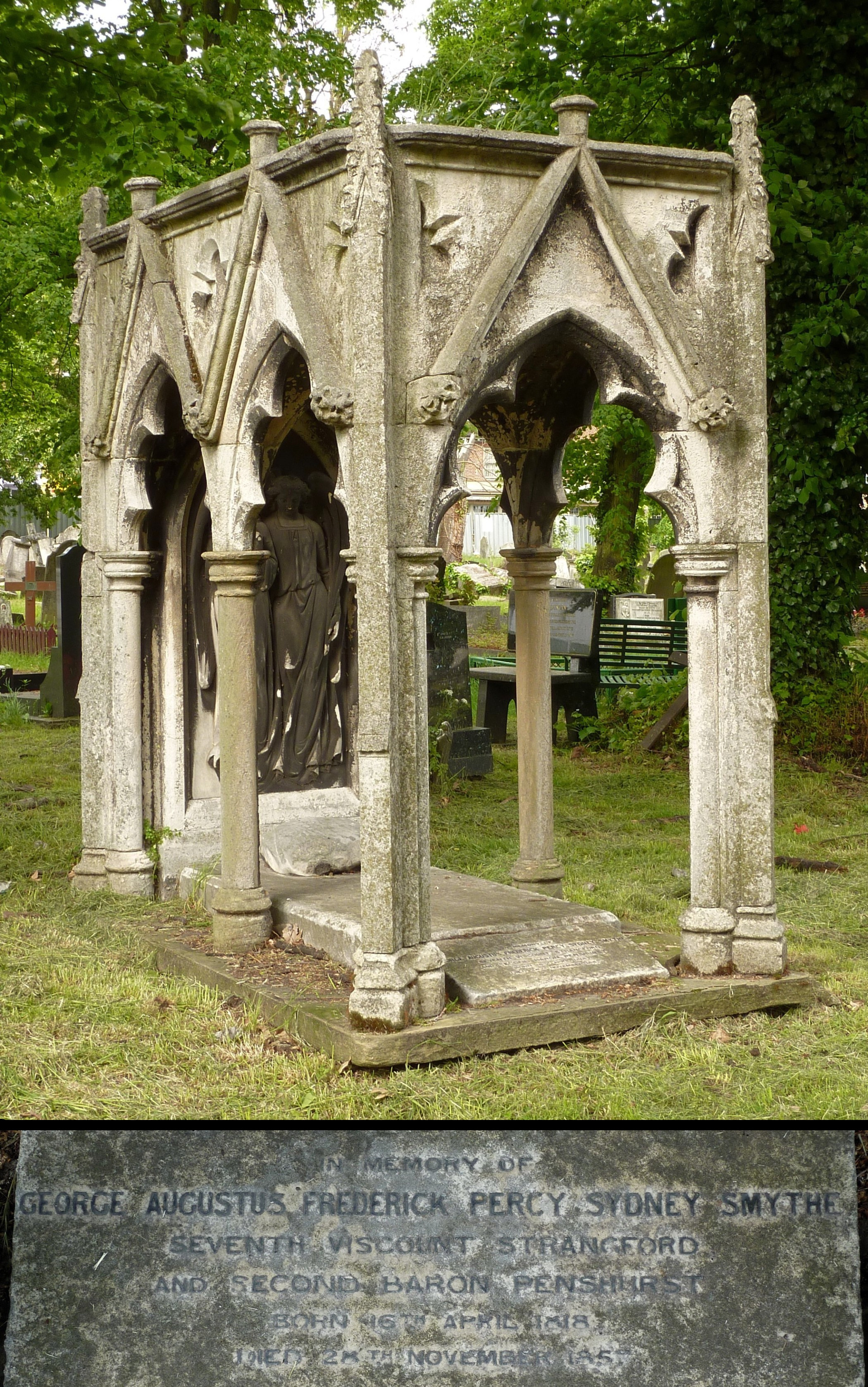
Smythe's grave at Kensal Green Cemetery, London, pictured in 2014

Young England finally splintered over the Maynooth Grant. In 1845 Peel proposed to increase the annual subsidy granted to the Catholic seminary at Maynooth, in Ireland. Smythe, possibly under pressure from his father, supported Peel, as did Lord John Manners. Disraeli, then in open rebellion against Peel, opposed the grant. Lord Blake, Disraeli's biographer, noted that Disraeli's speech was "essentially ad hominem" and that Disraeli had a "poor case." In January 1846 Smythe accepted minor office in Peel's government as Under-Secretary of State for Foreign Affairs. Nevertheless, Smythe and Disraeli apparently remained close friends until the former's death. The title character in Disraeli's novel Coningsby was modelled after Smythe, and Smythe wrote to Disraeli in 1852 that "you were of old the Cid and Captain of my boyish fanaticism."

Like his father, Smythe had literary tastes. In 1844 he wrote Historic Fancies, a collection of poems and essays, and his novel Angelo Pisani was published posthumously, with a memoir of the author in 1875.

Smythe's career was shattered later in 1846 when he was caught in a summerhouse with the 21-year-old Lady Dorothy Walpole the daughter of Horatio Walpole, 3rd Earl of Orford. Newspaper gossip alleged that he got her pregnant, and then refused to marry her. Lady Dorothy was hastily married off to an elderly cousin. In the nineteenth century, social and political ruin often went hand-in-hand. At his last electoral appearance in 1852, Smythe fought a duel with his fellow MP, Colonel Romilly (the last such encounter in England), and lost the election in a landslide.

== Personal life ==
Smythe succeeded to his father's peerage in 1855 and died on 27 November 1857 at the relatively young age of 39 at Bradgate House, Groby, Leicestershire. His title passed to his younger brother, Percy Smythe, 8th Viscount Strangford.

Parliament of the United Kingdom
Preceded by Lord Albert Conyngham; James Bradshaw	Member of Parliament for Canterbury; 1841 – 1852; With: James Bradshaw 1837–47; Lord Albert Conyngham 1847–50; Frederick Romilly 1850–52	Succeeded by Henry Plumptre Gipps; Henry Butler-Johnstone
Political offices
Preceded by The Viscount Canning	Under-Secretary of State for Foreign Affairs; 1846	Succeeded by Edward Stanley
Peerage of Ireland
Preceded by Percy Smythe	Viscount Strangford; 1855–1857	Succeeded by Percy Smythe
