= Henry de Bruno Austin =

Henry de Bruno Austin (bapt. 17 January 1791 – 21 December 1869) was an English property developer in Victorian London, who planned large housing estates in Ealing and Lancaster Gate but went bankrupt before they could be fully realised.

He was born in Clyst Honiton, Devon, to Thomas and Hester Havel. Austin. He was baptised there 17 January 1791. He was a brother-in-law to Charles Dickens and his daughter, Audrey, married a wealthy American horse breeder, Charles Knebelcamp. He died in December 1869 and was buried in Broadclyst, Devon.
