= Westenhanger Castle =

Coordinates: 51°5′40″N 1°1′53″E

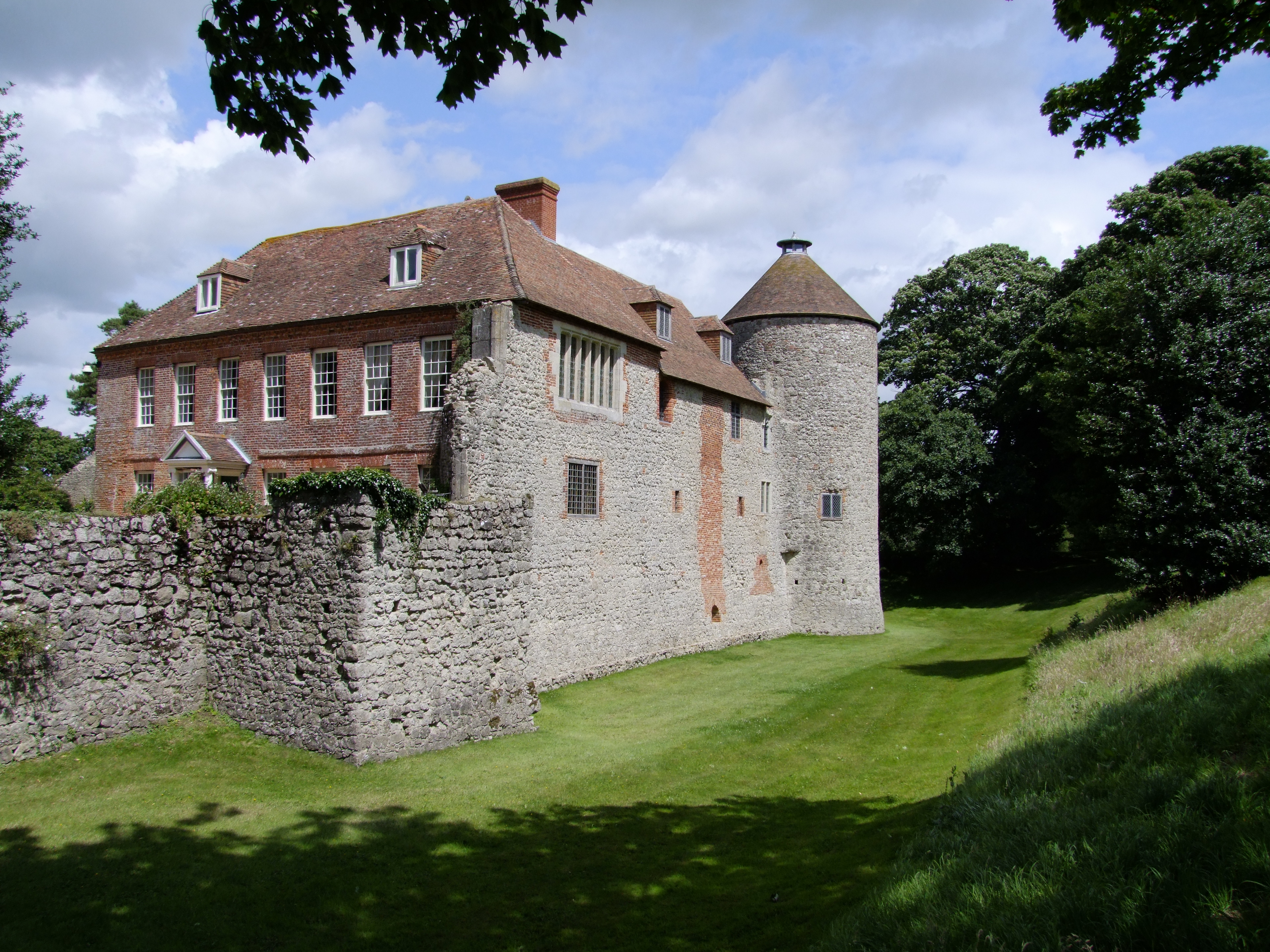
Westenhanger Castle.

Westenhanger Castle is a fortified manor house once owned by royalty, located next to Westenhanger railway station and the grandstand of Folkestone Racecourse in Kent. The castle has endured a period of steady decline to near ruination in recent years, but the current owners have engaged a programme of consolidation, conservation and restoration to the castle and adjoining buildings. It is now being used as a conference and wedding venue.

== History ==
Westenhanger Castle was a fortified 14th-century quadrangular manor house reflecting the opulence of its owners at that time. However, its history began almost 1,000 years ago, in 1035, when King Canute owned the estate.

The de Criol family, descendants of Bertram de Criol, were initially responsible in 1343 for the building of a permanent structure on the site. The castle stayed in the family until the Wars of the Roses when Sir Thomas de Criol or Kyriell was beheaded the day after the Second Battle of St Albans by order of Queen Margaret of Anjou. Sir Thomas de Criol had no sons, and Westenhanger came to his son-in-law, Sir John Fogge. The manor house at the time contained 126 rooms.

Westenhanger has a rich history with royalty and nobility, being connected with Henry II, Rosamund de Clifford, Edward Poynings, Henry VIII, Queen Elizabeth I, Customer Smythe and Lord Strangford.

In 1588, under the ownership of Customer Smythe, Queen Elizabeth used the castle as the command centre for Kent's 14,000 troops who were to defend the south coast from the Spanish Armada.

In 1656, the exiled Charles II was persuaded to return to England, and Westenhanger, ideally located close to the English coast. Thousands of armed men were instructed to hide in the surrounding woodlands and when the King entered the house, word would be given for them to rush in and murder the King and his followers. However, the King was forewarned as he was about to leave for England.

Westerhanger descended in the Smythe family until the death in 1869 without issue of Percy Smythe, 8th Viscount Strangford, the last Viscount Strangford. The Westerhanger estate was inherited by his nephew Capt Hugh Baillie, who died without issue in 1876.

== Current ==
Through the centuries, the castle has been reduced in size and suffered serious neglect. Since the mid-1990s, the current owners have been working with English Heritage to consolidate the stonework and prevent further deterioration of the manor house, castle walls and associated buildings. The impressive medieval barns which stand intact outside the curtain wall have recently been reunited with the castle under one ownership and work is ongoing to restore these barns to something near their original state.

It is now being hired out as a conference and wedding venue. Access is via the entrance to the racecourse, off the Westenhanger segment of Stone Street.

== Colonisation of America ==
Westenhanger Castle is now home to a replica of the Discovery, one of the three ships that entered Chesapeake Bay on 13 May 1607. Sir Thomas Smythe, the founder of the expedition, was the son of Thomas ‘Customer’ Smythe, who was granted Westenhanger (or Ostenhanger, as it was then) as a reward for his service as the Queen's collector of imports. The younger Thomas commissioned the construction of Discovery for the East India Company in 1600 and, along with the Susan Constant and Godspeed, the ship sailed for Virginia on 19 December 1606, under captain John Smith, arriving on 13 May the following year.

As a result of this expedition, the first permanent English-speaking settlement in the New World was subsequently established at Jamestown, Virginia, forming a base for what would later become the United States of America.

On 19 December 2008, the replica of the Discovery was presented to Westenhanger Castle by the Jamestown UK Foundation, a charity set up to commemorate the 400th anniversary of the founding of Jamestown in 1607.
