= St Mary's Parish Church, Ashford =

St. Mary's Church
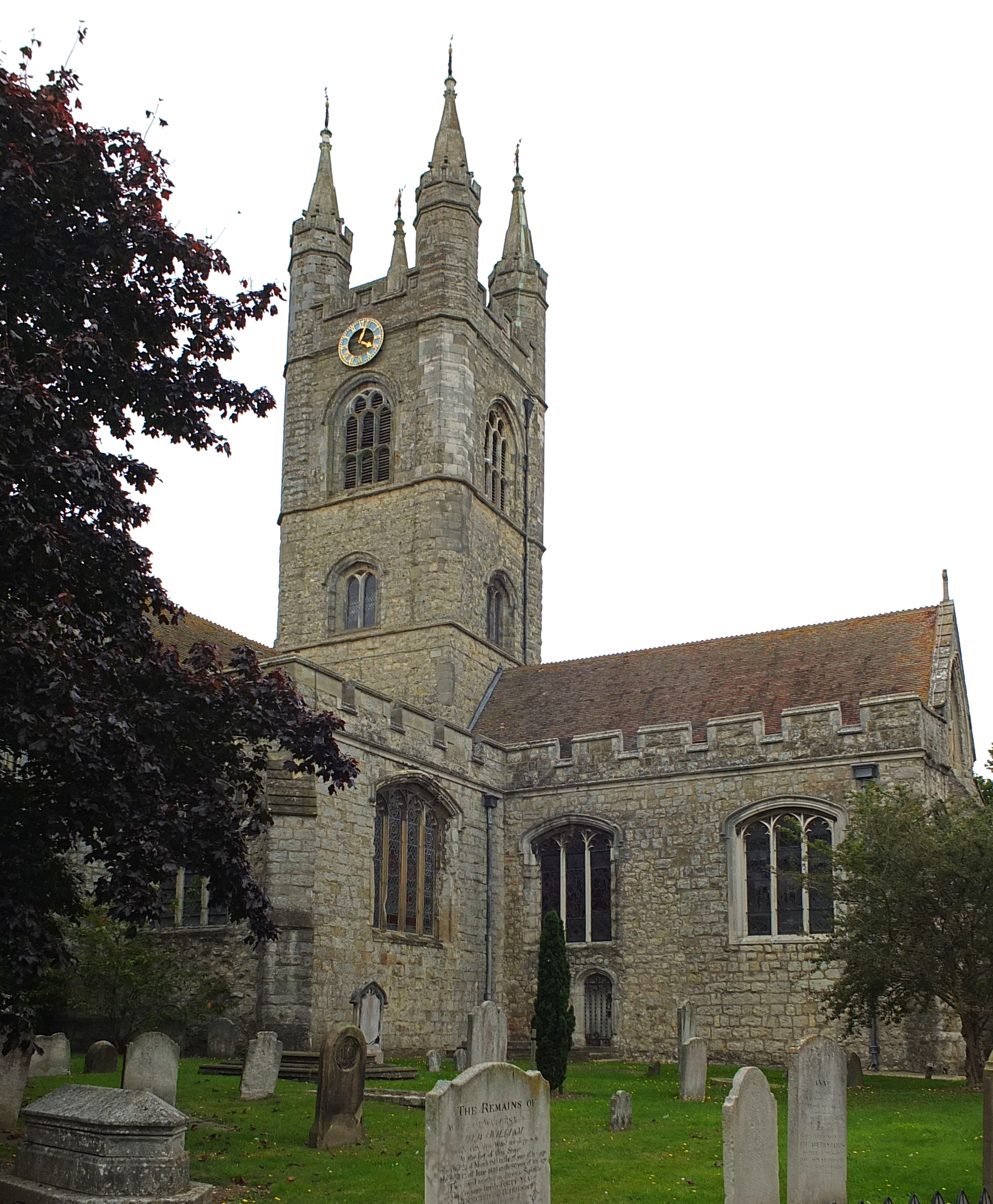
- The church in 2014
- St. Mary's Church
- 51°08′55″N 0°52′22″E
- OS grid reference: TR 01020 42744
- Location: Tufton Street; Ashford, Kent
- Country: England
- Website: Official website

Architecture
- Completed: late 13th century

St Mary's Parish Church, also known as the Church of St Mary the Virgin, in Ashford, Kent, England, dates to the late 13th century. It is a Grade I listed. There has been a church on the site since at least 1086, for one was mentioned in the Domesday Book.

Cranbrook native Comfort Starr, one of the founding members of Harvard College, was a warden at the church in the early 17th century.

== See also ==
- Listed buildings in Ashford, Kent
