= Percy Smythe, 8th Viscount Strangford =

The Right Honourable The Viscount Strangford
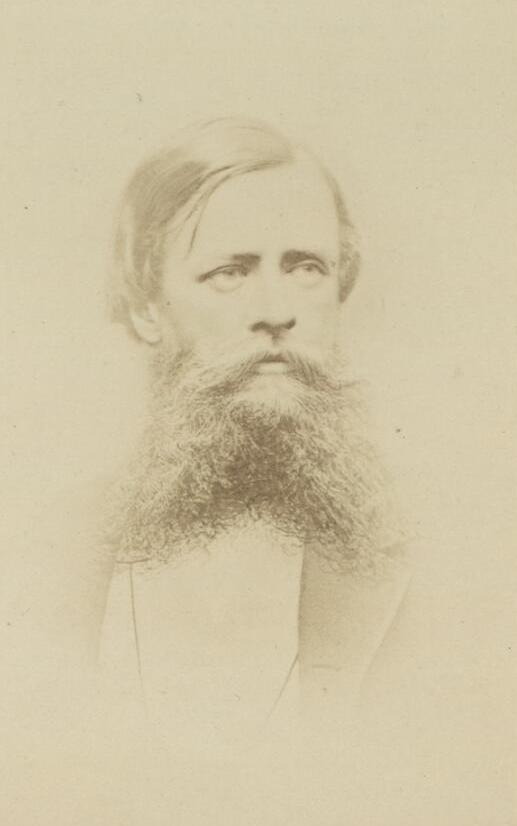
- Born: Percy Ellen Algernon Frederick William Sydney Smythe; 26 November 1825; St Petersburg, Russia
- Died: 9 January 1869 (aged 43)
- Education: Harrow School
- Alma mater: Merton College
- Spouse: Emily Anne Beaufort (m. 1862)
- Relatives: 7th Viscount Strangford (brother); Lionel Percy Smythe (half-brother); Sir John Burke (uncle)

Percy Ellen Algernon Frederick William Sydney Smythe, 8th Viscount Strangford (26 November 1825 – 9 January 1869) was a British nobleman and man of letters.

== Early life ==
He was born in St Petersburg, Russia, the son of the 6th Viscount Strangford, the British Ambassador, Ottoman Turkey, Sweden, and Portugal. During all his earlier years, Percy Smythe was nearly blind, in consequence, it was believed, of his mother having suffered hardship on a journey up the Baltic Sea in wintry weather shortly before his birth.

His education began at Harrow School, whence he went to Merton College, Oxford. He excelled as a linguist, and was nominated by the vice-chancellor of Oxford in 1845 as a student-attache at Constantinople.

== Career ==
While at Constantinople, where he served under Lord Stratford de Redcliffe, Smythe gained a mastery not only of Turkish and its dialects, but of the forms of modern Greek. He already had a good knowledge both of Persian and Arabic before going east. It was the study of Ottoman history that led him to the languages of the Balkan Peninsula.

On succeeding his brother as Viscount Strangford in 1857 he continued to live in Constantinople, immersed in cultural studies. At length, however, he returned to England and wrote a good deal, sometimes in the Saturday Review, sometimes in the Quarterly Review, and often in the Pall Mall Gazette. A rather severe review in the first of these, of the Egyptian Sepulchres and Syrian Shrines of Emily Anne Beaufort (1826–1887), led to the marriage of the reviewer and the author.

Lord Strangford wrote the final chapter, "Chaos", in his wife's book on the Eastern Shores of the Adriatic. It gained him a reputation with students of foreign politics.

Percy Smythe was president of the Royal Asiatic Society in 1861–64 and 1867–69.

== Personal life ==
In 1862, Smythe was married to the illustrator and writer, Emily Anne Beaufort (1826–1887), the daughter of Sir Francis Beaufort.

On his death in 1869 his titles became extinct. A Selection from the Writings of Viscount Strangford on Political, Geographical and Social Subjects was edited by his widow and published in 1869. His Original Letters and Papers upon Philology and Kindred Subjects were also edited by Lady Strangford (1878).

== Honours ==
The future national poet of Bulgaria, Ivan Vazov, eulogises his name and deeds in several of his poems written in 1876, following the April uprising and the Turkish atrocities in Rumelia, including one dedicated to his wife, Lady Strangford.

The Australian botanist, Ferdinand von Mueller named the species of flowering plant Goodenia strangfordii in his honour.

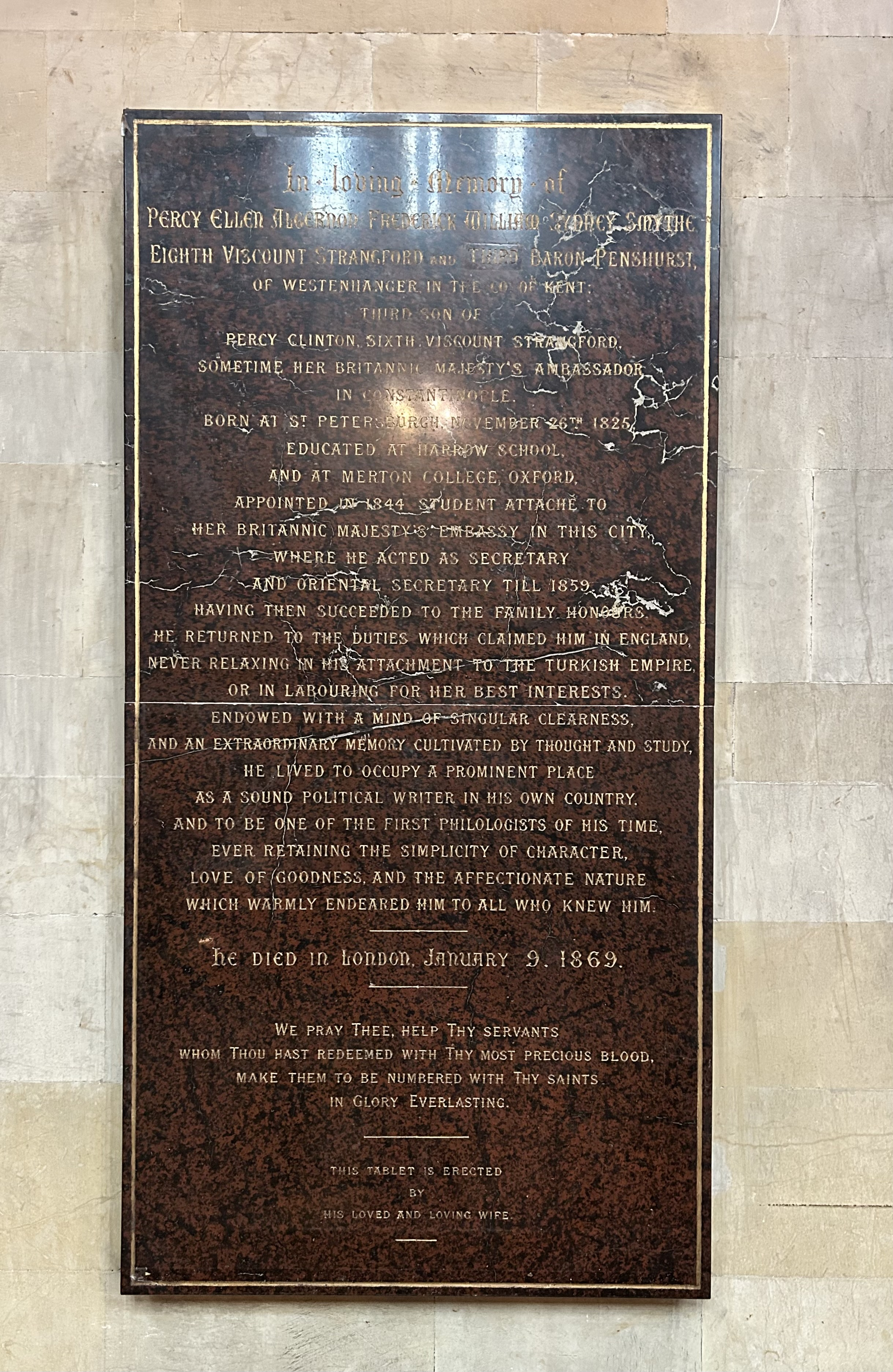
Memorial tablet to Percy Smythe, 8th Viscount Strangford at Crimea Memorial Church

There is a memorial tablet dedicated to him in Crimea Memorial Church erected by his wife which states that he was "...never relaxing in his attachment to the Turkish Empire or in labouring for her best interests. Endowed with a mind of singular clearness, and an extraordinary memory cultivated by thought and study, he lived to occupy a prominent place as a sound political writer in his own country, and to be one of the first philologists of his time,.."

Peerage of Ireland
Preceded by George Smythe	Viscount Strangford; 1857–1869	Extinct
