= Stanford, Kent =

Village in Kent, England

Coordinates: 51.103°N 1.0403°E

Stanford
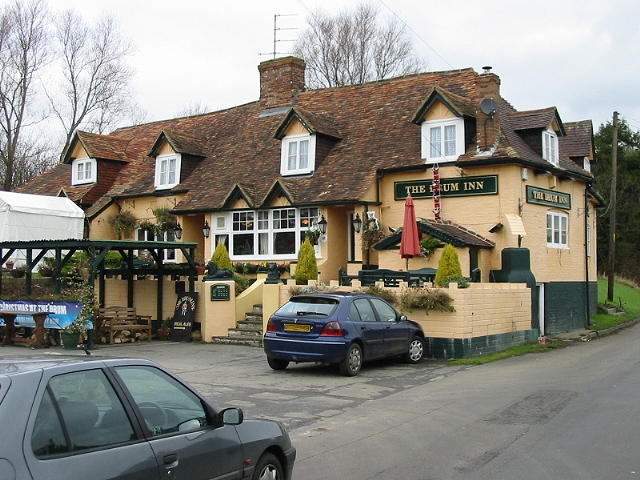
- The Drum Inn

- Location within Kent
- Population: 429 (2011)
- District: Folkestone and Hythe
- Shire county: Kent
- Region: South East
- Country: England
- Sovereign state: United Kingdom
- Post town: Ashford
- Postcode district: TN25
- Dialling code: 01303
- Police: Kent
- Fire: Kent
- Ambulance: South East Coast
- UK Parliament: Folkestone and Hythe

Stanford is a village and civil parish in Kent, England. It is part of the Folkestone and Hythe district.

The village developed along the ancient Roman Stone Street and was divided by the construction of the M20 motorway into Stanford North and Stanford South. Stanford Windmill and parish church of All Saints are in the village.

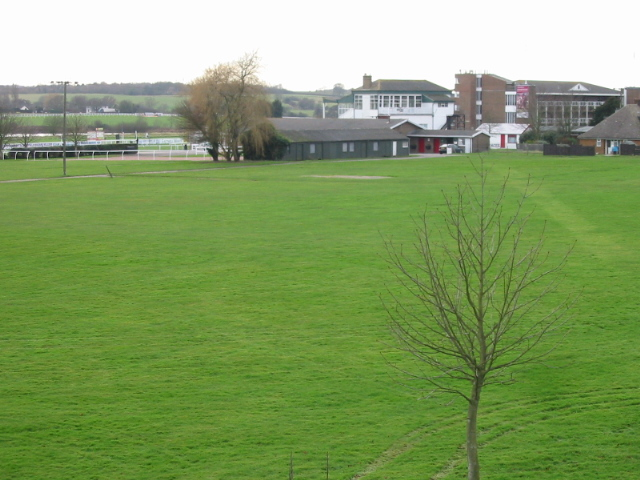

The parish includes the hamlet of Westenhanger. Folkestone Racecourse was located here; during World War II it served as the RAF Westenhanger airfield, and eventually closed for redevelopment in December 2012. Westenhanger Castle is adjacent to the racecourse. In 2023 the local authority granted planning permission for 8,500 homes at the Otterpool Park site which extends from Westenhanger station to the edges of Sellindge and Lympne.

== Transport ==
Westenhanger railway station serves the parish on the Ashford to Dover line. Trains run to Dover or London Charring Cross. Train services are run by Southeastern.

Local buses are run by Stagecoach South East.
