= Andrew Judde =

English merchant and Lord Mayor of London

The Right Honourable Sir Andrew Judde
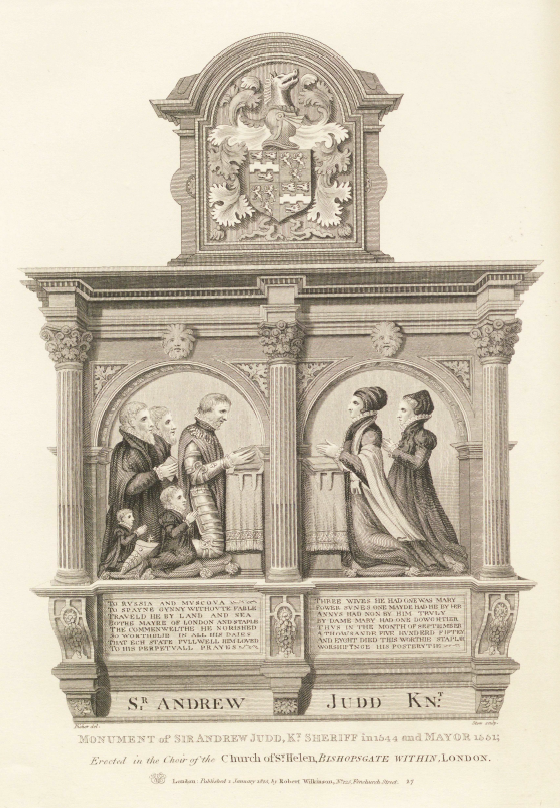
- Monument to Sir Andrew Judde in St Helen's Church, Bishopsgate

Lord Mayor of London
- In office 1550–1550
- Monarch: Edward VI
- Preceded by: Sir Rowland Hill
- Succeeded by: Sir Richard Dobbs

Sheriff of London
- In office 1544–1544
- Monarch: Henry VIII

Personal details
- Born: c. 1492 Tonbridge, Kent
- Died: 4 September 1558 (aged 66) London, UK
- Resting place: St Helen's, Bishopsgate, London, UK; 51.5148°N 0.0818°W
- Spouses: Mary Murfyn (m. 1523; died 1542) Agnes (Annys) (m. 1542) Mary Mathews (m. 1552)
- Children: with Mary Murfyn: John Judde; Richard Judde; Alice Judde; with Mary Mathews: Martha Judde

Sir Andrew Judde or Judd (c. 1492 – 4 September 1558) was a 16th-century English merchant and Lord Mayor of London. He was knighted on 15 February 1551.

== Biography ==
He was born before February, 1492, in Tonbridge, Kent, the third son of John Judde, (d. 1493), gentleman, and Margaret, daughter of Valentine Chiche. His mother was the granddaughter of an earlier Lord Mayor of London, Robert Chichele, and great-niece of Henry Chichele, Archbishop of Canterbury, and William Chichele, Sheriff of London. He left for London and apprenticed with the Skinners Company; he was later the master of the company for four terms. He accumulated a large fortune, part of which he used to establish Tonbridge School in his home town. During his career as a merchant, he personally travelled to Russia, Spain, and the coast of Africa.

After the dissolution of the property of the military order, the Knights of St John in England, their Battisford Preceptory was given to Judde by Henry VIII in July 1543. He soon gained permission to sell it on, the property passing to Sir Richard Gresham in April 1544.

He served as one of the Sheriffs of London in 1544, and was elected Lord Mayor of London in 1550. As a result of his vigorous opposition to Wyatt's Rebellion, he gained the favour of Queen Mary and Philip II of Spain. He served as Mayor of the Staple of Calais.

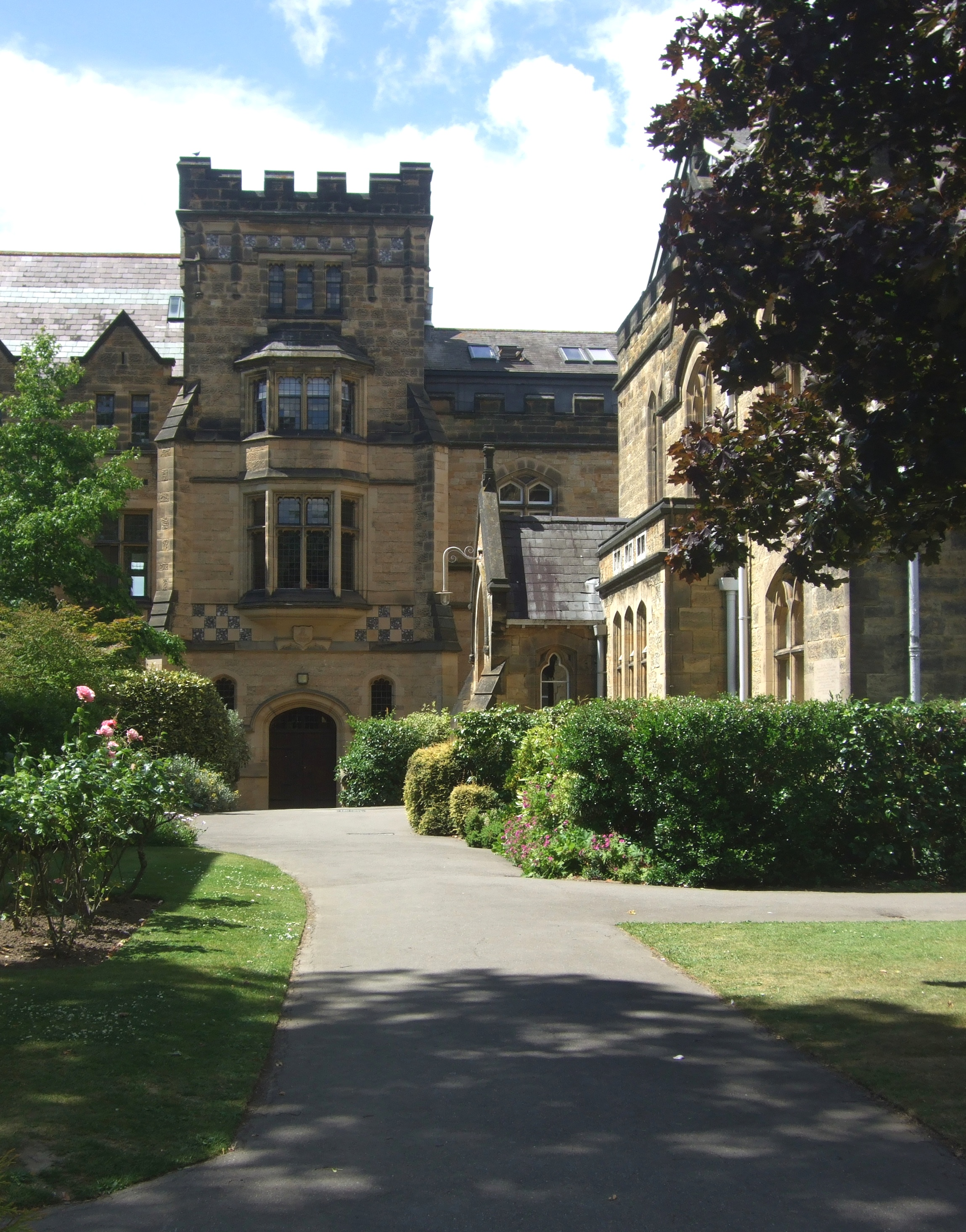
Tonbridge School, founded by Andrew Judde

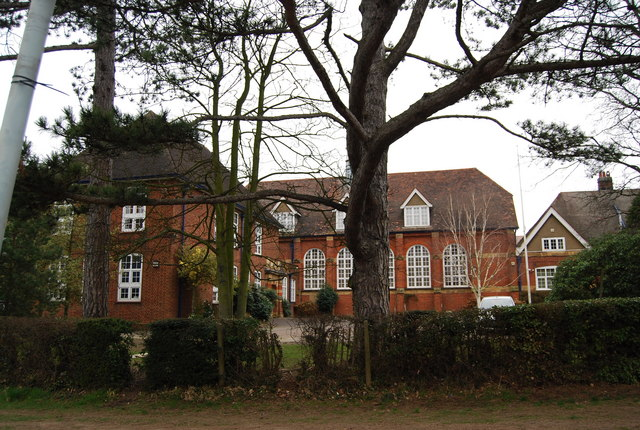
The Judd School, founded by the Skinners Company, is named after Andrew Judde

== Family ==
Sir Andrew Judde was married three times.

- He married first, by 1523, Mary (d. 1542), daughter of Thomas Murfyn (d. 1523), an earlier Lord Mayor of London, and his first wife, Alice Marshall. By her he had four sons, two of whom survived, and a daughter:
  - John Judde
  - Richard Judde
  - Alice Judde, who married Thomas Smythe (1522–1591), collector of customs for London.

(His first wife's half sister, Frances Murfyn (c. 1520–c. 1543), married, in 1534, Thomas Cromwell's nephew, Richard. Alice Squire (d. 1560), the widow of her brother, Edward Murfyn, married circa 1528, Edward North (later Baron North).)

- He married a second time, in 1542, to Agnes (Annys), about whom nothing is known.
- His third and final marriage was in 1552 to Mary (d. 1602), the wealthy widow of another skinner, Thomas Langton, and daughter of Thomas Mathews of Colchester. By his last wife, he had a daughter:
  - Martha Judde, who married Robert Golding in Essex. Her mother bequeathed to them the furniture of the Queen's Chamber at Latton, and silverware with the arms of Andrew Judde.

== Death ==
Judde died on 4 September 1558 and was buried in St Helen's, Bishopsgate, London.

== Bibliography ==
- Beaven, Alfred B. (1913). The Aldermen of the City of London. Vol. II. London: Corporation of the City of London.
- Cox, John Edmund (1876). The Annals of St. Helen's, Bishopsgate, London. London: Tinsley Brothers.
- Drake, William R. (1873). "Appendix I". Fasciculus Mervinensis, Being Notes Historical, Genealogical, and Heraldic of the Family of Mervyn. London: Privately printed. pp. vi–viii.
- Emmison, F. G. (1978). Elizabethan Life: Wills of Essex Gentry and Merchants Proved in the Prerogative Court of Canterbury. Essex Record Office publications. No. 71. Chelmsford: Essex County Council. ISBN 9780900360503. OCLC 4993654.
- Hawkyard, A. D. K. (1982). "North, Edward (c.1504-64), of Kirtling, Cambs., the Charterhouse, Mdx. and London". In Bindoff, S.T. (ed.). The History of Parliament: the House of Commons 1509-1558. Boydell and Brewer.
- Hofmann, T.M. (1982). "Cromwell, alias Williams, Richard (by 1512-44), of London; Stepney, Mdx. and Hinchingbroke, Hunts.". In Bindoff, S.T. (ed.). The History of Parliament: the House of Commons 1509-1558. Boydell and Brewer.
- Lambarde, Fane (1931). "Sir Andrew Judde" (PDF). Archaeologia Cantiana. 43. Kent Archaeological Society: 99–102.
- Machyn, Henry (1848). Nichols, John Gough (ed.). The Diary of Henry Machyn, Citizen and Merchant–Taylor of London, from A. D. 1550 to A. D. 1563. [Camden Society. Publications]. Vol. XLII. London, UK: Camden Society by J.B. Nichols and Son.
- Page, William, ed. (1975). "House of Knights Hospitaller: Preceptory of Battisford". A History of the County of Suffolk. Vol. 2. London: Victoria County History. pp. 120–121 – via British History Online.
- Slack, Paul (January 2008). "Judde, Sir Andrew". Oxford Dictionary of National Biography (online ed.). Oxford University Press. doi:10.1093/ref:odnb/37622. (Subscription, Wikipedia Library access or UK public library membership required.)
- Vere-Hodge, H. S. (1953). Sir Andrew Judde, Lord Mayor of London 1550-1551, Mayor of the Staple of Calais, Six Times Master of the Skinners Company, Founder of Tonbridge School 1553. Tonbridge School Shop.
- Wadmore, J. F. (1881). "Some Account of the History and Antiquities of the Worshipful Company of Skinners, London". Transactions of the London and Middlesex Archaeological Society. 5. London: J. H. & J. Parker: 92−182.
- Wriothesley, Charles (1875). Hamilton, William Douglas (ed.). A Chronicle Of England During The Reigns Of The Tudors: From A.D. 1485 To 1559 I. Vol. XI. London, UK: Camden Society.
