= St Thomas of Canterbury Church, Canterbury =

Coordinates: 51.278339°N 1.083128°E

St Thomas' Church
- St Thomas of Canterbury Church
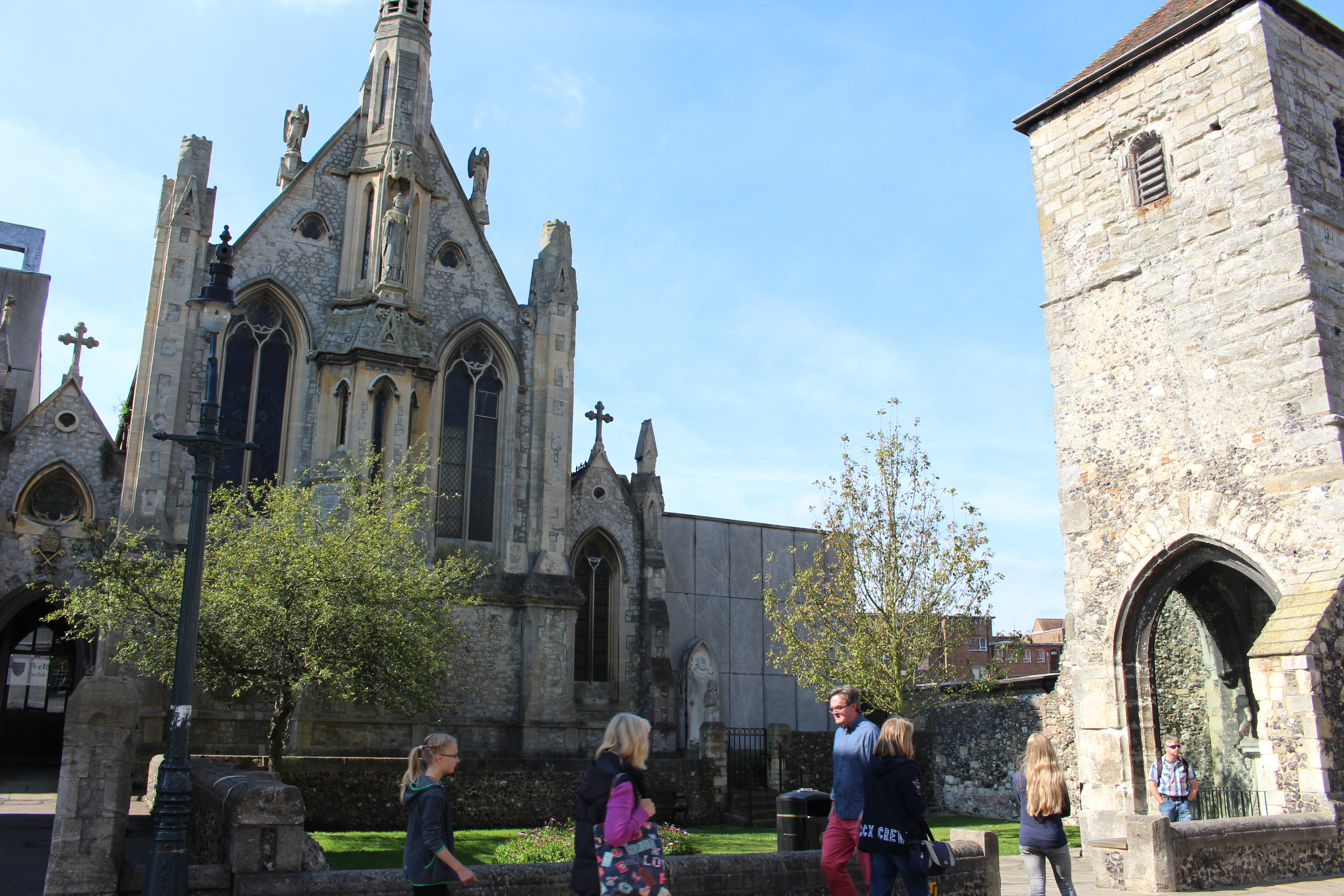
- North side of church

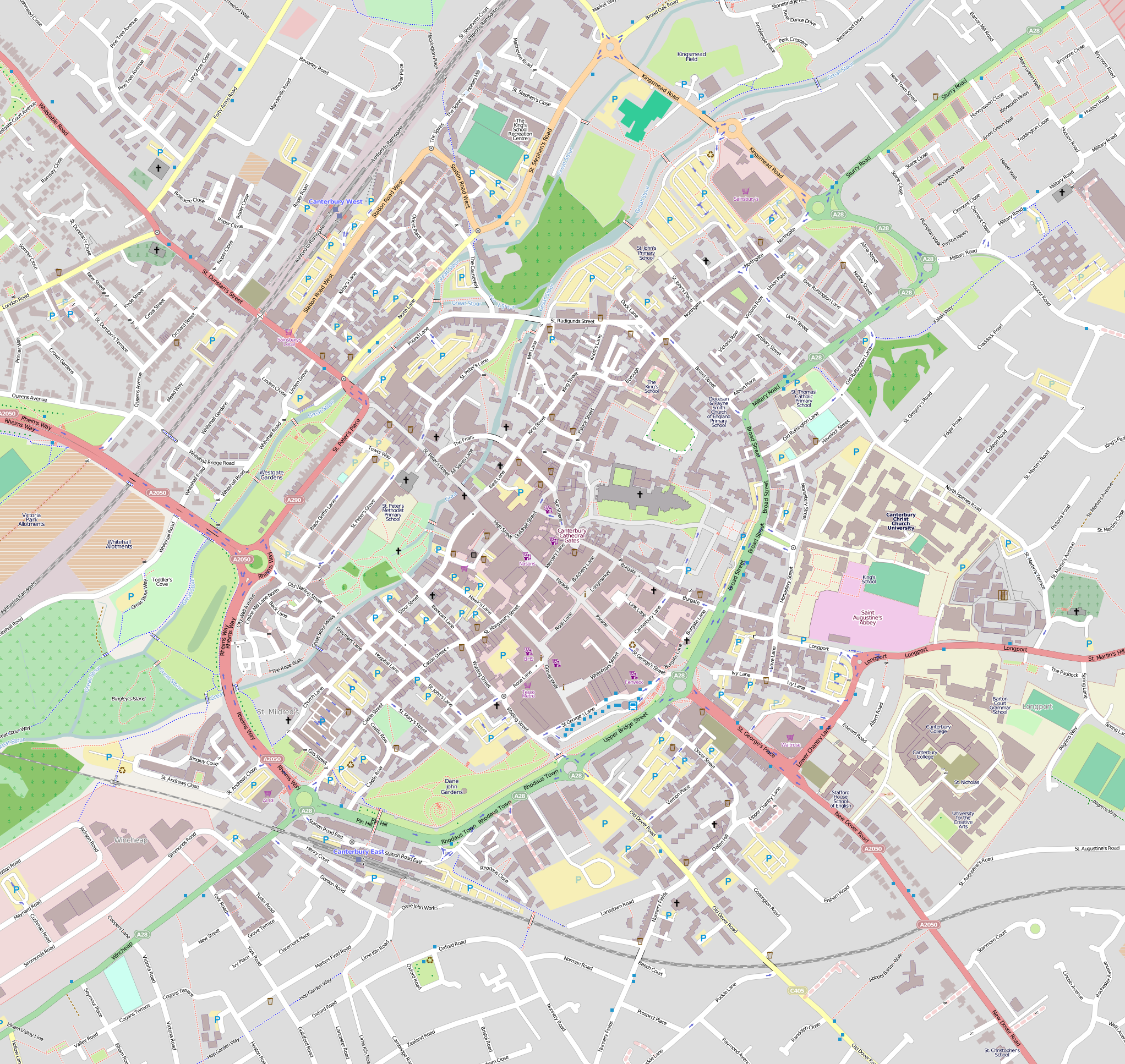
- Location in Canterbury
- OS grid reference: TR 15123 57758
- Location: Canterbury, Kent
- Country: England
- Denomination: Roman Catholic
- Website: StThomasofCanterbury.com

History
- Status: Parish church
- Founded: 1859
- Dedication: Thomas Becket

Architecture
- Functional status: Active
- Architect: John Green Hall
- Style: Gothic Revival
- Years built: 1874 to 1875

Administration
- Province: Southwark
- Diocese: Southwark
- Deanery: Canterbury

St Thomas of Canterbury Church is a Roman Catholic Parish church in Canterbury, Kent, England. It was built from 1874 to 1875 in the Gothic Revival style. It is situated on the corner of Burgate and Canterbury Lane, west of Lower Bridge Street, opposite the grounds of Canterbury Cathedral in the centre of the city. It is the only Roman Catholic church in Canterbury, built on the site of a medieval church (demolished in 1870); the old St Mary Magdalen’s Tower was retained. The church contains relics of Thomas Becket.

== History ==
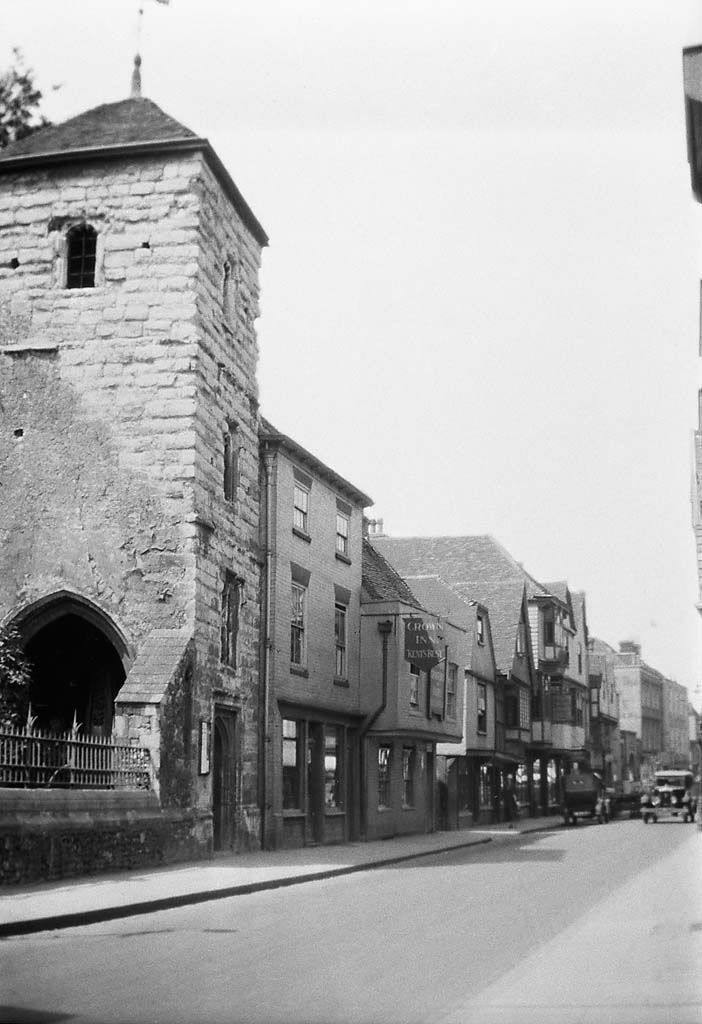
St Mary Magdalene chapel, demolished in 1871 to make space for the church

=== Origin ===
After the English Reformation, the Catholic community in Canterbury survived through the Hales baronets. Sir Thomas Hales, 2nd Baronet helped Catholics after the 1688 Revolution. They had Masses said for them at their chapel in Hales Place. Masses were said at the chapel until 1923. It was then sold by the Jesuits in 1928.

=== Foundation ===
In 1859, a mission was started in the city. It was founded when a Mary Ann Wood gave 59 Burgate Street, the current presbytery, for the use of a Catholic priest. The land around the house was later purchased for the construction of a church and school. The land included a medieval chapel dedicated to St Mary Magdalene. In 1871, the chapel was demolished, but its tower remains standing.

=== Construction ===
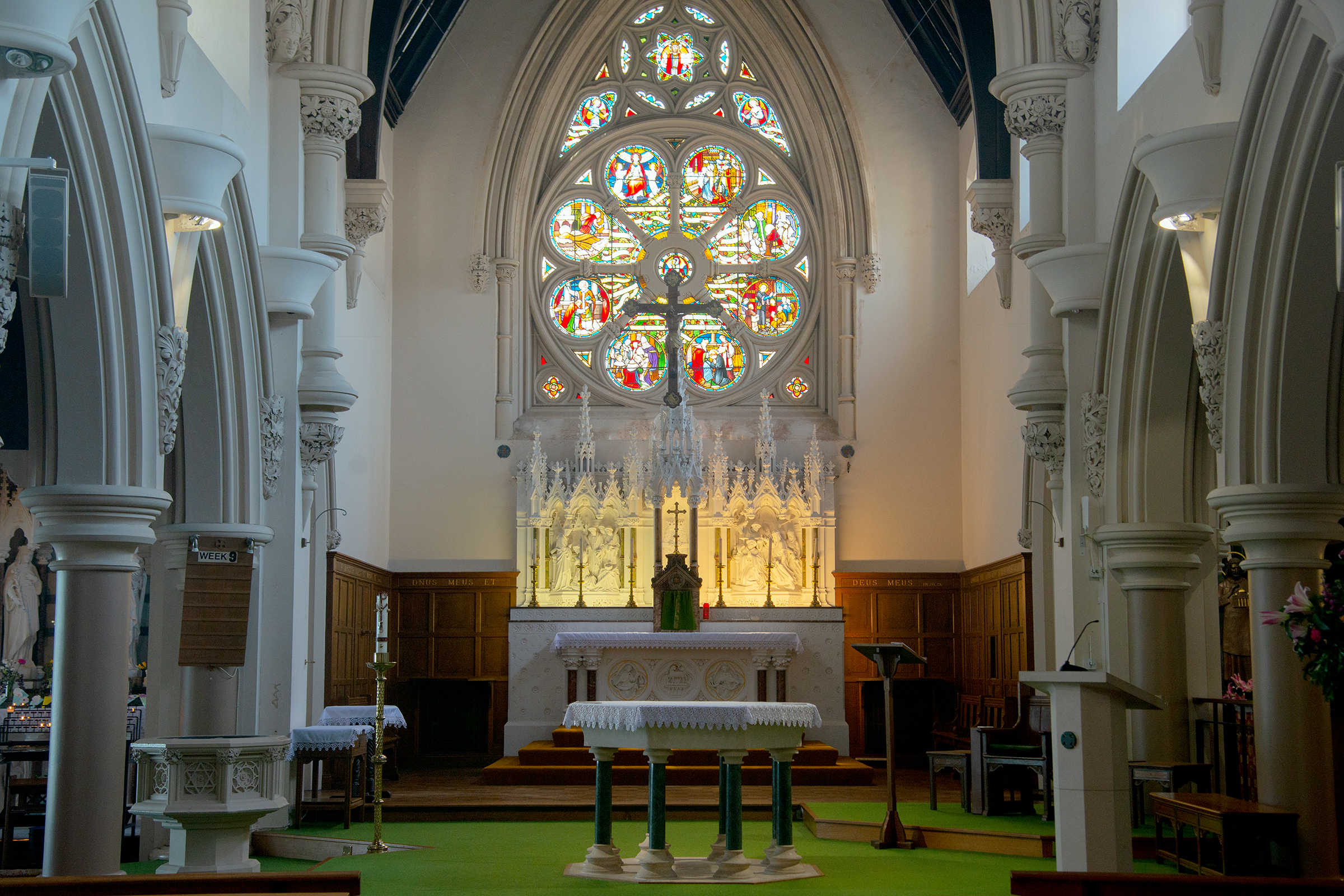
St. Thomas of Canterbury church, interior

In 1874, building work on the Gothic architecture style church started. It was designed by John Green Hall, a local architect. The design of the church was influenced by E. W. Pugin who died in 1875 and worked at Hales Place in the 1860s. The high altar and Lady Chapel altar were designed by A. E. Purdie. On 13 April 1875, the church was opened. The preaching at the Mass was done by the Archbishop of Westminster, Cardinal Henry Manning.

Significant structural changes to the interior were made in 1962/63. In the current era, a double rose stained-glass window under a Gothic arch is located above the altar. Major modifications to the interior were completed in the 1980s, including the installation of a new octagonal altar of limestone with marble pillars. (The high altar remains in place.) A Baptismal font made in 1865 by George Horan was added in the sanctuary.

Beside the sanctuary is the Lady Chapel with pieta, a sculpture of St. Constance and of St George, and an altar donated in 1905.

The Martyrs’ Chapel contains the shrine with the relics of St Thomas of Canterbury. According to the church's web site, the "pedigree of the relics is well authenticated".

An extension to the church added in 1963 contains the Canterbury Saints Chapel with a mural, The Canterbury Saints created by Helen Grunwald.

The organ loft at the west end contains a two manual and pedal organ, rebuilt in 1990.

=== Developments ===
In June 1942, the buildings around church were damaged in The Blitz. In 1953, relics and the Stations of the Cross were donated to the church. They had previously come from Westminster Cathedral. They were donated by Cardinal Bernard Griffin after the Eric Gill stations of the cross were installed in the cathedral. In the early 1960s, when the parish priest was Canon de Laubenque, extensions and reordering were done to the church. The north side of the church was extended with a modern flat-roofed two storeys high, structure. A Martyrs Chapel was built on the south side. It contains the relics of St Thomas of Canterbury. In 1989, the sanctuary was re-ordered. The architect was Richard Fulbrook. In 1997, a mosaic was installed in the north aisle. It depicts St Augustine of Canterbury.

=== Relics ===
In the Martyrs Chapel in the church there is a reliquary over the altar. It contains a piece of Becket’s vestment and a piece of a bone from his body. In the late 19th century, these were given to the church by Mary Hales, of the Hales baronets. The relics came from Gubbio in Umbria, where, since the 1220s, they had been held. In 1953, the Prior of Chevetogne Abbey, called Fr Thomas Becquet, a descendant of family of the martyr, gave a piece of Becket’s finger to the church. Either side of the reliquary are statues of St John Fisher and St Thomas More. The chapel has a stained glass window showing the martyrdom of St Thomas Becket, St Gregory the Great and St Augustine of Canterbury.

There is a reliquary set into the wall to the left of the windows. It contains parts of the Mass vestments of Óscar Romero, Archbishop of San Salvador. In 1997, these were given to the church. On west wall of the Martyrs' Chapel is a statue of St John Stone.

== Parish ==
Masses are held every weekday at Noon; on Saturdays at Noon and 6pm and on Sundays at 8am, 9:30am, 11am & 6pm.

== See also ==
- Roman Catholic Archdiocese of Southwark
