= Alastair Campbell, 4th Baron Colgrain =

British hereditary peer

The Right Honourable The Lord Colgrain DL
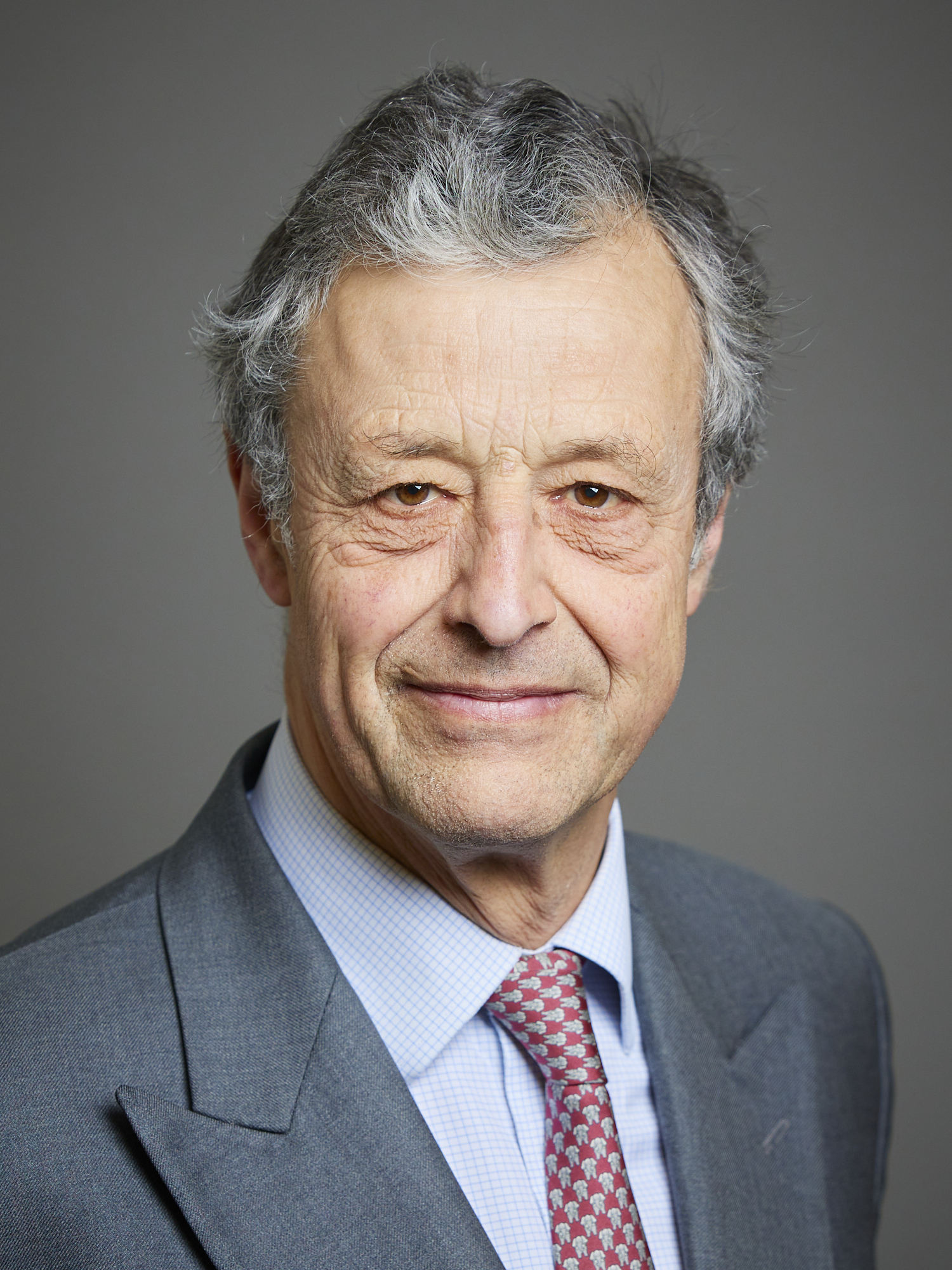
- Official parliamentary portrait, 2023

Member of the House of Lords
- Lord Temporal
- Elected Hereditary Peer; 27 March 2017 – 29 April 2026
- By-election: 2017
- Preceded by: The 3rd Baron Lyell
- Succeeded by: Seat abolished

Personal details
- Born: Alastair Colin Leckie Campbell; 16 September 1951 (age 75) Sevenoaks, Kent, England
- Party: Conservative
- Spouse: Annabel Warrender (m. 1979)
- Education: Eton College
- Alma mater: Trinity College, Cambridge

Alastair Colin Leckie Campbell, 4th Baron Colgrain, DL (born 16 September 1951), is a British hereditary peer and former Conservative member of the House of Lords.

After attending Eton College, he went up to read English at Trinity College, Cambridge, graduating as MA. Starting his career in the City with J Henry Schroder Wagg, he joined the Welbeck Group as a financial services headhunter in 1985. Taken over by the Whitney Group 1991, he was promoted Managing Director, CEO becoming its Vice-President (Europe) in 1999. Since 2008, he has been a partner running the Campbell family estate in the Weald of Kent and served as High Sheriff of Kent for 2013/14, before being appointed a Deputy Lieutenant for Kent in 2017.

Lord Colgrain was elected to sit in the Upper House at a whole House by-election in March 2017, in place of Lord Lyell who died on 11 January 2017.

== Family ==
Descended from a cadet branch of the Campbells, Earls of Breadalbane, his great-grandfather, the Scottish banker Colin Campbell, was created Baron Colgrain in 1946. He succeeded to the family title upon his father's death in 2008.

In 1979 he married, Annabel Rose, younger daughter of the Hon. Robin Warrender. Lord and Lady Colgrain have two sons:

- Hon. Thomas David Colin Campbell (born 1984), married 2016 Jessica Cator, having:
  - Charles Victor Swinton Campbell (born 2020);
- Hon. Nicholas Robin Campbell (born 1986), married 2022 Kelly Frye.

His wife, the Lady Colgrain, serves as Lord Lieutenant of Kent since 2020.

== See also ==
- Baron Colgrain
- Clan Campbell

Coat of arms of Alastair Campbell, 4th Baron Colgrain
Crest A Boar’s Head erect and erased Azure issuing from a Wreath of Myrtle leaved and flowered Proper. Escutcheon Gyronny of eight Or and Sable on a chief Azure a Bezant between two Crescents of the First. Supporters On the dexter side a Horse Argent and on the sinister side a Boar Azure. Motto Fac Et Spera

Peerage of the United Kingdom
Preceded by David Campbell; 3rd Baron	Baron Colgrain; 2008–present	Incumbent
Parliament of the United Kingdom
Preceded by The Lord Lyell	Elected hereditary peer to the House of Lords under the House of Lords Act 1999; 2017–2026	Position abolished under the House of Lords (Hereditary Peers) Act 2026
