= Lewis Watson, 1st Earl of Rockingham =

English peer and politician (1655–1724)

Lewis Watson
- Earl of Rockingham
- Coat of arms
- Reign: William III; Anne; George I
- Successor: Lewis Watson, 2nd Earl of Rockingham
- Other titles: Viscount Sondes; Baron Throwley; Baron Rockingham; Baronet of Rockingham Castle
- Born: 29 December 1655; Rockingham Castle, Northamptonshire, England
- Died: 19 March 1724 (aged 68); Rockingham Castle, Northamptonshire, England
- Buried: 1 April 1724; Leonard's Church, Rockingham
- Family: Watson
- Spouse: Lady Catherine Sondes (d. 1696)
- Issue: Edward Watson, Viscount Sondes; George Watson; Margaret Watson; Mary Watson; Arabella Watson
- Father: Edward Watson, 2nd Baron Rockingham
- Mother: Anne Wentworth
- Occupation: Politician

Lewis Watson, 1st Earl of Rockingham (29 December 1655 – 19 March 1724) was an English peer and politician. He was the eldest son of Edward Watson, 2nd Baron Rockingham (1630 – 1689) and Anne Wentworth, daughter of Thomas Wentworth, 1st Earl of Strafford.

In 1681–1685, Watson was Whig Member of Parliament for Canterbury and for Higham Ferrers briefly in 1689, before having to leave the Commons on inheriting his father's barony that year.

Lord Rockingham was Master of the Buckhounds in 1703–1705, Custos Rotulorum and Lord Lieutenant of Kent in 1705–1724, Vice-Admiral of Kent in 1705 and Deputy Warden of the Cinque Ports in 1705–1708. In 1714, he was created Earl of Rockingham.

In July 1677, he married Lady Catherine Sondes (d. 1696), a daughter of George Sondes, 1st Earl of Feversham. They had five surviving children:

- Edward, styled Viscount Sondes (c. 1687 – Kensington, 20 March 1722), married on 21 March 1708 Lady Catherine Tufton (24 April 1693 – 13 February 1733), daughter of Thomas Tufton, 6th Earl of Thanet and Lady Catherine Cavendish, parents of the 2nd and 3rd Earls of Rockingham and Catherine Watson (d. April 1765), who married Edward Southwell and had Edward Southwell, 20th Baron de Clifford.
- Hon. George (24 May 1689 – 1735)
- Lady Margaret (1695–1751), married John Monson, 1st Baron Monson.
- Lady Mary (d. 1737), married Wray Saunderson.
- Lady Arabella, married Sir Robert Furnese, 2nd Baronet.
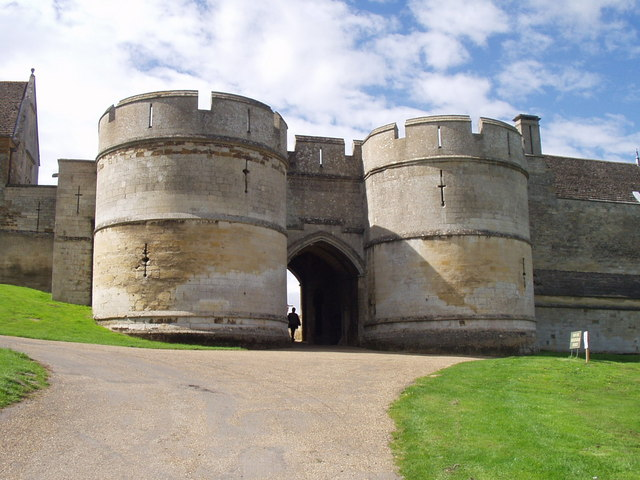
Rockingham Castle, Northamptonshire, seat of the Watson family

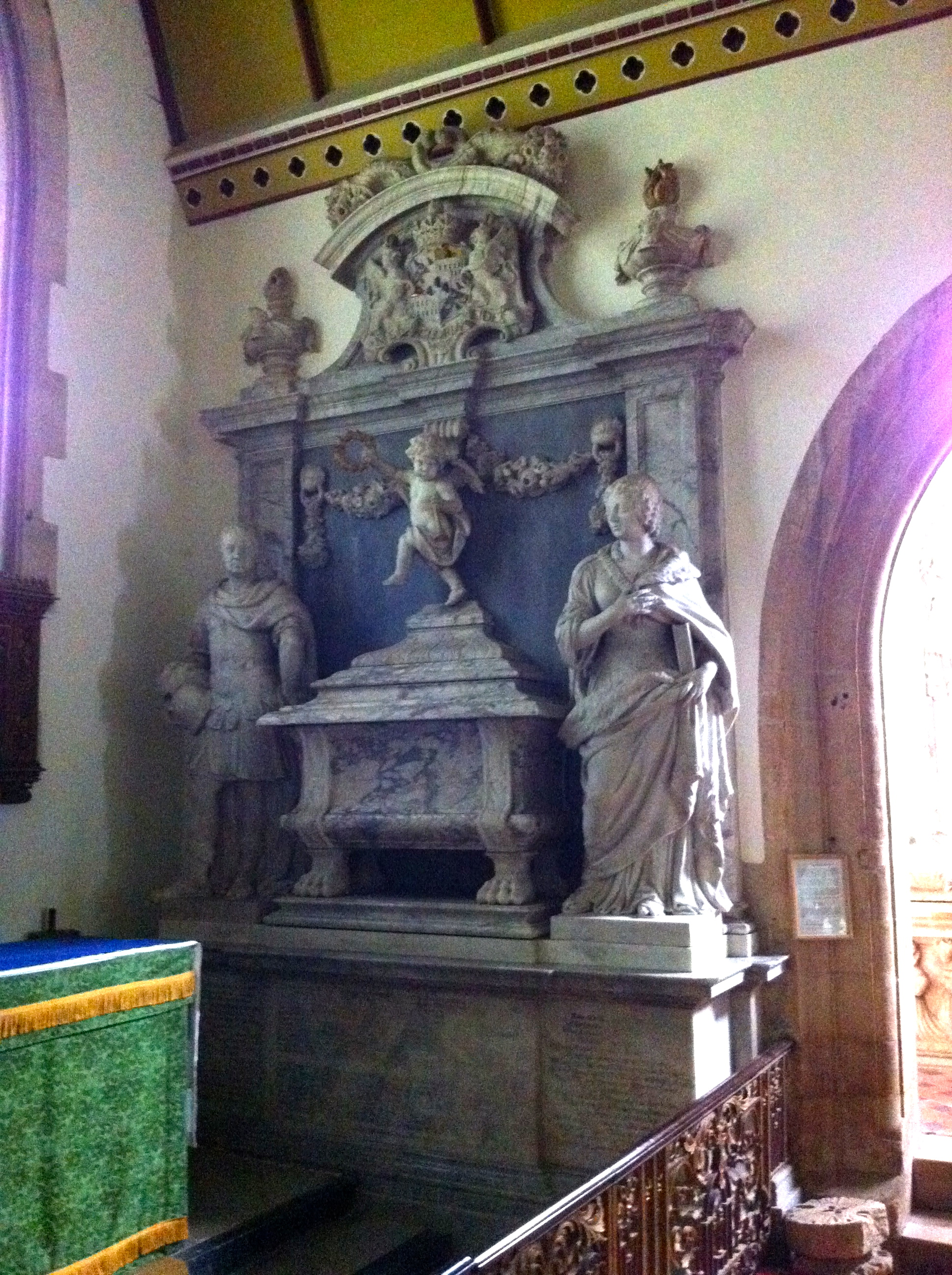
Memorial to Lewis Watson, 1st Earl of Rockingham (d.1724) in St. Leonard's Church, Rockingham

His wife died on 21 March 1696 and was buried at Rockingham. He died on 19 march 1724 and was buried 1 April at Rockingham. He was succeeded by his grandson, Lewis.

== Sources ==
- Cokayne, G. E. (1949). White, Geoffrey H. (ed.). The Complete Peerage, or a History of the House of Lords and all its Members from the Earliest Times. Vol. 11. London: St Catherine Press. pp. 56–62.
- Hasted, Edward (1798). "Parishes". The History and Topographical Survey of the County of Kent. Vol. 7. British History Online.
- Henning, Basil Duke (1983). "Watson, Hon. Lewis (1655-1724), of Rockingham Castle, Northants". In Henning, Basil Duke (ed.). The History of Parliament: the House of Commons 1660-1690. Archived from the original on 22 December 2022 – via History of Parliament Online.
- Wise, Charles (1891). Rockingham Castle and the Watsons. London: Elliot Stock. OCLC 902976023.

Parliament of England
Preceded by Edward Hales; Sir Thomas Hardres	Member of Parliament for Canterbury; 1681–1685; With: Vincent Denne	Succeeded by Sir William Honywood, Bt; Henry Lee
Preceded by Sir Rice Rudd, Bt	Member of Parliament for Higham Ferrers; 1689	Succeeded by Thomas Andrew
Honorary titles
Preceded by The Earl of Winchilsea	Lord Lieutenant of Kent; 1705–1724	Succeeded by The Earl of Leicester
Preceded by The Earl of Winchilsea	Custos Rotulorum and Vice-Admiral of Kent; 1705–1724	Succeeded by The Duke of Dorset
Peerage of Great Britain
New creation	Earl of Rockingham; 1714–1724	Succeeded by Lewis Watson
Peerage of England
Preceded by Edward Watson	Baron Rockingham; 1689–1724	Succeeded by Lewis Watson
