= Annabel Campbell, Baroness Colgrain =

British aristocrat (born 1956)

The Right Honourable The Lady Colgrain CStJ

Lord Lieutenant of Kent
- Incumbent
- Assumed office 22 April 2020
- Monarchs: Elizabeth II; Charles III
- Preceded by: The 2nd Viscount De L'Isle

Personal details
- Born: Annabel Rose Warrender; 17 January 1956 (age 70) Oxfordshire, England
- Spouse: Alastair Campbell, 4th Baron Colgrain (m. 1979)
- Children: 2 sons

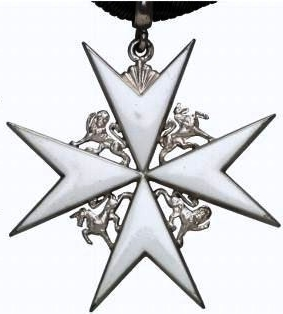
CStJ insignia

Annabel Rose Campbell, Baroness Colgrain, CStJ (née Warrender; born 17 January 1956), styled the Lady Colgrain from 2008, is a British aristocrat. She has served as Lord Lieutenant of Kent since 2020.

== Life ==
Born in 1956, she is the younger daughter of the Hon. Robin Hugh Warrender (and Gillian née Rossiter, only daughter of Leonard Lewis Rossiter by his wife Elsie Oppenheimer, daughter of Sir Bernard Oppenheimer, 1st Baronet), son of Victor Warrender, 1st Baron Bruntisfield. Brought up at Fulbrook, Oxfordshire, she started her career in publishing, before working in the voluntary sector, primarily with Citizens Advice.

A Trustee of the Henry Smith Charity having been its Kent Visitor since 2007, she chaired the Kent Community Foundation until 2017 and is a Patron and supporter of many Kent charities.

Lady Colgrain served as a Deputy Lieutenant for Kent since 2012, before being appointed Lord Lieutenant in 2020.

On 14 July 1979 she married the Hon. Alastair Campbell, who succeeded as the 4th Baron Colgrain upon the death of his father in 2008.

Lord and Lady Colgrain live near Sevenoaks in Kent and have two sons:

1. First son: Hon. Thomas Colin David Campbell (born 9 February 1984), married 2016 Jessica Clare Cator (born 1989), daughter of Charles Francis Cator, of Luckington, Wiltshire, whose mother was the Hon. Jacquetta Storey, only daughter of the Baron Buckton, and has issue;
2. Second son: Hon. Nicholas Robin Campbell (born 12 December 1986), married 2022 Kelly Frye (born 1984), only daughter of Michael Joseph Frye, of Houston, Texas, United States.

On 10 November 2025, she awarded actor Tom Baker an MBE on behalf of King Charles III.

== Honours ==
- Commander, Order of St John of Jerusalem (2022)

Honorary titles
Preceded by The Viscount De L'Isle	Lord Lieutenant of Kent; 2020–	Incumbent
