= Vincent Denne =

Member of Parliament

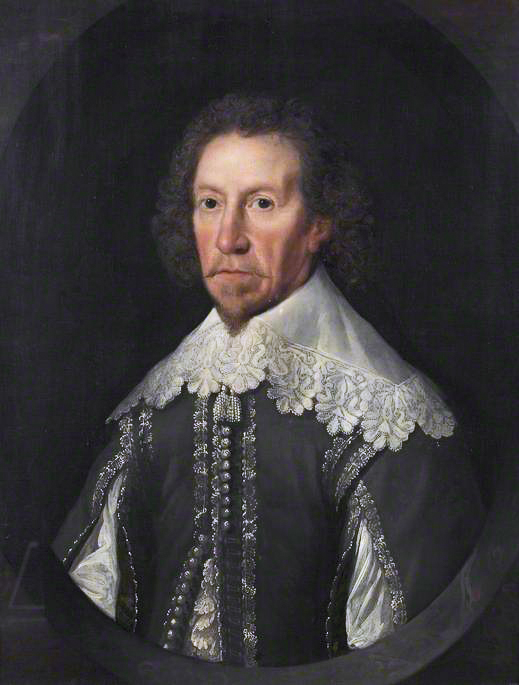
- Vincent Denne in 1640

Member of the British Parliament for Canterbury
- In office 1861–85
- Preceded by: Sir Edward Hales, Bt; Thomas Hardres
- Succeeded by: Sir William Honywood, Bt; Henry Lee

Personal details
- Born: c. 1628
- Died: October 1693 (aged 64–65)

Vincent Denne (c. 1628 – October 1693) was an English politician who sat in the House of Commons in 1654 and from 1681 to 1685.

Denne was the son of Thomas Denne, of Canterbury and his wife Susan Honeywood, daughter of Arthur Honeywood of Lenham. He became a sergeant-at-law.

In 1656, Denne was elected Member of Parliament (MP) for Canterbury in the Second Protectorate Parliament. After the Restoration, he was again MP for Canterbury from 1681 to 1685.

Denne died in 1693 possessed of Denne Hill.

Denn married Mary Denne of Denne Hill and had four daughters.

Parliament of England
Preceded by Thomas Scot; Francis Butcher	Member of Parliament for Canterbury; 1656; With: Thomas St Nicholas	Succeeded by Thomas St Nicholas; Robert Gibbon
Preceded by Sir Edward Hales, Bt; Thomas Hardres	Member of Parliament for Canterbury; 1681–1685; With: Lewis Watson	Succeeded by Sir William Honywood, Bt; Henry Lee
