= Lewis Watson, 2nd Earl of Rockingham =

British peer

Lewis Watson
- Earl of Rockingham
- Coat of arms
- Reign: George II
- Predecessor: Lewis Watson, 1st Earl of Rockingham
- Successor: Thomas Watson, 3rd Earl of Rockingham
- Other titles: Viscount Sondes; Baron Throwley; Baron Rockingham
- Born: c. 1714
- Died: 4 December 1745 (aged 30–31)
- Buried: 14 December 1745; Rockingham church
- Noble family: Watson
- Spouse: Catherine Furnese
- Father: Edward Watson, Viscount Sondes
- Mother: Catherine Tufton
- Occupation: politician

Lewis Watson, 2nd Earl of Rockingham (c. 1714 – 4 December 1745) was a British peer, styled Viscount Sondes from 1722 to 1724.

He was born the eldest son of Edward Watson, Viscount Sondes and Lady Catherine Tufton, the daughter of Thomas Tufton, 6th Earl of Thanet and Lady Catherine Cavendish.

His father having predeceased his own father, Lewis inherited the earldom from his grandfather, Lewis Watson, 1st Earl of Rockingham, in 1724. He was Lord Lieutenant of Kent from 1737 to his death in 1745.

He married his first cousin Catherine, daughter of Sir Robert Furnese. As part of the marriage settlement, he purchased a London house in Grosvenor Square and had it grandly decorated with marble tables, Persian carpets, mahogany panelling, silk damask hangings, and an organ.

Watson died childless on 4 December and was buried on 14 December 1745 at Rockingham. He was succeeded by his brother, Thomas. His widow subsequently married, on 13 June 1751, as his third wife, Francis, Earl of Guildford, who died on 4 August 1790. She died on 17 December 1766 and was buried at Wroxton.

== Sources ==
- Cokayne, G. E. (1949). White, Geoffrey H. (ed.). The Complete Peerage, or a History of the House of Lords and all its Members from the Earliest Times. Vol. 11. London: St Catherine Press. pp. 57–58.
- Hasted, Edward (1798) [1st pub. Canterbury: W Bristow:1798]. "Parishes: Ospringe". The History and Topographical Survey of the County of Kent. Vol. 6. British History Online. pp. 499–531.
- Newman, A. N. (1970). "Watson, Hon. Thomas (1715-46)". In Sedgwick, Romney (ed.). The History of Parliament: the House of Commons 1715-1754. History of Parliament.
- Sheppard, F. H. W., ed. (1980) [1st pub. London: London County Council:1980]. "Grosvenor Square: Individual Houses Built before 1926". Survey of London. Vol. 40: The Grosvenor Estate in Mayfair, Part 2 (Buildings). British History Online. pp. 117–166.
- Wise, Charles (1891). Rockingham Castle and the Watsons. London: Elliot Stock. OCLC 902976023.

Honorary titles
Preceded by The Earl of Leicester	Lord Lieutenant of Kent; 1737–1745	Succeeded by The Earl of Rockingham
Peerage of Great Britain
Preceded by Lewis Watson	Earl of Rockingham; 1724–1745	Succeeded by Thomas Watson
