= Marquess of Rockingham =

Marquessate in the Peerage of Great Britain

Marquessate of Rockingham
- Arms of the Marquess of Rockingham Blazon Arms: Quarterly : Quarterly : 1st and 4th Argent, on a chevron engrailed azure between three martlets sable, as many crescents or, (Watson); 2nd and 3rd Sable, a chevron between three leopards' heads or (Wentworth). Crest: A griffin passant, wings elevated argent, beaked, forlegged and ducally gorged or. Supporters: Dexter: A griffin argent, beaked and forlegged gules, collared vairé ermine and azure; Sinister: A lion or, collared vairé and ermine. Motto: Mea gloria fides (Trust is my renown).
- Creation date: 1746
- Created by: George II
- Peerage: Peerage of Great Britain
- First holder: Thomas Watson-Wentworth, 1st Marquess of Rockingham
- Last holder: Charles Watson-Wentworth, 2nd Marquess of Rockingham
- Remainder to: the 1st Marquess's heirs male of the body lawfully begotten
- Subsidiary titles: Earl of Malton; Viscount Higham; Baron Rockingham; Baron Malton; Baron Harrowden; Baron Wath; Baronet Harrowden; Baronet of Rockingham Castle
- Extinction date: 1 July 1782
- Seat: Wentworth Woodhouse Rockingham Castle
- Motto: Mea Gloria Fides

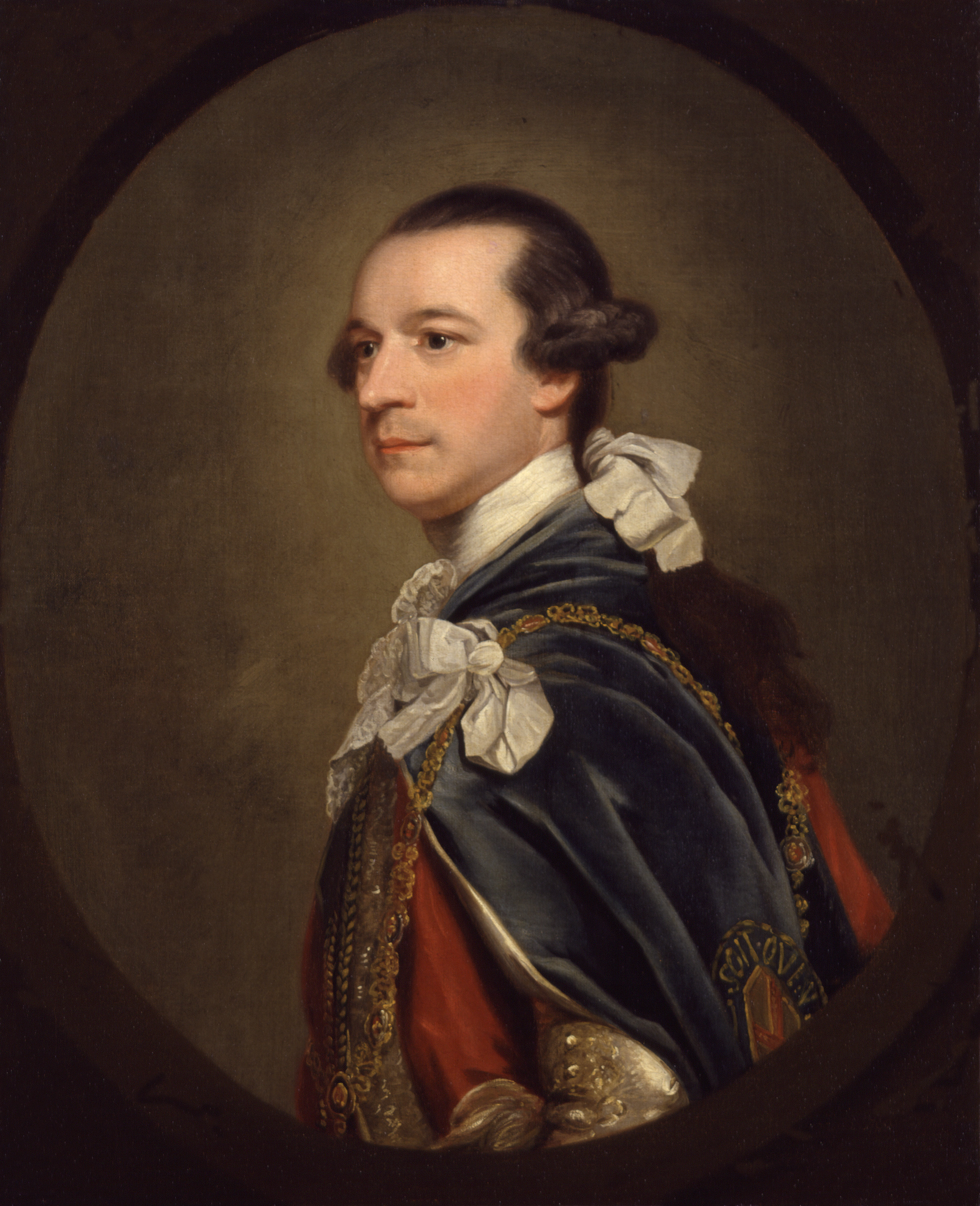
Portrait of the Marquess of Rockingham. Charles Watson-Wentworth, 2nd Marquess of Rockingham, after Sir Joshua Reynolds. National Portrait Gallery, London

Marquess of Rockingham, in the County of Northampton, was a title in the Peerage of Great Britain. It was created in 1746 for Thomas Watson-Wentworth, 1st Earl of Malton. The Watson family descended from Lewis Watson, Member of Parliament for Lincoln. He was created a Baronet, of Rockingham Castle in the County of Northampton, in the Baronetage of England in 1621. In 1645 he was further honoured when he was raised to the Peerage of England as Baron Rockingham. The third Baron served as Lord-Lieutenant of Kent. In 1714 he was created Baron Throwley, Viscount Sondes and Earl of Rockingham in the Peerage of Great Britain. His eldest son Edward Watson, Viscount Sondes, predeceased him and he was succeeded by his grandson, the second Earl (the eldest son of Lord Sondes). The second Earl was Lord-Lieutenant of Kent before his early death in 1745. He was childless and was succeeded by his younger brother, Thomas. He had previously represented Canterbury in Parliament.

He was succeeded in the baronetcy and barony of Rockingham by his first cousin once removed, Thomas Watson-Wentworth, 1st Earl of Malton, who became the sixth Baron. He was the son of the Honourable Thomas Watson-Wentworth, third son of the second Baron. He had adopted the additional surname Wentworth when he inherited the estate of his maternal uncle, William Wentworth, 2nd Earl of Strafford, in 1695. In 1728 he was raised to the Peerage of Great Britain as Baron Malton. In 1733 he was made Baron Harrowden, Baron Wath, Viscount Higham and Earl of Malton in the Peerage of Great Britain. In April 1746, two months after succeeding in the barony of Rockingham, he was created Marquess of Rockingham, in the County of Northampton, in the Peerage of Great Britain. He was succeeded by his second but only surviving son, the second Marquess. In September 1750, two months before succeeding his father, he was raised to the Peerage of Ireland in his own right as Baron Malton and Earl Malton. Lord Rockingham was a prominent Whig grandee and served as Prime Minister of Great Britain between 1765 and 1766 and again in 1782. When he died in 1782 all of his titles became extinct. His estates passed to his nephew, William Fitzwilliam, 4th Earl Fitzwilliam.

The family seats were Rockingham Castle, Northamptonshire, and Wentworth Woodhouse, near Rotherham, Yorkshire.

== Barons Rockingham (1645) ==
- Lewis Watson, 1st Baron Rockingham (1584–1653)
- Edward Watson, 2nd Baron Rockingham (1630–1689)
- Lewis Watson, 3rd Baron Rockingham (1655–1724) (created Earl of Rockingham in 1714)

== Earls of Rockingham (1714) ==
- Lewis Watson, 1st Earl of Rockingham (1655–1724)
  - Edward Watson, Viscount Sondes (1686–1722)
- Lewis Watson, 2nd Earl of Rockingham (c. 1714–1745)
- Thomas Watson, 3rd Earl of Rockingham (1715–1746) (earldom extinct at his death)

== Barons Rockingham (1645; Reverted) ==
- Thomas Watson-Wentworth, 1st Earl of Malton, 6th Baron Rockingham (1693–1750) (created Marquess of Rockingham in 1746)

== Marquesses of Rockingham (1746) ==
- Thomas Watson-Wentworth, 1st Marquess of Rockingham (1693–1750)
- Charles Watson-Wentworth, 2nd Marquess of Rockingham (1730–1782)

== See also ==
- Earl of Feversham
- Earl Sondes
- Earl of Strafford
