= Edward Watson, Viscount Sondes =

British Whig politician

Edward Watson
- Viscount Sondes
- Coat of arms
- Reign: George I
- Born: 3 July 1686
- Died: 20 March 1722 (aged 35); Kensington Gravel Pits
- Buried: 31 March 1722; Rockingham church
- Noble family: Watson
- Spouse: Lady Catherine Tufton
- Issue: Lewis Watson, 2nd Earl of Rockingham; Thomas Watson, 3rd Earl of Rockingham; Edward Watson; Catherine Watson
- Father: Lewis Watson, 1st Earl of Rockingham
- Mother: Lady Catherine Sondes
- Occupation: politician

Edward Watson, Viscount Sondes (3 July 1686 – 20 March 1722) of Lees Court, Sheldwich, Kent, and Park Place, London, was a British Whig politician who sat in the House of Commons between 1708 and 1722.

Watson was the eldest son of Lewis Watson, 1st Earl of Rockingham and Lady Catherine Sondes, daughter of George Sondes, 1st Earl of Feversham. He matriculated at Merton College, Oxford on 1 June 1703, aged 16 and travelled abroad to Germany in 1707.

Watson arrived back from Germany in 1708, in time to be elected as a Whig Member of Parliament for Canterbury at the 1708 British general election. He proposed a motion on 25 January 1709 for an address to the Queen that she should consider remarrying. He also supported the naturalization of the Palatines. He was appointed to a committee to draft a bill to limit the time allowed for public mourning, since this was felt to be having an adverse effect on Canterbury's silk trade. He also voted for the impeachment of Dr Sacheverell and possibly in consequence he lost his seat at the 1710 British general election. He was returned unopposed as MP for New Romney at a by-election on 20 April 1713. Following his father's elevation as Earl of Rockingham in 1714, he was styled Viscount Sondes. In 1718, he went over to the Opposition and in 1719 he was appointed a Gentleman of the Bedchamber to the Prince of Wales.

He married, on 21 March 1709, Lady Catherine Tufton, eldest daughter of Thomas Tufton, 6th Earl of Thanet in 1709, and had three sons and a daughter:

- Lewis Watson, 2nd Earl of Rockingham, no issue
- Thomas Watson, 3rd Earl of Rockingham, no issue
- Edward Watson, no issue
- Catherine Watson, married Edward Southwell and had issue.

Watson died of consumption at Kensington Gravel Pits 20 March and was buried 31 March 1722 at Rockingham, predeceasing his father by 2 years. In 1729 his widow and her four sisters became co-heiresses to the Barony of Clifford. She died 13 February and was buried 20 February 1734 at Rockingham. The abeyance was terminated in 1734 for the third sister Margaret, wife of Lord Lovel, but following her death without surviving issue in 1775 the barony was restored in favour of Viscount Sondes' grandson, Edward Southwell, 20th Baron Clifford.

== Sources ==
- Cokayne, G. E. (1913). Gibbs, Vicary; Doubleday, H. Arthur (eds.). The Complete Peerage of England, Scotland, Ireland, Great Britain and the United Kingdom. Vol. 3. London: St Catherine Press.
- Cokayne, G. E. (1949). White, Geoffrey H. (ed.). The Complete Peerage, or a History of the House of Lords and all its Members from the Earliest Times. Vol. 11. London: St Catherine Press. pp. 57–58.
- Foster, Joseph, ed. (1891) [1st pub. Oxford: University of Oxford:1891]. "Wasborow-Wesley". Alumni Oxonienses 1500-1714. British History Online. pp. 1577–1600.
- Handley, Stuart (2002). "Watson, Hon. Edward (1686-1722), of Lees Court, Sheldwich, Kent, and Park Place, London". In Hayton, D.; Cruickshanks, E.; Handley, S. (eds.). The History of Parliament: the House of Commons 1690-1715 – via History of Parliament Online.
- Henning, Basil Duke (1983). "Watson, Hon. Lewis (1655-1724), of Rockingham Castle, Northants". In Henning, Basil Duke (ed.). The History of Parliament: the House of Commons 1660-1690 – via History of Parliament Online.
- Newman, A. N. (1970). "Watson, Edward, Visct. Sondes (?1686-1722)". In Sedgwick, Romney (ed.). The History of Parliament: the House of Commons 1715-1754 – via History of Parliament Online.
- Wise, Charles (1891). Rockingham Castle and the Watsons. London: Elliot Stock. pp. 101, 247. OCLC 902976023.

Parliament of Great Britain
Preceded by Henry Lee; John Hardres	Member of Parliament for Canterbury; 1708–1710; With: Thomas D'Aeth	Succeeded by John Hardres; Henry Lee
Preceded by Robert Furnese; Walter Whitfield	Member of Parliament for New Romney; 1713–1722; With: Robert Furnese	Succeeded by Robert Furnese; David Papillon
