= William Jacob =

William Jacob may refer to:

- William Jacob (MP, died 1851) (c. 1761–1851), English merchant, shipowner, scientist, and MP for Westbury, and for Rye
- William Jacob (Canterbury MP) (c. 1623–1692), English physician and politician
- William Stephen Jacob (1813–1862), English astronomer in India
- William Ungoed Jacob (1910-1990), Anglican priest and author
- William Jacob, Irish baker, namesake of the brand Jacob's
- William Mungo Jacob, known as Bill Jacob (born 1944), Anglican priest and author

== See also ==
- William Jacobs (disambiguation)
