= Thomas Meredith (Kent MP) =

English Whig politician

Thomas Meredith (after 1666 – 11 July 1701) was an English Whig politician who sat in the House of Commons of England in 1701.

Thomas Meredith was the son of Sir Richard Meredith, 2nd Baronet, of Leeds Abbey, Kent, and his wife Susanna, daughter of Philip Skippon. He was educated at Trinity Hall, Cambridge and entered Inner Temple in 1683. In 1689 he became a J.P. for Kent.

Meredith was elected Member of Parliament (MP) for Kent in an uncontested election in January 1701. He was a Whig and presented the Kentish Petition to the House in March. Although apparently in good health, he sickened when he went to the country during the recess in August and died in London.

Parliament of England
Preceded by Sir James Oxenden, Bt; Sir Stephen Lennard, Bt	Member of Parliament for Kent; January–July 1701; With: Sir Thomas Hales, Bt	Succeeded by Sir Thomas Hales, Bt; William Campion
