= Thomas Colepeper (colonel) =

English military officer (1637–1708)

Thomas Colepeper (1637–1708) was an English colonel.

== Life ==
Colepeper was the only son of Sir Thomas Colepeper, knt., lieutenant of Dover Castle, and St. Stephen's, otherwise Hackington, Kent, by his wife, Lady Barbara, daughter of Robert Sidney, 1st Earl of Leicester, and widow of Thomas Smythe, 1st Viscount Strangford. He was born on the Christmas Day of 1637. Colepeper lost both his parents six years later.

Colepeper lived as a steward with the Strangford family. With his half-brother, Philip, Viscount Strangford, he busied himself in promoting the king's return and was imprisoned by the council of state in August and September 1659.

In 1662 he married Frances, third and youngest daughter of John, Lord Frecheville, of Staveley, Derbyshire, by his second wife, Sarah, daughter and heiress of Sir John Harrington, knt. It was a stolen match, and so displeasing to Lord Frecheville that while outwardly reconciled, he refused to make his daughter any settlement. At his death in March 1682, he left her an annuity of £300, which owing to the reduced state of his fortune, was probably never paid. Lord Frecheville had been obliged to sell his manor of Staveley and other lands to the Earl of Devonshire in the October previous to his death. Colepeper afterward made this sale the subject of much litigation. He used every means in his power to set aside the sale, and, exasperated by repeated failure, he took occasion to publicly insult his opponent by striking him within the precincts of the court at Whitehall Palace on 9 July 1685; John Evelyn witnessed the assault. For this offense, Colepeper was imprisoned in the Marshalsea Prison and subsequently condemned to lose his hand. His wife's letters to him during his imprisonment are in British Library Harley MS 7005. At her request, Lord Danby used his influence with the king and Colepeper was pardoned.

After Monmouth's rebellion, Colepeper was encouraged to show himself at court, where he would in all probability have obtained some minor office. But on the evening of 26 April 1687, the Earl of Devonshire, encountering him in the Vane Chamber at Whitehall, while the king and queen were in the presence, challenged him to walk out, and on Colepeper's refusal struck him with his cane. It was now the earl's turn to be imprisoned and tried. As the result, he was fined £30,000, and in default of payment was committed to the King's Bench Prison, from which, however, he soon managed to escape. In the next reign, the fine was remitted. The sequel was recorded by Narcissus Luttrell who, under the date of 1 July 1697, wrote: "Yesterday the Duke of Devon meeting Coll. Colpepper at the auction house in St. Albans Street, caned him for being troublesome to him in the late reign."

Colepeper had now lost all hope of preferment at court, and having sold his family estate in 1675, was left without provision in his old age. His wife had died on 3 December 1698, leaving no issue. The rest of his life is a record of schemes, pretended discoveries of mines, and projects for the improvement of the army, navy, and revenue. He died at his lodging in Tothill Street, Westminster, in December 1708 and was buried on the 28th in the neighboring church of St. Margaret. He had been elected to the Royal Society on 28 May 1668 and was the friend of Thomas Bushell the engineer.

== Works ==
Many of Colepeper's manuscripts are in the British Library. The more important is his transcript of the 'Frecheville Evidences', from a copy 'made by some herald,' probably Richard St. George (British Library Harley MS 7435), and the eighteen volumes of what he called 'Adversaria' (Harley MSS 7587–7605).

Other manuscripts in the British Library are:

- Collections from Public Records (Harley MS 6833)
- Commonplace Books (Harley MSS 817–818)
- Memorandum Book (Add MS 11205)

At the end of Harley MS 7560, ff. 293–7 are some sheets of a petition to the Court of Chancery, a document detailing a secret marriage between the colonel and Sir Thomas Grosvenor's widow.
