= John Sidney, 6th Earl of Leicester =

English soldier, peer, landowner and courtier

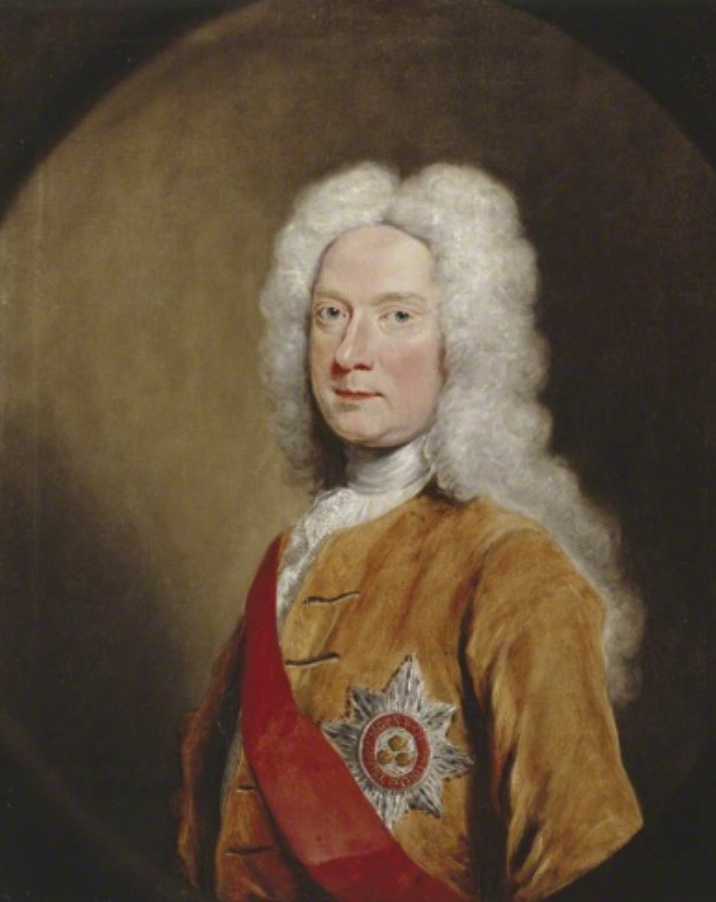
The Earl of Leicester, c. 1730, painted by Joseph Highmore

John Sidney, 6th Earl of Leicester KB (14 February 1680 – 27 September 1737) was an English soldier, peer, landowner, and courtier, and from 1705 to 1737 was Earl of Leicester, with a seat in the House of Lords.

== Life ==
Leicester was born at his family seat of Penshurst Place in Kent. He was one of the five sons of Robert Sidney, 4th Earl of Leicester (1649–1702) by Lady Elizabeth Egerton (1653–1709), the daughter of John Egerton, 2nd Earl of Bridgewater.

Before inheriting the title and estates, Leicester was Lieutenant Colonel of the 1st Regiment of Foot Guards, 1702 to 1705, then briefly a member of the English House of Commons as one of the two members for Brackley, sitting as a Whig, and later in 1705 succeeded his brother, Philip Sidney, as Earl of Leicester.

He was a Lord of the Bedchamber, 1717 to 1727, Lord Warden of the Cinque Ports, 1717 to 1728, Captain of the Yeomen of the Guard, 1725 to 1731, Lord Lieutenant of Kent from 1724 until his death, a Privy Councillor and Constable of the Tower of London from 1731.

Leicester died at Penshurst Place and is buried at Penshurst. His younger brother Jocelyn Sidney succeeded as 7th Earl of Leicester.

== Notes ==
Parliament of Great Britain
Preceded by Charles Egerton; John James	Member of Parliament for Brackley; 1705; With: Charles Egerton	Succeeded by Charles Egerton; Harry Mordaunt
Honorary titles
Preceded by The Duke of Ormonde	Lord Warden of the Cinque Ports; 1717–1727	Succeeded by The Duke of Dorset
Preceded by The 1st Earl of Rockingham	Lord Lieutenant of Kent; 1724–1737	Succeeded by The 2nd Earl of Rockingham
Preceded by Lord Stanhope	Captain of the Yeomen of the Guard; 1725–1731	Succeeded by The Earl of Ashburnham
Preceded by The Viscount Lonsdale	Constable of the Tower of London; Lord Lieutenant of the Tower Hamlets; 1731–1737	Vacant Title next held by The Lord Cornwallis
Peerage of England
Preceded by Philip Sidney	Earl of Leicester; 1705–1737	Succeeded by Jocelyn Sidney
