= Sir William Honywood, 2nd Baronet =

English politician

Sir William Honywood, 2nd Baronet (ca. 1654 – 8 June 1748) was an English politician who sat in the House of Commons from 1685 to 1695.

Honywood was the son of Sir Edward Honywood, 1st Baronet and his wife Elizabeth Maynard, daughter of Sir John Maynard of Tooting, Surrey. He inherited the baronetcy of Evington on the death of his father in 1670/ In 1685 Honywood was elected Mayor and member of parliament for Canterbury and held the seat until 1695.

Honywood married Anna Christiana Newman daughter of Richard Newman of Fifehead Magdalen in Dorset. They had two sons and four daughters. He died at Evington at the age of 94 and was buried at Elmstead. His grandson Edward succeeded in the baronetcy.

Parliament of England
Preceded by Lewis Watson; Vincent Denne	Member of Parliament for Canterbury; 1685–1695; With: Henry Lee; George Sayer	Succeeded by Henry Lee; George Sayer
Baronetage of England
Preceded by Edward Honywood	Baronet (of Evington); 1670–1748	Succeeded by John Honywood
