= Anthony Aucher =

17th-century English politician

Sir Anthony Aucher, 1st Baronet (1614 – 31 May 1692) was an English politician who sat in the House of Commons in 1660. He supported the Royalist cause during the English Civil War.

Aucher was the son of Sir Anthony Aucher (c. 1586–1637) and his wife Hester Collett, daughter of Peter Collett. His father was the son of Edward Aucher (d. 14 February 1568), and grandson of Anthony Aucher (d. 9 January 1558), an agent of Henry VIII, who in 1547, received the Manor of Plumford in the parish of Ospringe from Edward VI.

Aucher was knighted at Whitehall on 4 July 1641, however was imprisoned two years later for his involvement in the anti-parliamentarian Petition of Kent. He had to stay in Winchester House for nine months and was then released. In 1660 he was elected Member of Parliament (MP) for Canterbury in the Convention Parliament. On 4 July 1666, he was made a baronet, of Bishopsbourne, in the County of Kent.

By 1635, he married firstly Elizabeth Hatton, daughter of Sir Robert Hatton. She died in 1648, and Aucher married secondly Elizabeth Hewytt, daughter of Robert Hewytt at St Bride's Church in London on 13 October 1681. He had six sons and one daughter with his first wife, who died all in his lifetime, and two sons and two daughters with his second wife. Archer was buried in Bourne, Kent and was succeeded in the baronetcy by his oldest surviving son Anthony. His other son, John, was a prebend at Canterbury.

Parliament of England
Preceded by Sir Edward Master; John Nutt	Member of Parliament for Canterbury; 1660–1661; With: Heneage Finch	Succeeded by Francis Lovelace; Sir Edward Master
Baronetage of England
New creation	Baronet (of Bishopsbourne); 1666–1692	Succeeded by Anthony Aucher
