= Samuel Milles =

English politician

Samuel Milles (c. 1669 – 10 December 1727) was an English politician who sat in the House of Commons from 1722 to 1727.

Milles was elected Member of Parliament (MP) for Canterbury in 1722 and held the seat to 1727.

Milles' daughter Mary married Henry Lee Warner MP for Hindon. Another daughter Anne, who was called the Beauty of Kent, died unmarried aged 20 in 1714 and was commemorated in Canterbury Cathedral by a white marble monument with her bust carved in white marble.

Parliament of Great Britain
Preceded by John Hardres; Sir Thomas Hales, Bt	Member of Parliament for Canterbury; 1722–1727; With: Sir Thomas Hales, Bt	Succeeded by Sir William Hardres, Bt; Sir Thomas Hales, Bt
