= Sir Robert Hales, 1st Baronet =

English lawyer and politician

Sir Robert Hales, 1st Baronet (c. 1610 – c. 1695) was an English lawyer and politician who sat in the House of Commons in 1659.

Hales was the son of Thomas Hales of Beaksbourne, Kent, and his wife Mary Peyton, daughter of Sir Thomas Peyton of Knowlton, Kent. He was admitted to Inner Temple in November 1628, and became a barrister in 1637. In 1659, he was elected member of parliament for Hythe in the Third Protectorate Parliament. He was created a baronet on 12 July 1660.

Hales died between December 1693 when he made his will, and 26 February 1696 when the will was proved.

Hales married Catherine Ashcomb, daughter of Sir William Ashcomb of Alvescot, Oxfordshire. They had a son, John Hales, and a grandson, Jacob Hales.

Parliament of England
| Preceded by Not represented in Second Protectorate Parliament | Member of Parliament for Hythe; 1659; With: William Kenrick | Succeeded by Not represented in Restored Rump |
Baronetage of England
| New creation | Baronet (of Beakesbourne); 1660–1693 | Succeeded by Thomas Hales |
