= Hales Place =

Coordinates: 51.295°N 1.08°E

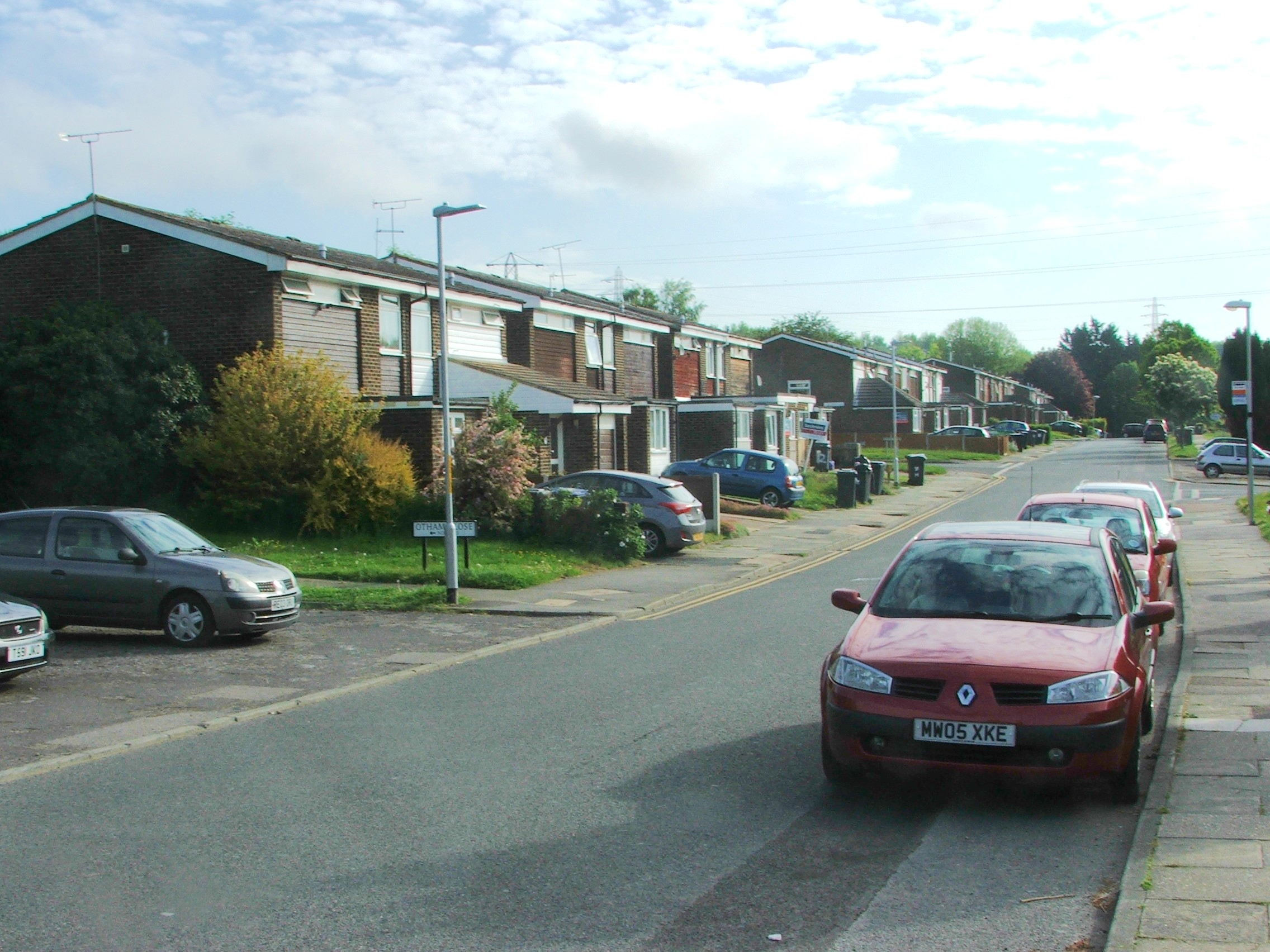

- Arms of Hales

- Location within Kent
- District: City of Canterbury
- Shire county: Kent
- Region: South East
- Country: England
- Sovereign state: United Kingdom
- Post town: Canterbury
- Postcode district: CT2
- Police: Kent
- Fire: Kent
- Ambulance: South East Coast

The residential area known as Hales Place is part of the civil parish of Hackington, and lies to the north of the city of Canterbury in Kent, England. The residents include large numbers of students from the nearby University of Kent.

== Crime ==
The area suffers from crime coming from violent or sexual offences. For every 1’000 people, there is 129.6 crimes at a 14% increase. Compared to the surrounding areas of Canterbury, Hales Place is more crime-ridden compared to the surrounding areas in Canterbury.

== History ==
Hales Place is named after old mansion demolished in 1928. Building in the area itself dates to 1227, Simon, Archdeacon of Canterbury had a residence in Hackington built for his brother, Archbishop Stephen Langton. During its time, Two archbishops died residing: Thomas Arundel and William Warham. The Archdeacons estate fell to the ownership of the crown and granted to Sir Rodger Manwood in 1562. The old archdeacons residence was granted in a ruined state, and rather than extend or rebuild, Sir Rodger Manhood erected new second a mansion onto the estate.Sir Peter, son of Rodger Manhood, inherited the estate and live lavishly off it. Before Peter’s death in 1642, the estate was sold by his son Sir John to Thomas Colepeppe. In 1643, The name of the house appears in a unexecuted deed as St Stephen's House.

Due to legal expenses, Thomas sold the estate to Sir Edward Hales, 3rd Baronet of Woodchruch in 1675. The old manison stood until 1759.

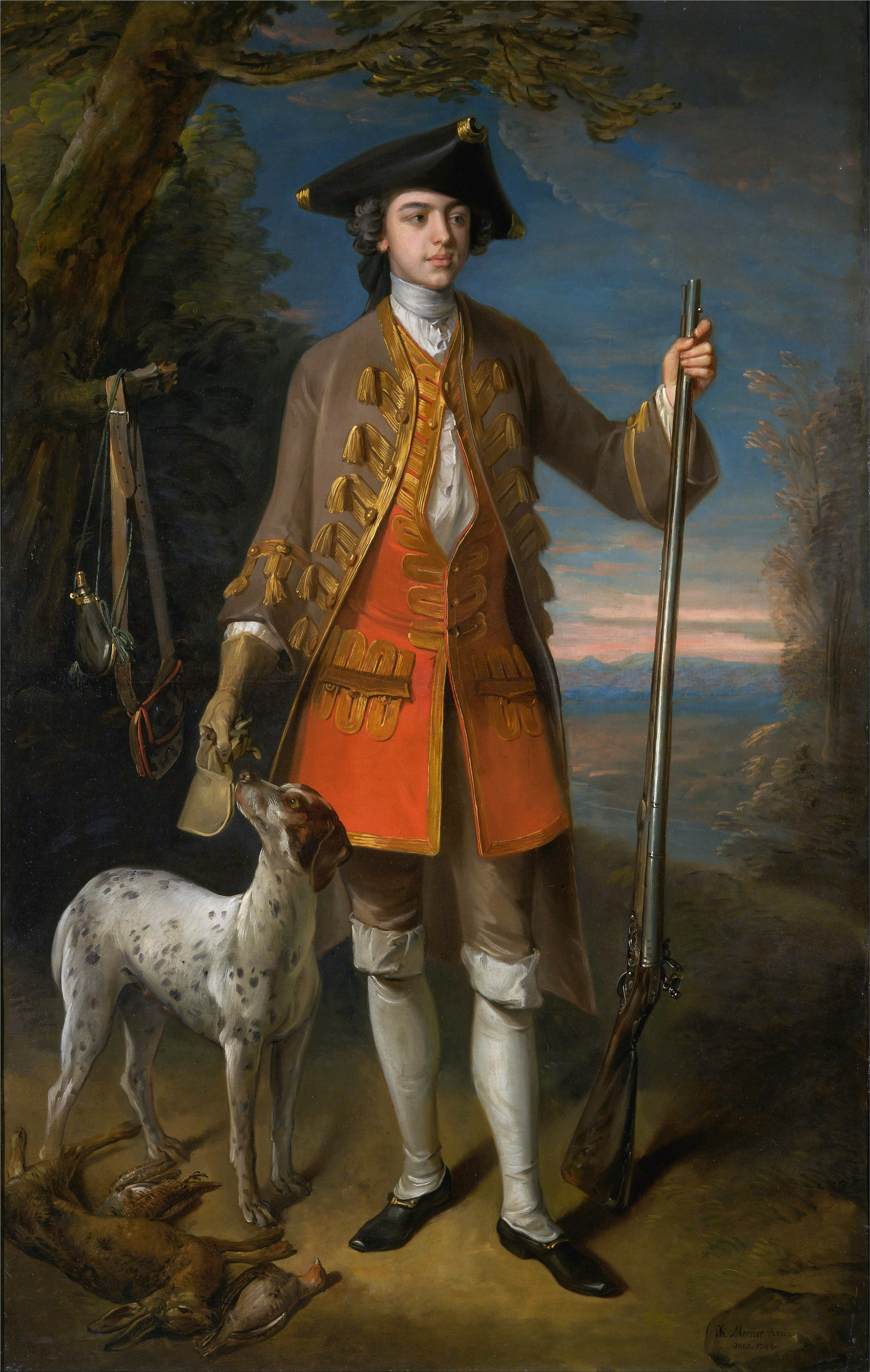
Edward Hales, 5th Baronet. Painted by Philippe Mercier

Edward Hales, 5th Baronet, grandson of Sir Edward Hales, 3rd Baronet of Woodchruch demolished the old building for a grander mansion for his successors. The mansion constructed was known as 'Hales Place.' He built the Roman Catholic Chapel known as Belvedere Chapel. Edward died of illness on 29 August 1802.

The property fell to his son and last Baronet, Sir Edward Hales, 6th Baronet The grounds were used for sports such as sport fox hunting in the early 1820s. Hales Place was apart of fashionable arrivals in 1823, where noble European counts and lords toured. However, Edward died with no heir in 15 March 1829. The estate fell to his nephew, Edward de Morlaincourt, who then changed his surname to Hales. He married Edmee Nicole Felicite Pulcherie de Sercey, daughter of a vice admiral.

They had only one child, born on the 4th December 1835 in Boulogne, France. Edward died on 12 February 1837, and left his daughter, Mary Barbara Felicite Hales, inheriting the property. Mary later came to France to join a Carmelite convent. The Roman Catholic Chapel was robbed in 1857, taken of a silver Chalice, two small silver and brass figures of Jesus Christ on the cross, silver cruets, and a handful of silver spoons. In 1859, Mary Hales became a nun. She planned to turn Hales Place into a Carmelite nunnery. Her building plans for Hales Place waes of a church, a convent, farmland enclosed by brick wall. The architect for the project was Edward Welby Pugin.

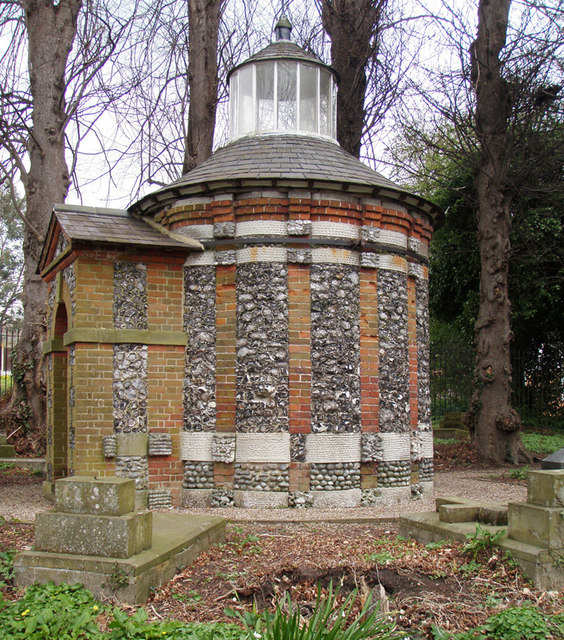
Belvedere Chapel

In 1874, she gave a portion of her estate to Benedictine nuns of Ramsgate. The nuns ,ade an appeal for £50’000 to create an abbey, offering those who contribute names ingrained in a stone slab. The estate was then brought in 1880 by exiled Jesuits. Hales Place was renamed to Saint Mary’s Collage, two extensions expanded the capacity to 1000 students. The wings consisted of a laboratory, a dining hall, chapel, exhibition halls, refectories and dormitories. In celebration of the top brick being placed, the builders dined in the halls with the priests.

The Collage had a range of classes such as blacksmithing, plumbing and carpentry. The college was popular with the French nobility, who sent their sons there to learn away from political persecution in their home country. Amongst their students was Teilhard de Chardin, a famous paeleontologist and theologian. Nineteen members of the Jesuit collage and young student were buried in Belvedere Chapel. In 1927, the estate was auctioned off. The purchase would be finalised in 1928, the catholic chapel striped bare and furniture sold at auctions. Deceased members of the Hales family were reburied by the chapel. Hales place was demolished the same year. In 1953, the land was purchased by the Canterbury City Council for housing.

== Notable people ==
Sir Edward Hales, 3rd Baronet

Frances Lee, Countess of Lichfield

Henri de Lubac
