= Sir Thomas D'Aeth, 1st Baronet =

English Whig politician

Sir Thomas D'Aeth, 1st Baronet (1678–1745), of Knowlton Court and North Cray, Kent, was an English Whig politician who sat in the House of Commons between 1708 and 1722.

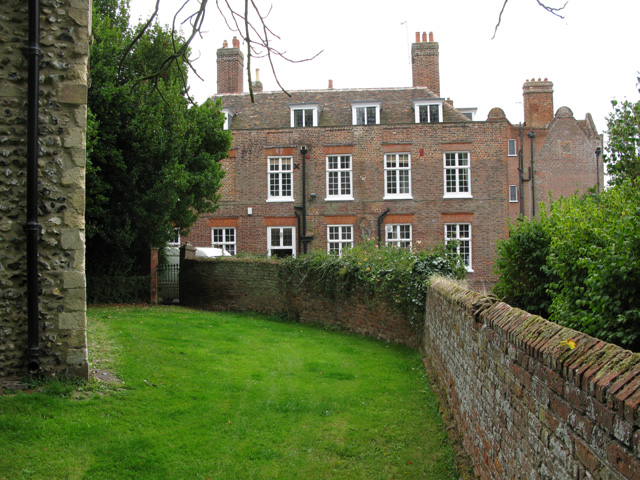
Knowlton Court, Kent

D'Aeth was the only surviving son of Thomas D’Aeth, a merchant of St Dionis Backchurch, London, and of his wife Elhanna Rolt, daughter of Sir John Rolt of Milton Ernest, Bedfordshire. He travelled in Italy from about 1698 to 1700, and spent some time at Padua University in 1699. He married Elizabeth Narborough, daughter and eventual heiress of Admiral Sir John Narborough of Knowlton Court on 23 January 1701.

At the 1708 general election D'Aeth was elected as Whig Member of Parliament for Canterbury. He supported the government and voted for the naturalization of the Palatines in 1709. He acted as a teller on 31 March 1709 against the discussion of a petition which opposed a clause in the Earl of Clanricarde's estate bill. He was named to a drafting committee concerned with creating a time-limit for public mourning and voted for the impeachment of Dr Sacheverell. He was defeated in 1710. He was appointed commissioner for Dover Harbour in 1709, and had been appointed a member of the Society for Promoting Christian Knowledge by 1712.

D'Aeth was elected as MP for Sandwich at the 1715 general election. He was created baronet of Knowlton on 16 July 1716. Subsequent to the death of his first wife on 24 June 1721, he did not stand at the 1722 general election. He subsequently married his second wife Jane.

D'Aeth died on 4 January 1745. He had two sons and five daughters by his first wife, and one son by his second wife.

Parliament of Great Britain
| Preceded by Henry Lee; John Hardres | Member of Parliament for Canterbury; 1708–1710; With: Edward Watson | Succeeded by Henry Lee; John Hardres |
| Preceded by John Michel; Sir Henry Oxenden | Member of Parliament for Sandwich; 1715–1722; With: Sir Henry Oxenden 1715–1720; Sir George Oxenden 1720–1722 | Succeeded by Josiah Burchett; Sir George Oxenden |
Baronetage of Great Britain
| New creation | Baronet (of Knowlton); 1716–1745 | Succeeded by Narborough D'Aeth |
