= William Campion (1640–1702) =

English politician

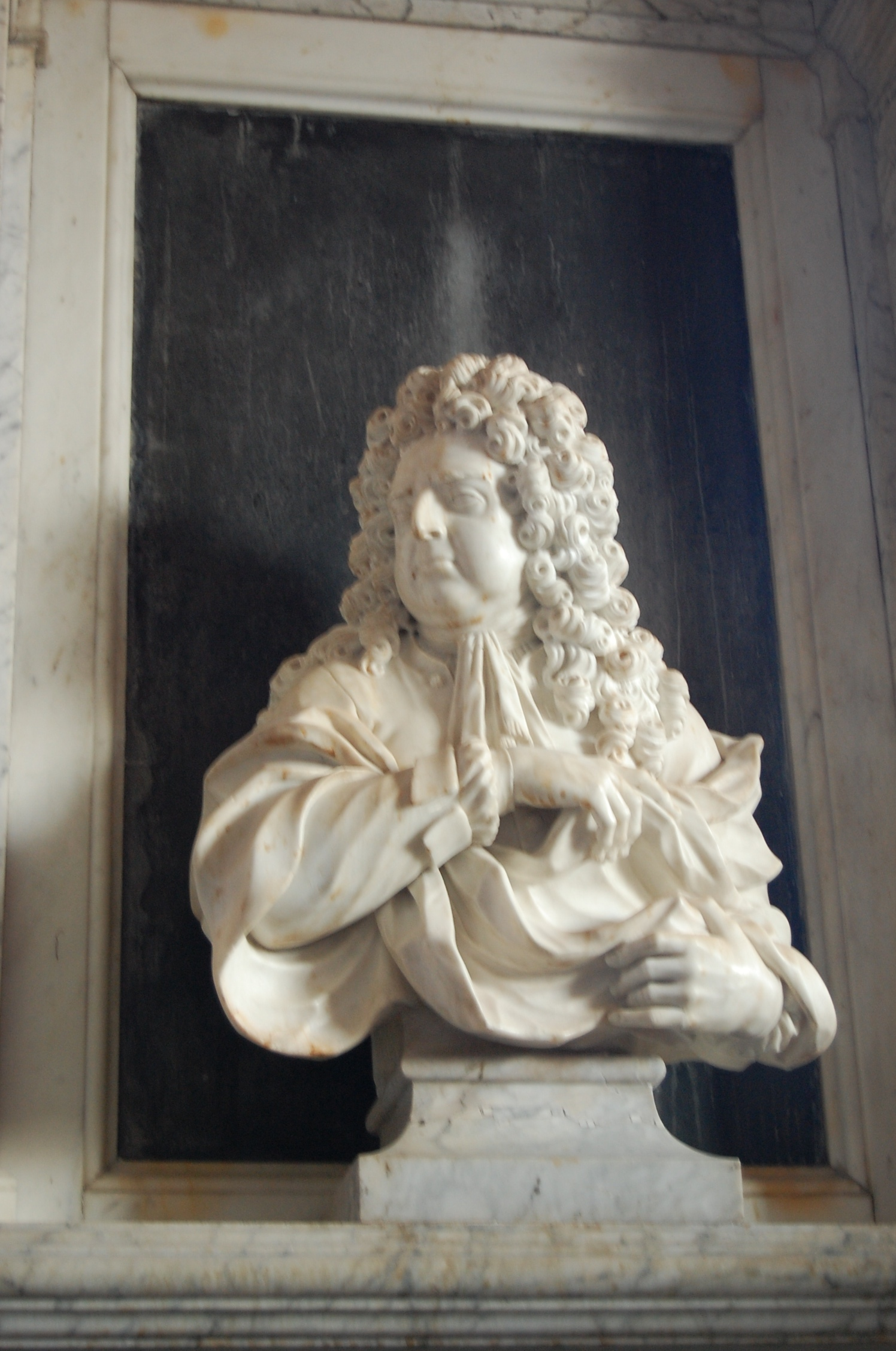
The bust of William Campion on his memorial in St. Mary's church in Goudhurst in Kent

William Campion (6 February 1640 – 20 September 1702) was an English politician who sat in the House of Commons between 1689 and 1702.

Campion was the son of Sir William Campion of Combwell, and his wife Grace Parker, daughter of Sir Thomas Parker of Ratton Sussex. He was educated at Trinity College, Cambridge, and admitted to Middle Temple in 1657.

Campion was elected Member of Parliament for Seaford in 1689 and held the seat until July 1698. He was then re-elected for Seaford in December 1698 and held the seat until 1701. In 1701 he was elected MP for Kent and held the seat until his death in 1702.

Campion died aged 62 and was buried at St. Mary's church in Goudhurst.

Parliament of England
Preceded by Sir William Thomas, Bt; Edward Selwyn	Member of Parliament for Seaford; 1689–July 1698; With: Sir Nicholas Pelham 1689–1690; Henry Pelham 1690–1695; William Lowndes 1695–1698	Succeeded by William Lowndes; Sir William Thomas, Bt
Preceded by William Lowndes; Sir William Thomas, Bt	Member of Parliament for Seaford; December 1698–1701; With: William Lowndes	Succeeded by William Lownes; Sir William Thomas, Bt
Preceded by Sir Thomas Hales, Bt; Thomas Meredith	Member of Parliament for Kent; 1701–1702; With: Sir Thomas Hales, Bt	Succeeded by Sir Thomas Hales, Bt; Francis Leigh
