= Henry Lee (Canterbury MP) =

English Tory politician

Henry Lee (c. 1657 – 6 September 1734) of Dungeon, Canterbury, was an English Tory politician who sat in the House of Commons in three periods between 1685 and 1715.

Lee was the son of Dr John Lee, Archdeacon of Rochester, and his third wife Anne English, daughter of Henry English of Maidstone. His father later took the name of Warner by Act of Parliament under the terms of the will of his uncle, John Warner, Bishop of Rochester. He matriculated at Balliol College, Oxford, on 4 July 1673, aged 16. He married Dorothy Howe, daughter of Sir George Howe, 1st Baronet, and his wife Elizabeth Grimstone, daughter of Sir Harbottle Grimston, 2nd Baronet, on 16 October 1679.

Lee purchased the manor of Dungeon in Kent. He became an alderman of Canterbury and in March 1685 was elected Member of Parliament (MP) for Canterbury as a Tory. In 1687 he was elected Mayor of Canterbury, but dismissed from office by order of King James II. However he was re-elected MP for Canterbury in 1689 and held the seat until 1695. He was Colonel of a regiment of the Kent Militia in 1697. He was MP for Canterbury again from 1698 until he was defeated at the 1708 British general election. In 1704 he was appointed a Commissioner of Victualling. He was returned again for Canterbury at the 1710 British general election and was appointed a Commissioner for Victualling again in 1711. He was returned again at the 1713 general election but was defeated in 1715.

Lee died on 6 September 1734. His son Henry Lee Warner, who was MP for Hindon, pulled down the mansion of the Dungeon.

Parliament of England
Preceded by Lewis Watson; Vincent Denne	Member of Parliament for Canterbury; 1685–1695; With: Sir William Honywood, Bt	Succeeded by Sir William Honywood, Bt; George Sayer
Preceded by Sir William Honywood, Bt; George Sayer	Member of Parliament for Canterbury; 1698–1708; With: George Sayer 1698–1705; John Hardres 1705–1708	Succeeded by Edward Watson; Sir Thomas D'Aeth, Bt
Parliament of Great Britain
Preceded by Edward Watson; Sir Thomas D'Aeth, Bt	Member of Parliament for Canterbury; 1710–1715; With: John Hardres	Succeeded by John Hardres; Sir Thomas Hales, Bt
