= John Hardres =

English politician

John Hardres (2 October 1675 – 14 January 1758) of St Georges, Canterbury was an English politician who sat in the House of Commons of England and then the House of Commons of Great Britain in two periods between 1705 and 1722.

Hardres was the son of Thomas Hardres of Canterbury. He was educated at Wadham College, Oxford.

Hardres was elected Member of Parliament (MP) for Canterbury in 1705 and sat to 1708. He was elected again in 1710 and held the seat until 1722.

In 1711, Hardres required an Act of Parliament in order to "sell certain Lands, in the County of Kent, and for settling of others to the Uses therein mentioned".

Hardres' political views were considered ambiguous. He voted against the government, except on the Peerage Bill which he supported and received money through Charles Spencer, 3rd Earl of Sunderland from the King's bounty in 1721. He also appeared to be a Jacobite, and his name was among those sent to the Pretender in 1721 as a likely supporter in the event of a rising. However, he retired in 1722 before he had to declare his views.

Hardres died aged 82, leaving 2 surviving daughters.

Parliament of England
Preceded by Henry Lee; George Sayer	Member of Parliament for Canterbury; 1705–1708; With: Henry Lee	Succeeded by Edward Watson; Sir Thomas D'Aeth, Bt
Parliament of Great Britain
Preceded by Edward Watson; Sir Thomas D'Aeth, Bt	Member of Parliament for Canterbury; 1710–1722; With: Henry Lee 1710–1715; Sir Thomas Hales, Bt 1715–1722	Succeeded by Sir Thomas Hales, Bt; Samuel Milles
