= Thomas Watson, 3rd Earl of Rockingham =

English nobleman and politician

Thomas Watson
- Earl of Rockingham
- Coat of arms
- Reign: George II
- Predecessor: Lewis Watson, 2nd Earl of Rockingham
- Other titles: Viscount Sondes; Baron Throwley; Baron Rockingham
- Born: 30 December 1715
- Died: 26 February 1746 (aged 30)
- Buried: 11 March 1746; Rockingham church
- Noble family: Watson
- Father: Edward Watson, Viscount Sondes
- Mother: Catherine Tufton
- Occupation: politician

Thomas Watson, 3rd Earl of Rockingham (30 December 1715 – 26 February 1746), styled Hon. Thomas Watson until 1745, was an English nobleman and politician. He represented Canterbury in the House of Commons and was appointed Lord Lieutenant of Kent after succeeding to the earldom, but died shortly thereafter.

The second son of Edward Watson, Viscount Sondes, Watson entered Eton College in 1725 and Lincoln's Inn in 1732. In the 1741 British general election, he stood for Canterbury as an opposition Whig. Watson and the Tory Thomas Best ousted the incumbent Sir Thomas Hales, a Whig supporter of Walpole's administration. He continued in opposition to successive governments during his tenure in the House of Commons, which terminated in 1745 when he became Earl of Rockingham on the death of his elder brother Lewis.

Despite his politics, he was appointed Lord Lieutenant of Kent in succession to his brother, but did not long survive the appointment: he died of smallpox at Rockingham Castle 26 February and was buried 11 March 1746 at Rockingham.

On his death, which brought to an end the male line of the Watsons of Rockingham Castle, the Earldom of Rockingham, the Viscountcy of Sondes of Lees Court, and the Barony of Throwley became extinct. He was succeeded as Baron Rockingham by Thomas Watson-Wentworth, 1st Earl of Malton, his first cousin once removed. Rockingham left his estate to his first cousin Lewis Monson, who thereafter adopted the surname of Watson.

== Sources ==
- Cokayne, G. E. (1949). White, Geoffrey H. (ed.). The Complete Peerage, or a History of the House of Lords and all its Members from the Earliest Times. Vol. 11. London: St Catherine Press. pp. 58–59.
- Handley, Stuart (2002). "Watson, Hon. Edward (1686-1722), of Lees Court, Sheldwich, Kent, and Park Place, London". In Hayton, D.; Cruickshanks, E.; Handley, S. (eds.). The History of Parliament: the House of Commons 1690-1715. British History Online.
- Henning, Basil Duke (1983). "Watson, Hon. Lewis (1655-1724), of Rockingham Castle, Northants". In Henning, Basil Duke (ed.). The History of Parliament: the House of Commons 1660-1690. British History Online.
- Newman, A. N. (1970). "Watson, Hon. Thomas (1715-46)". In Sedgwick, Romney (ed.). The History of Parliament: the House of Commons 1715-1754. History of Parliament.
- Wise, Charles (1891). Rockingham Castle and the Watsons. London: Elliot Stock. OCLC 902976023.

Parliament of Great Britain
Preceded by Thomas May; Sir Thomas Hales, Bt	Member of Parliament for Canterbury; 1741–1745; With: Thomas Best	Succeeded by Sir Thomas Hales, Bt; Thomas Best
Honorary titles
Preceded by The Earl of Rockingham	Lord Lieutenant of Kent; 1746	Succeeded by The Duke of Dorset
Peerage of Great Britain
Preceded by Lewis Watson	Earl of Rockingham; 1745–1746	Extinct
Peerage of England
Preceded by Lewis Watson	Baron Rockingham; 1745–1746	Succeeded by Thomas Watson-Wentworth
