= Francis Leigh (MP for Kent) =

Sir Francis Leigh (ca. 1651 – 17 November 1711), of Hawley, Sutton-at-Hone, Kent, was an English Member of Parliament and lawyer.

He was a Member of Parliament (MP) for Kent from 1702 to 1705.

Parliament of England
Preceded by Sir Thomas Hales, Bt; William Campion	Member of Parliament for Kent; 1702–1705; With: Sir Thomas Hales, Bt	Succeeded by Sir Cholmeley Dering, Bt; Viscount Villiers
