= Edward Master =

English politician

Sir Edward Master(s) (2 August 1610 – 22 January 1691) of Canterbury, Kent was an English politician who sat in the House of Commons at various times between 1640 and 1679.

He was the son of Giles Master of Henshurst, Woodchurch, Kent.

Master(s) was High Sheriff of Kent for 1639–40.

In April 1640, he was elected Member of Parliament for Canterbury for the Short Parliament. In November 1640, he was re-elected MP for Canterbury in the Long Parliament and remained until 1653, surviving Pride's Purge. He was elected MP for Canterbury in 1661 and sat until 1679 in the Cavalier Parliament. He was knighted in 1660.

Master(s) died aged 80 and was buried with a memorial at St Paul's Church, Canterbury. He had married in 1635, Dorcas, the daughter of Sir Hugh Hamersley, Lord Mayor of London 1627–8, and had many children, including at least 4 sons.

Parliament of England
Vacant Parliament suspended since 1629	Member of Parliament for Canterbury; 1640–1653; With: John Nutt	Not represented in Barebones Parliament
Preceded by Anthony Aucher; Heneage Finch	Member of Parliament for Canterbury; 1661–1679; With: Francis Lovelace (1661–1664); Thomas Hardres (1664–1679)	Succeeded by Edward Hales; William Jacob
