= John Aucher =

English clergyman and royalist supporter

John Aucher D.D., (1619–1700) was an English clergyman and royalist supporter during the Commonwealth of Britain.

== Biography ==
Aucher was the son of Sir Anthony Aucher, knight, of Hautsbourne in Kent. He was nominated to a Canterbury scholarship in Corpus Christi College, Cambridge, by Archbishop Laud in 1634, but after taking the degree of B.A. he removed to Peterhouse for a fellowship, where he commenced M.A. in 1641. He was ejected from his fellowship on account of his loyalty, and during the Commonwealth he wrote two treatises against the dominant party, one of which, however, was not printed till long afterwards. At the Restoration he was created D.D. by royal mandate, and further rewarded with a prebend in the church of Canterbury (1660). He also held the rectory of Allhallows in Lombard Street, London, for many years (1662–85). Dr Aucher died at Canterbury on 12 March 1700–1, and was buried in the cathedral.

== Works ==
His works are:

1. Arguments and reasons to prove the inconvenience & vnlawfulness of taking the new engagement: modestly propounded to all persons concerned. [London: 1650]. 8p. 4to.
2. The arraignment of rebellion, or The irresistibility of sovereign powers vindicated and maintain’d in a reply to a letter. By John Aucher, M.A. ejected fellow of St. Peter’s College in Cambridge. Now D.D. and canon of Christ-Church Cant. London: 1684, 4to; reprinted London, 1718, 8vo.

Cooper also attributes to him the following work, but the title page of the first edition gives the author as Henry Archer and subsequent editions in 1661 as John Archer:

1. 'The Personal Reign of Christ upon Earth,' 1642, 4to.
