= William Jacobs =

William Jacobs may refer to:

- W. W. Jacobs (1863–1943), short story writer
- William H. Jacobs (1831–1882), Wisconsin legislator and banker
- Will Jacobs (born 1955), American comics writer
- William Elmer Jacobs, baseball player
- William Plumer Jacobs (1842–1917), minister and college founder
- William Jacobs (producer) (1887–1953), film producer
- William R. Jacobs Jr. (born 1955), professor of microbiology, immunology and genetics

== See also ==
- William Jacob (disambiguation)
