= George Sayer (MP for Canterbury) =

English courtier and politician

George Sayer (c. 1655 – 21 May 1718) was an English courtier and politician who sat in the House of Commons from 1695 to 1705.

Sayer was the son of Sir John Sayer of Bourchers Hall in Essex and his wife Katherine Van Piershill, daughter of John van Hossen van Piershill of Zealand. His father was page to the Prince of Orange and colonel of a foot regiment. Sayer was vice chamberlain to Queen Catherine, consort of Charles II and to Queen Mary. He became sub-governor and gentleman of the bedchamber to William Duke of Gloucester.

In 1695 Sayer was elected Member of Parliament (MP) for Canterbury and held the seat until 1705.

Sayer died in 1718 and was buried in the church at Charing.

Sayer married Frances Honywood, daughter of Sir Philip Honywood, and through her acquired the estates at Petts.

Parliament of England
Preceded by Sir William Honywood, Bt; Henry Lee	Member of Parliament for Canterbury; 1695–1705; With: Sir William Honywood, Bt 1695–1698; Henry Lee 1698–1705	Succeeded by Henry Lee; John Hardres
