= Aucher baronets =

Extinct baronetcy in the Baronetage of England

The Aucher Baronetcy of Bishopsbourne in the County of Kent, was a title in the Baronetage of England. It was created on 4 July 1666 for Anthony Aucher, who had previously represented Canterbury in Parliament. The title became extinct on the death of the third Baronet in 1726.

== Aucher baronets, of Bishopsbourne (1666) ==
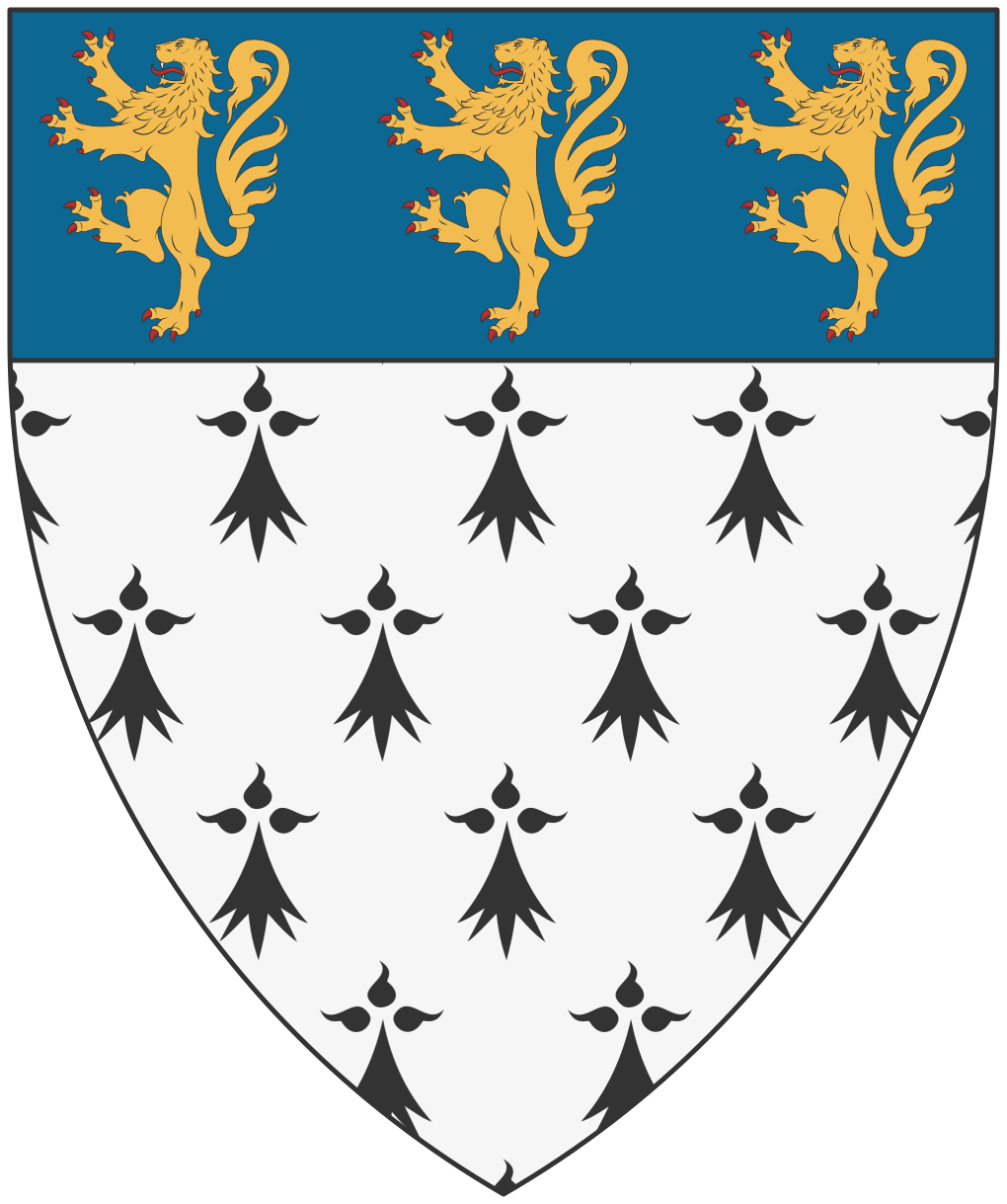
Arms of Aucher of Bishopsbourne

- Sir Anthony Aucher, 1st Baronet (1614–1692)
- Sir Anthony Aucher, 2nd Baronet (c. 1685–1695)
- Sir Hewitt Aucher, 3rd Baronet (c. 1687–1726)
