= Sir Thomas Hales, 2nd Baronet =

English politician

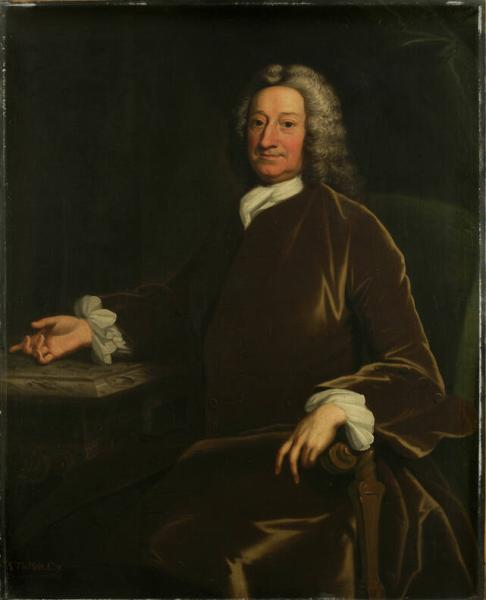
A portrait of Hales

Sir Thomas Hales, 2nd Baronet (24 February 1665/66 – 7 January 1748) was an English politician who sat in the English and British House of Commons between 1701 and 1747.

Hales was the eldest son of Thomas Hales of Howletts, Bekesbourne and his wife Mary Wood, daughter of Richard Wood of Abbots Langley, Hertfordshire.

He was baptised on 1 March 1665/66 at Saint Peter's, Bekesbourne, Kent, England

He was admitted at Inner Temple in 1683 and subsequently travelled abroad in France. His father died in 1692, and in December 1693, he inherited the baronetcy on the death of his grandfather Sir Robert Hales, who had been created a baronet at the Restoration.

Hales was returned as a Tory Member of Parliament for Kent at the first general election of 1701. He topped the poll in a contest at the second general election of 1701 and was returned unopposed at the 1702 English general election. He did not stand in 1705. He stood for Nottinghamshire at a by-election in June 1711, but was unsuccessful.

At the 1715 British general election Hales was returned as Whig MP for Canterbury and was then rewarded with an appointment to the commission for forfeited estates with a salary of £1,000 a year. He supported the Administration, except in 1719, when he voted against the Peerage Bill. He was re-elected for Canterbury in 1722 and 1727. Hales voted for the excise bill and at the 1734 British general election, he was defeated in the poll, but was returned on petition on 11 April 1735. He was defeated at the 1741 British general election and was not returned until a by-election on 23 January 1746. He was defeated at the 1747 general election and did not stand again.

Hales married Mary Pym (d. 1729), daughter of Sir Charles Pym, 1st Baronet of Brymore, in 1688, and their children included:

- Sir Thomas Hales (c. 1694–1762), who succeeded to the baronetcy
- Mary Hales, who married Sir Brook Bridges, 1st Baronet (d. 1728), of Goodneston
- Catherine Hales, who married Edward Cook of Canterbury
- Anne Hales
- Elizabeth Hales, who married (first) Benjamin Lethiemillier of East Shen and (second) Charles Pyott of St. Martin's

His younger brother Stephen Hales was a curate who became a scientist, inventor and philanthropist.

Parliament of England
Preceded by Sir James Oxenden; Sir Stephen Lennard	Member of Parliament for Kent; 1701–1705; With: Thomas Meredith 1701; William Campion 1701–1702; Sir Francis Leigh 1702–1705	Succeeded by Viscount Villiers; Sir Cholmeley Dering
Parliament of Great Britain
Preceded by John Hardres; Henry Lee	Member of Parliament for Canterbury; 1715–1734; With: John Hardres 1715–1722; Samuel Milles 1722–1727; Sir William Hardres 1727–1734	Succeeded by Sir William Hardres; Thomas May
Preceded by Sir William Hardres; Thomas May	Member of Parliament for Canterbury; 1735–1741; With: Thomas May	Succeeded by Hon. Thomas Watson; Thomas Best
Preceded by Thomas Best; Hon. Thomas Watson	Member of Parliament for Canterbury; 1746–1747; With: Thomas Best	Succeeded by Thomas Best; Matthew Robinson-Morris
Baronetage of England
Preceded by Robert Hales	Baronet (of Beakesbourne); 1693–1748	Succeeded by Thomas Hales
