= Hackington =

Area of Canterbury, Kent, England

Coordinates: 51.309°N 1.074°E

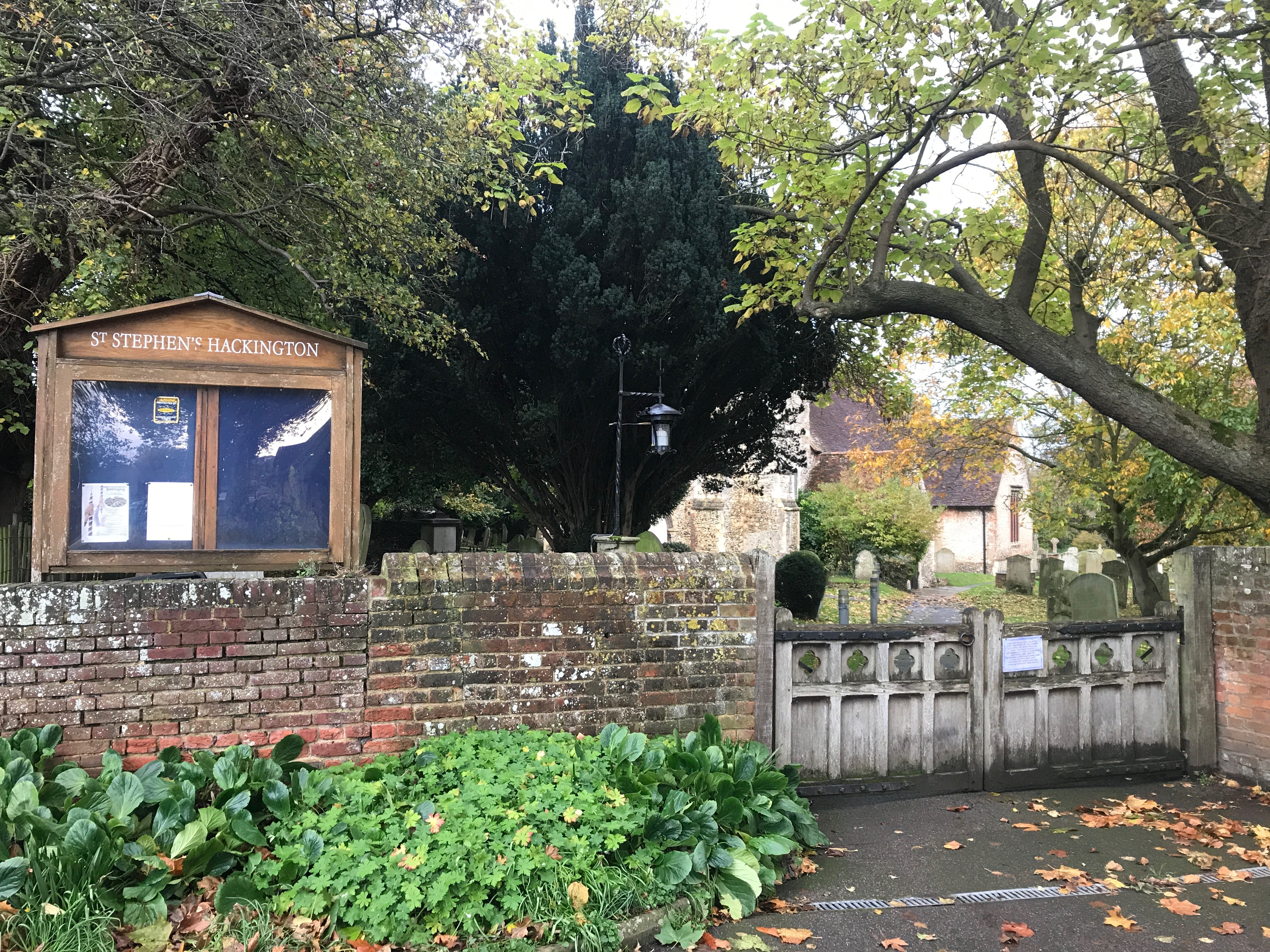
- St Stephen's Church, Hackington

- Location within Kent
- Area: 5.92 km^{2} (2.29 sq mi)
- Population: 587 (Civil Parish 2011)
  - Density: 99/km^{2} (260/sq mi)
- OS grid reference: TR143612
- Civil parish: Hackington
- District: City of Canterbury
- Shire county: Kent
- Region: South East
- Country: England
- Sovereign state: United Kingdom
- Post town: CANTERBURY
- Postcode district: CT2
- Dialling code: 01227
- Police: Kent
- Fire: Kent
- Ambulance: South East Coast
- UK Parliament: Canterbury

Hackington is an area of Canterbury in Kent, England, also known (especially historically) as St Stephen's, incorporating the northern part of the city, as well as a semi-rural area to the north.

It is an ancient ecclesiastical parish, with the parish church dedicated to St Stephen. It is also the name of a modern civil parish immediately north of Canterbury, the main community of which is Tyler Hill. The ecclesiastical and civil parishes overlap geographically, but are not identical.

The original village of Hackington was centred on a village green at the current day location of St Stephen's Church Hackington, the Manwood Almshouses, and Ye Olde Beverlie public house, a location still known as St Stephen's Green. Ye Olde Beverlie served as the clubhouse of the Berverley Cricket Club from its formation in 1835. The club changed its name in 1842 to become Kent County Cricket Club, now based at the St Lawrence Ground in Canterbury. The village of Hackington is today entirely subsumed into the northern suburbs of the city of Canterbury.

== Ecclesiastical parish ==
The church was built around 1050 AD, with the tower about a hundred years later, and the transepts in the 16th century by Sir Roger Manwood. The parish stretches right into the city centre (ending in the Westgate Ward) and is contiguous with the parish of St Dunstan to the south and the parish of Blean to the north. The church and parish are mentioned in the Domesday Book (1086) where the village is called Latintone, a name subsequently corrupted to Hackington.

A site here was projected in the 1180s by Archbishop Baldwin for a new college, which was to contain the archiepiscopal cathedra and stalls for the king and the bishops of the province of Canterbury, but the monks of Canterbury procured a veto for the scheme from Pope Innocent III.

The parish is still active, with a full time parish priest (rector), and is not held in plurality or united in a wider benefice. The population of the ecclesiastical parish (according to the Research & Statistics Unit of the Church of England in 2020) is 9,309 people living in 2,724 households.

== Civil parish ==
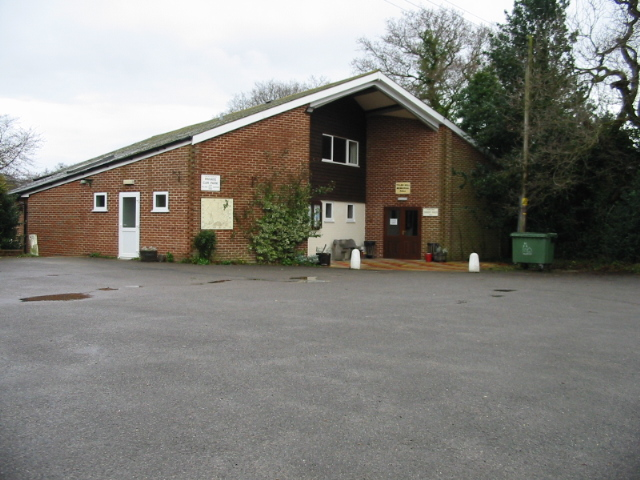
Tyler Hill community centre

The modern civil parish of Hackington does not include the ancient village centre of the same name, nor most of the original ecclesiastical parish, although there is an area of overlap north of Hales Place. The greatest part of the civil parish in further north, centred around the community of Tyler Hill, which is located in the ecclesiastical parish of Blean.

The population of the civil parish is much smaller than that of the ecclesiastical parish. It rose by more than 10 per cent between the census reports of 2001 and 2011, from 522 to 589.

== Hales Place ==
An early sixteenth-century house and estate, owned by the Archdeacon of Canterbury, and located in the parish of Hackington, fell into the hands of the Crown at the Reformation, and was given to Sir Roger Manwood. Manwood endowed the community's almshouses (still extant), and carried out extensions and repairs to the parish church of St Stephen, in which he is buried. The property later passed to the Culpepper family, and became known as St Stephen's House. In 1675 it was sold to Sir John Hales, who demolished the house and built a new one, known as Hales Place. A very few traces of the estate remain, but it is now largely developed as a residential housing estate, the original house having been demolished around 1930.

== Famous residents ==
- Sir Christopher Hales, eminent judge and Master of the Rolls, died at Hackington in 1541
- Sarah Dixon, poet, lived in the parish and died there on 23 April 1765.
- Sir Roger Manwood, jurist and Lord Chief Baron of the Exchequer, lived in the parish and endowed it greatly.
- Sir Edward Hales, 3rd Baronet, and assorted other members of the Hales family, resided at Hales Place.
