= Colin Campbell, 1st Baron Colgrain =

British Baron and banker (1866–1954)

Colin Frederick Campbell
- Colin Frederick Campbell
- Born: June 1866
- Died: November 1954 (aged 88)
- Occupation: Banker

Colin Frederick Campbell, 1st Baron Colgrain (13 June 1866 – 3 November 1954), was a Scottish banker.

== Early life ==
Campbell was born on 13 June 1866. He was the son of George William Campbell and Florence Hogg. He was educated at Eton College.

== Career ==
He was President of the British Bankers' Association from 1938 to 1946 and was also a Director of the National Provincial Bank and of London Assurance. On 28 January 1946 he was raised to the peerage as Baron Colgrain, of Everlands in the County of Kent.

== Personal life ==
On 9 May 1890, Campbell married Lady Angela Mary Alice, daughter of Henry Ryder, 4th Earl of Harrowby. Together, they were the parents of four children.

She died in 1939. Colgrain died in November 1954, aged 88, and was succeeded in the barony by his eldest son Donald.

Coat of arms of Colin Campbell, 1st Baron Colgrain
Crest A boar’s head erect and erased Azure issuing from a wreath of myrtle leaved and flowered Proper. Escutcheon Gyronny of eight Or and Sable on a chief Azure a bezant between two crescents of the first. Supporters On the dexter side a horse Argent and on the sinister side a boar Azure. Motto Fac Et Spera

== Notes ==
- Kidd, Charles, Williamson, David (editors). Debrett's Peerage and Baronetage (1990 edition). New York: St Martin's Press, 1990,
- Leigh Rayment's Peerage Pages

Peerage of the United Kingdom
New creation	Baron Colgrain; 1946–1954	Succeeded by Donald Swinton Campbell
