= William Jacob (Canterbury MP) =

English physician and politician

William Jacob (c. 1623 – early 1692) was an English physician and politician who sat in the House of Commons briefly in 1679.

Jacob was a physician at Canterbury and was the subject of a ghost story. In September 1652 he treated a Henry Jacob for gangrene but his patient died and was buried in All Saints' Church, Canterbury. Shortly afterwards Jacob was woken in his bed at night by the apparition of the deceased who "laid a cold hand on his face" and was recognisable by the distinctive cut of his beard. A maid also saw the apparition on another night. In 1670 Jacob rebuilt the Wincheap Gate in Canterbury, and was rewarded with a dinner paid for by the corporation.

In February 1679, Jacob was elected member of parliament (MP) for Canterbury and held the seat until August 1679.

Parliament of England
Preceded by Thomas Hardres; Edward Master	Member of Parliament for Canterbury; Feb-Aug 1679; With: Edward Hales	Succeeded by Edward Hales; Thomas Hardres
