= Baron Colgrain =

Barony in the Peerage of the United Kingdom

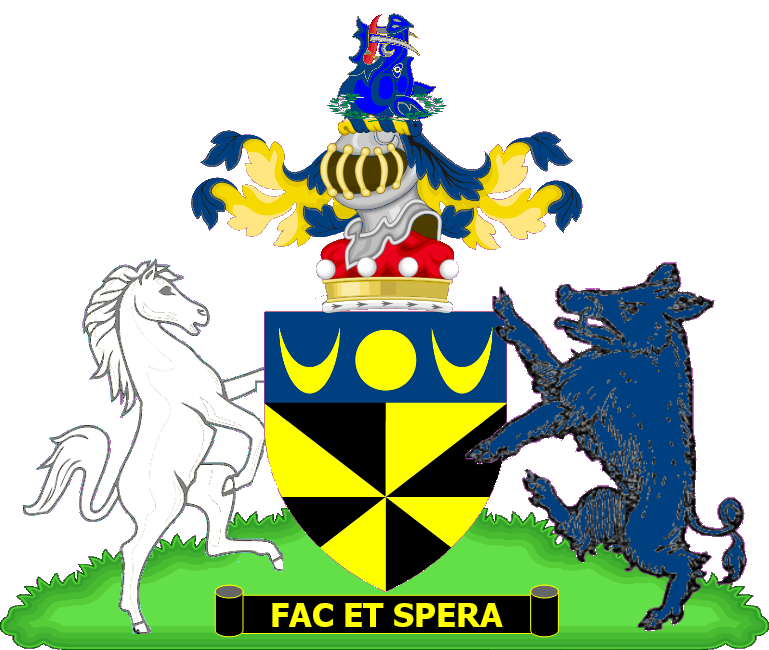
- Crest: A boar’s head erect and erased Azure issuing from a wreath of myrtle leaved and flowered Proper.
- Shield: Gyronny of eight Or and Sable on a chief Azure a bezant between two crescents of the first.
- Supporters: On the dexter side a horse Argent and on the sinister side a boar Azure.
- Motto: Fac Et Spera

Baron Colgrain, of Everlands in the County of Kent, is a title in the Peerage of the United Kingdom. It was created in 1946 for the Scottish banker Colin Campbell. He was President of the British Bankers' Association from 1938 to 1946. As of 2017 the title is held by his great-grandson, the fourth Baron, who succeeded his father in 2008. Since 2017 he has been one of the 92 hereditary peers chosen to remain in the House of Lords under the House of Lords Act 1999.

The family seat is Bushes Farm, near Sevenoaks, Kent.

== Barons Colgrain (1946) ==
- Colin Frederick Campbell, 1st Baron Colgrain (1866–1954)
- Donald Swinton Campbell, 2nd Baron Colgrain (1891–1973)
- David Colin Campbell, 3rd Baron Colgrain (1920–2008)
- Alastair Colin Leckie Campbell, 4th Baron Colgrain (b. 1951)

The heir apparent is the present holder's son, the Hon. Thomas Colin Donald Campbell (b. 1984).

== See also ==
- Carter-Campbell of Possil

== Notes ==
- Kidd, Charles, Williamson, David (editors). Debrett's Peerage and Baronetage (1990 edition). New York: St Martin's Press, 1990.
- Leigh Rayment's Peerage Pages
