= Hales baronets =

Extinct baronetcy in the Baronetage of England

Arms of Hales: Gules, three arrows or feathered and barbed argent

There were three baronetcies created for members of the Hales family, all were part of the Baronetage of England and are now extinct. The oldest was created in 1611 for Edward Hales. He was a member of a Kent family. The second was created in 1660 for Robert Hales, MP for Hythe 1659, also of a Kent family. The third was created in 1660 for John Hales of Coventry, co. Warwick.

== Hales of Woodchurch and Tunstall, Kent (1 February 1626; extinct) ==
Created in the Baronetage of England,

- Sir Edward Hales, 1st Baronet (1576–1654)
- Sir Edward Hales, 2nd Baronet (1626–1684)
- Sir Edward Hales, 3rd Baronet (1645–1695) A convert to Roman Catholicism, he was much in favour with James II, who appointed him to various Lieutenancies and positions of confidence. After the Revolution of 1688, he continued to attend James II at the exiled court in France at St. Germain-en-Laye and was a prominent member of the Catholic cabinet under the Duke of Melfort. Created in 1692, Earl of Tenterden, Viscount Tunstall and Baron Hales of Emley in the Jacobite Peerage of England by James II.
- Sir John Hales, 4th Baronet, 2nd Jacobite Earl of Tenterden (1672–1744). Hales was the second and eldest surviving son of Sir Edward Hales 3rd Baronet, and Frances Windebank (dau. of Sir Thomas Windebank (1582–1646) of Hougham, Lincolnshire, In 1718 Hales abandoned his Catholic faith and became an Anglican. He was offered a peerage by George I but declined it, because he would not be allowed to hold his claim to the earldom of Tenterden, conferred on his father by James II. Hales was granted the freedom of the city Canterbury after he installed a water supply in lead pipes at his own expense. In recognition of this gift, there was much festivity and many church bells were rung in his honour. In 1730, Hales gave an unusual one handed clock to St Stephen's church in Canterbury, which is still in use on the tower wall to this day. Hales married in 1695 Mary Catherine Bealing, daughter of Sir Richard Bealing. He then married Helen, (daughter of Dudley Bagnall, esq.) who died at Luckily, in Berkshire, in 1737. With Mary, he had Edward (the 5th Baronet), John (who died before him) and one daughter (Frances, who later married to George Henry, Earl of Litchfield). With Helen, he had three sons, James, Alexander, and Philip. He was buried in Tunstall on 20 January 1744.
- Sir Edward Hales, 5th Baronet, 3rd Jacobite Earl of Tenterden (1730–1802) He married in September 1747, first Barbara Mabella, daughter and heir of Sir John Webb, 3rd baronet she died in 1770, with whom he had one son 'Sir Edward Hales', esq.
- Sir Edward Hales, 6th Baronet, 4th Jacobite Earl of Tenterden (1758–1829) who married a daughter of Henry Darell, esq. of Calehill, and three daughters, Anne, Elizabeth, and Barbara. Then he married Mrs. Palmer, of Westminster, London, a widow. On his death the title became extinct. His heir was Edouard de Mourlaincourt, who changed his name to Edward Hales, the son of the youngest sister of the 6th Baronet.

== Hales of Beakesbourne, Kent (12 July 1660; extinct) ==
Created in the Baronetage of England, this is a senior branch to the Hales of Woodchurch.

- Sir Robert Hales, 1st Baronet (c. 1610 – December 1693) MP for Hythe 1659; his son Thomas Hales of Howlets died in his lifetime, and he was succeeded by his grandson:
- Sir Thomas Hales, 2nd Baronet (24 February 1666 – 7 January 1748) who succeeded his grandfather. He was MP for Kent 1701–1705 and Canterbury 1715–34, 1735–41 and 1746–47
- Sir Thomas Hales, 3rd Baronet (c. 1694 – 6 October 1762) an MP in various rotten boroughs; he was MP for Minehead 1722–27, Camelford 1727–1734, Grampound 1734–41, Hythe 1744–61 and as Sir Thomas Hales, Bart, he was MP for East Grinstead 1761–62
- Sir Thomas Pym Hales, 4th Baronet (c. 1726 – 18 March 1773) MP for Downton 1762–68 and Dover 1770–73; he had five daughters, of whom the youngest Caroline was mother of Philip Gore, 4th Earl of Arran, ancestor of all subsequent earls. He was therefore succeeded by his younger brother:
- Sir Philip Hales, 5th Baronet (c. 1735 – 12 April 1824) who left an only daughter.

== Hales of Coventry, Warwick (28 August 1660; extinct) ==
Created in the Baronetage of England, it became extinct with the successive deaths of three brothers in their early twenties. The family descends from a younger branch of Hales of Woodchurch (see above)

- Sir John Hales, 1st Baronet; succeeded by his elder son
- Sir Christopher Hales, 2nd Baronet (4 June 1670 – 7 January 1717); MP for Coventry 1698–1707 and 1711–15. He died unmarried, and was succeeded by his next brother
- Sir Edward Hales, 3rd Baronet (died. 3 September 1720) who married and had issue three sons and three daughters.
- Sir Christopher Hales, 4th Baronet (died 8 May 1766) who married Miss Harrington (or Harison Columbine (bur 03.06.1762) said to be daughter of Benjamin Columbine of Moreley, and had issue. His son
- Sir John Hales, 5th Baronet (c. 1743 – 15 February 1802) who married Anne Scott, and had three sons, who succeeded as baronets, and also five daughters.
- Sir John Scott Hales, 6th Baronet (17 November 1779 – 22 February 1803)
- Sir Samuel Hales, 7th Baronet (10 October 1782 – 22 January 1805)
- Sir Christopher Hales, 8th Baronet (24 August 1785 – 16 January 1806) with whom the baronetcy became extinct.

Baronetage of England
Preceded by Twysden baronets	Hales baronets 29 June 1611	Succeeded by Monins baronets
