= Thomas Hardres =

English barrister and politician

Thomas Hardres (1610–1681) was an English barrister and politician. He was the Member of Parliament for Canterbury, Kent from 1664.

== Life ==
He was descended from a family owning the manor of Broad Oak at Hardres, near Canterbury, and was fourth son of Sir Thomas Hardres and Eleanor, sole surviving daughter and heiress of Henry Thoresby of Thoresby, a master in chancery. Thomas became a member of Gray's Inn, and was called to the bar. From 1649 until his death he was steward of the manor of Lambeth.

In the vacation after Michaelmas term 1669 he became a serjeant-at-law, in 1675 was appointed King's Serjeant, and in 1679 was elected M.P. for Canterbury. He also received the honour of knighthood. In December 1681 he died, and was buried at Canterbury.

== Works ==
His Reports of Cases in the Exchequer, 1655–1670 was published in 1693.

== Family ==
He was twice married, first to Dorcas, daughter and heiress of George Bargrave, who died in 1643; and secondly to Philadelphia, daughter of one Franklyn of Maidstone, and widow of Peter Manwood.

Parliament of England
Preceded by Francis Lovelace; Edward Master	MP for Canterbury; 1664; With: Edward Master	Succeeded by Edward Hales; William Jacob
