= Lord Lieutenant of Kent =

People who have served as Lord-Lieutenant of Kent, England

This is a list of people who have served as Lord-Lieutenant of Kent. Since 1746, all Lords Lieutenant have also been Custos Rotulorum of Kent.

== Lords Lieutenant of Kent ==
- Sir Thomas Cheney 1551 – 1558
- William Brooke, 10th Baron Cobham 3 July 1585 – 6 March 1597
- Henry Brooke, 11th Baron Cobham 29 October 1597 – 24 March 1603
- Edward Wotton, 1st Baron Wotton 28 January 1604 – 31 May 1620
- George Villiers, 1st Marquess of Buckingham 31 May 1620 – 8 June 1620
- Ludovic Stuart, 2nd Duke of Lennox 8 June 1620 – 16 February 1624
- Philip Herbert, 4th Earl of Pembroke 20 March 1624 – 1642
- Interregnum
- Heneage Finch, 3rd Earl of Winchilsea 10 July 1660 – 16 January 1688 jointly with
- Thomas Wriothesley, 4th Earl of Southampton 16 July 1662 – 16 May 1667 and
- Charles Stewart, 3rd Duke of Richmond 13 May 1668 – 12 December 1672
- Christopher Roper, 5th Baron Teynham 16 January 1688 – 25 October 1688
- Louis de Duras, 2nd Earl of Feversham 25 October 1688 – 17 May 1689
- Heneage Finch, 3rd Earl of Winchilsea 17 May 1689 – 3 October 1689
- Henry Sydney, 1st Earl of Romney 3 October 1689 – 8 April 1704 jointly with
- Vere Fane, 4th Earl of Westmorland 18 April 1692 – 29 December 1693
- Charles Finch, 4th Earl of Winchilsea 2 May 1704 – 6 April 1705
- Lewis Watson, 1st Earl of Rockingham 6 April 1705 – 19 March 1724
- John Sidney, 6th Earl of Leicester 3 June 1724 – 27 September 1737
- Lewis Watson, 2nd Earl of Rockingham 17 November 1737 – 4 November 1745
- Thomas Watson, 3rd Earl of Rockingham January 1746 – 26 February 1746
- Lionel Sackville, 1st Duke of Dorset 8 July 1746 – 10 October 1765
- Charles Sackville, 2nd Duke of Dorset 17 December 1765 – 5 January 1769
- John Sackville, 3rd Duke of Dorset 27 January 1769 – 30 June 1797
- Charles Marsham, 1st Earl of Romney 30 June 1797 – 9 June 1808
- John Pratt, 1st Marquess Camden 9 June 1808 – 8 October 1840
- Henry Tufton, 11th Earl of Thanet 16 November 1840 – 19 October 1846
- George Cowper, 6th Earl Cowper 19 October 1846 – 15 April 1856
- John Townshend, 1st Earl Sydney 10 June 1856 – 14 February 1890
- Arthur Stanhope, 6th Earl Stanhope 18 March 1890 – 19 April 1905
- John Pratt, 4th Marquess Camden 5 June 1905 – 14 December 1943
- Wykeham Stanley Cornwallis, 2nd Baron Cornwallis 1 September 1944 – 1972
- Gavin Astor, 2nd Baron Astor of Hever 2 August 1972 – 2 August 1982
- Robert Leigh-Pemberton, Baron Kingsdown 2 August 1982 – 23 January 2002
- Allan Willett 23 January 2002 – 24 August 2011
- Philip Sidney, 2nd Viscount De L'Isle 1 September 2011 – 21 April 2020
- Annabel Campbell, Baroness Colgrain 22 April 2020 –

=== Deputy Lieutenants ===
- Sir Thomas Peyton, 2nd Baronet July 1660
- Ivo Francis Walter Bligh, 8th Earl of Darnley March 1901
- Sir John Furley March 1901
- Bill Cockcroft
- Kelvin Holford
- Jools Holland
- Sir Keith Speed
- John Astor, 3rd Baron Astor of Hever 1996
- Group Captain Patrick Tootal
- Colonel Michael Howard Seys-Phillips, April 1971
- Colonel Frederick Kenneth Theobald, April 1971
- Brigadier John Charles Holman, April 1996
- Brigadier David John Ralls
- Sir Ralph Oakden September 1852
