= Romney Sedgwick =

== Early life and education ==
Richard Romney Sedgwick (29 May 1894 – 20 January 1972) was a British historian, civil servant and diplomat. He was the elder son of Professor Adam Sedgwick, 1854–1913, the zoologist, and Laura Helen Elizabeth Robinson, the daughter of Captain Robinson, of Armagh. He married Mana St David Hodson, daughter of Professor T.C.Hodson, in 1936. They had one son, Adam, and one daughter, Sophia.

Sedgwick was educated at Westminster School and Trinity College, Cambridge. He became a Fellow of the college in 1919.

== Career ==
Sedgwick edited The History of Parliament volumes that covered the House of Commons during the years 1715–1754. His work and that of his collaborators demonstrated that the Whig and Tory parties survived Queen Anne's death in 1714 and continued to exist during the reigns of George I and George II.

Eveline Cruickshanks, in her work on the Tories and the Jacobite rising of 1745, paid tribute to Sedgwick: "My greatest debt is to the late Romney Sedgwick, a staunch Whig, whose wit and erudition I greatly admired, for a series of discussions, heated at times, but, as I well know, much enjoyed on both sides".

== Publications ==
=== Articles ===
- 1919. The Inner Cabinet from 1739 to 1741. English Historical Review. 34 (135). 290–302. https://www.jstor.org/stable/551069
- 1945. Sir Robert Walpole 1676–1745: The Minister for the House of Commons. Times Literary Supplement. 24 March. 133–134.
- 1950. Review of Horace Walpole's Correspondence. Edited by W.S. Lewis. Vols xiii and xiv. London: Cumberlege for Yale University Press. 1948. The English Historical Review. 65 (257). 524-526.
- 1953. Review of Horace Walpole's Correspondence. Edited by W.S. Lewis. Vols 15 and 16. London: Cumberlege for Yale University Press. 1952. The English Historical Review. 68 (269). 615-617.

=== Books ===
- 1931. John, Lord Hervey, Some Materials towards Memoirs of the Reign of King George II. (Editor, 3 volumes). London: Kings Printers.
- 1939. Letters from George III to Lord Bute 1756-1766. (Editor). London: Macmillan and Co.
- 1970. The History of Parliament: The House of Commons 1715–1754 Volume I Introductory Survey, Appendices, Constituencies Members A-D. New York: Oxford University Press.
- 1970. The History of Parliament: The House of Commons 1715–1754 Volume II Members E-Y. London: Her Majesty's Stationery Office.
