= Colfe =

Colfe may refer to:

- Colfe's School, Greenwich, England

== People with the surname ==
- Abraham Colfe (died 1657), English vicar
- Isaac Colfe (died 1597), English divine

== See also ==
- Colfer, a surname
