= List of mayors of Canterbury =

Canterbury was granted a city charter in 1448 which gave it the right to have a mayor and a sheriff. The city's web site records that

King Henry VI decreed that the City should be "of one Mayor and one commonalty, wholly corporate for ever". The first mayor elected under royal charter was John Lynde.

The responsibilities of mayors have diminished over the years. They were once in charge of keeping the peace, serving as chief magistrate and presiding over the local lawcourt. This caused problems as the mayor could be asked to chair sessions without experience or knowledge of law. The Justices of the Peace Act of 1968 decreed that mayors were no longer entitled to sit as magistrates by virtue of their office alone.

The dignity and title of lord mayor was granted on 13 July 1988 while the 12th Lambeth Conference of the Anglican Church was being held in the city.

A complete chronological list of bailiffs (1380–1447) and mayors (1448–1800) is given in Edward Hasted, The History and Topographical Survey of the County of Kent, vol. 12 (1801) pp. 603–611, available online from British History Online, page 63714.
Names not otherwise referenced in the list below are taken from this source.

== Mayors of Canterbury ==
=== 15th century ===
- 1448: John Lynde First mayor of Canterbury
- 1449: William Benet
- 1450: Gervas Clifton or Clyfton.
- 1451: Roger Rydle
- 1452: John Mullynge
- 1453: John Mullynge
- 1454: John Wynter (not to be confused with the 16th century explorer of the same name)
- 1455: William Bonnington
- 1456: Richard Prat
- 1457: Philip Belknap (deceased)
- 1457: William Bolde : notary; possibly a relative of Dom William Boolde [or Bolde], Benedictine monk at the Cathedral priory.
- 1458: Roger Rydle
- 1459: John Wynter
- 1460: Roger Rydle
- 1461: William Bygge
- 1462: John Frennyngham
- 1463: Thomas Forster
- 1464: William Sellowe
- 1465: Hamon Bele
- 1466: John Harnell
- 1467: William Bygge
- 1468: John Frennyngham
- 1469: Roger Rydle
- 1470–1471: Nicholas Faunt : publicly executed in the Buttermarket for High Treason
- 1471: Roger Brent
- 1472: Roger Brent
- 1473: John Bygge
- 1474: John Bygge
- 1475: John Whitlok
- 1476: Roger Brent
- 1477: Thomas Atwode
- 1478: Hamon Bele
- 1479: Thomas Atwode
- 1480: Thomas Atwode
- 1481: Richard Carpynter.
- 1482: Nicholas Sheldwich
- 1483: Nicholas Shelwich
- 1484: William Sellowe
- 1485: John Whitlok
- 1486: Thomas Atwode
- 1487: Stephen Barett
- 1488: William Ingram
- 1489: John Crysp
- 1490: John Carlille
- 1491: John Swan
- 1492: Thomas Propchaunt : Thomas Propchant, grocer, became a freeman of the City in 1463.
- 1493: Edward Bolney
- 1494: Edward Bonley
- 1495: Thomas Atwode
- 1496: Stephen Baret
- 1497: Henry Goseborne
- 1498: Thomas Sare
- 1499: John Plompton

=== 16th century ===
- 1500: William Atwode
- 1501: John Huett
- 1502: Henry Goseborne
- 1503: Thomas Sare
- 1504: Thomas Wode: MP for Canterbury, 1504,1510,1515 and 1529
- 1505: William Crump MP for Canterbury, 1510
- 1506: Henry Goseborne
- 1507: Ralf Brown
- 1508: John Nayler
- 1509: William Crump MP for Canterbury, 1510
- 1510: John Huett
- 1511: Roger Clark
- 1512: Thomas Wode: MP for Canterbury, 1504,1510,1515 and 1529
- 1513: John Broker
- 1514: Thomas Wainfleet : died in office. Replaced by Thomas Fokys :Wainfleet was MP for Canterbury, 1512.
- 1515: John Nayler
- 1516: Henry Goseborne
- 1517: Thomas Fookys
- 1518: William Rutlande
- 1519: John Broker
- 1520: John Bridges: MP for Canterbury,1523, 1529 and 1536
- 1521: Roger Clark
- 1522: William Nutt
- 1523: Thomas Beale
- 1524: John Bridges: MP for Canterbury,1523, 1529 and 1536
- 1525: John Alcock
- 1526: Roger Clark
- 1527: James Whitals
- 1528: William Rutlande
- 1529: Robert Lewys : MP for Canterbury, 1539 and 1545
- 1530: Thomas Wode: MP for Canterbury, 1504,1510,1515 and 1529
- 1531: John Alcock
- 1532: Thomas Beal
- 1534:John Bridges: MP for Canterbury,1523, 1529 and 1536
- 1535: John Alcock
- 1536: Robert Lewez : MP for Canterbury, 1539 and 1545
- 1537: Roger Clarke
- 1538: John Starky : MP for Canterbury, 1539
- 1539: Thomas Bele
- 1540: Robert Lewes : MP for Canterbury, 1539 and 1545
- 1541: William Copyn : MP for Canterbury, 1553 and 1554
- 1542: Thomas Gower
- 1543: John Freeman
- 1544: John Alcock
- 1545: John Frenche
- 1546: Thomas Bathcost
- 1547: George Webbe :MP for Canterbury, 1553
- 1548: Gregory Rande
- 1549: John Freeman
- 1550: Robert Lewys : MP for Canterbury, 1539 and 1545
- 1551: William Copyn : MP for Canterbury, 1553 and 1554
- 1552: George Webbe : MP for Canterbury, 1553
- 1553: John Twyne : headmaster of the newly reconstituted King's School in 1542, MP for Canterbury, 1553 and 1554.
- 1554: Thomas Frenche
- 1555: Edward Carpenter
- 1556: John Fuller
- 1557: George Maye : MP for Canterbury, 1559
- 1558: Stephen Sare
- 1559: John Fuller
- 1560: Henry Aldey
- 1561: Richard Furner
- 1562: Richard Railton
- 1563: Thomas Percy
- 1564: Thomas Giles
- 1565: George Maye : MP for Canterbury, 1559
- 1566: William Fysher
- 1567: James Nethersole
- 1568: Peter Kelsham
- 1569: John Semarke
- 1570: James Drayton
- 1571: Anthony Webbe : MP for Canterbury, 1572
- 1572: James Nethersole : deposed by order of Queen Elizabeth I for forgery. Replaced by William Fisher
- 1573: Simon Brome : MP for Canterbury, 1584, 1586 and 1589
- 1574: John Rose : MP for Canterbury, 1584 and 1586
- 1575: Peter Kelsham
- 1576: Simon Brome : MP for Canterbury, 1584, 1586 and 1589
- 1577: Thomas Lymiter
- 1578: Clement Bassock
- 1579: James Nethersole
- 1580: Leonard Cotton
- 1581: Richard Gaunt
- 1582: John Nutt
- 1583: John Rose : MP for Canterbury, 1584 and 1586
- 1584: Ralph Bawden
- 1585: John Eastey
- 1586: Gilbert Penny
- 1587: Simon Brome: MP for Canterbury, 1584, 1586 and 1589
- 1588: Adrian Nycholls
- 1589: Bartholomew Brome : MP for Canterbury, 1589
- 1590: Edward Nethersole : married the widow of Richard Hooker (1554–1600).
- 1591: Christopher Leeds
- 1592: Marks Berry
- 1593: William Amie
- 1594: Thomas Long
- 1595: Thomas Hovenden
- 1596: James Frencham
- 1597: William Clarck
- 1598: Charles Wetenhall
- 1599: Robert Wynne (Woollen draper)

=== 17th century ===
- 1600: Warham Jemmett
- 1601: Simon Brome: MP for Canterbury, 1584, 1586 and 1589
- 1602: Richard Gaunt
- 1603: Ralph Bawden
- 1604: Edward Nethersole
- 1605: Sir Peter Manwood, (1571–1625) : judge and antiquary
- 1605: Mark Berry
- 1606: Thomas Hovenden
- 1607: Thomas Paramore
- 1608: William Watmer
- 1609: George Clagett : three times Mayor of Canterbury, namely, in 1609, 1622, and in 1632. His son was Nicholas Clagett the elder.
- 1610: Thomas Halke
- 1611: Joseph Colfe : brother of Rev. Isaac Colfe, Six Preacher of Canterbury Cathedral.
- 1612: Thomas Featherston
- 1613: George Elvwin
- 1614: John Peeres
- 1615: John Watson
- 1616: Markes Berrey
- 1617: Thomas Hovenden
- 1618: Avery Sabine
- 1619: Henry Vanner
- 1620: Ralph Hawkins
- 1621: John Hunt
- 1622: George Clagett
- 1623: Richard Lockley
- 1624: James Master
- 1625: William Whiting
- 1626: John Stanly
- 1627: John Furser
- 1628: John Roberts
- 1629: William Watmer
- 1630: Avery Sabyn
- 1631: John Meryam
- 1632: George Clagett
- 1633: John Lade
- 1634: Walter Southwell
- 1635: James Nicholson
- 1636: William Bridge
- 1637: John Terry
- 1638: James Master
- 1639: John Stanley
- 1640: Daniel Masterson
- 1641: Clive Carter
- 1642: John Watson : died in office. Replaced by Daniel Masterson
- 1643: George Nott : election declared void by the House of Commons. Replaced by John Lade
- 1644: John Pollen
- 1645: Avery Sabyn
- 1646: Paul Pettit
- 1647: William Bridge
- 1648: Michael Page
- 1649: William Reeve
- 1650: Thomas Tresser
- 1651: William Whitinge
- 1652: John Lee
- 1653: William Stanley
- 1654: Henry Knight
- 1655: Henry Twyman
- 1656: Richard May
- 1657: Zachary Lee
- 1658: Thomas Ockman
- 1659: Squire Beverton
- 1660: William Turner
- 1661: George Milles
- 1662: Henry Twyman
- 1663: William Stanley
- 1664: Avery Hilles
- 1665: Thomas Ockman
- 1666: Leonard Browne
- 1667: John Simpson
- 1668: Francis Maplisden
- 1669: Nicholas Burges
- 1670: Thomas Elwyn
- 1671: Thomas Fidge : haberdasher, son of Thomas Fidge, mercer; obtained freedom of the City in 1647.
- 1672: William Gilham
- 1673: Thomas Knowler
- 1674: Thomas Enfield
- 1675: John Lott
- 1676: Geo. Stanley: died in office. Replaced by Avery Hiles
- 1677: John Munn: died in office. Replaced by John Lott
- 1678: Nicholas Nicholson
- 1679: Thomas Dunkin
- 1680: John Garlin
- 1681: Jacob Wraight : son-in-law of John Durant [or Durance], Independent minister in Canterbury.
- 1682: William Gilbert
- 1683: Squier Beverton
- 1684: William Rooke
- 1685: Sir William Honywood, 2nd Baronet
- 1686: Thomas Knowler
- 1687: Henry Lee : discharged from the office of Mayor by order of King James II. Later, M.P. for Canterbury. Replaced by John Kingsford.
- 1688: John Kingsford, replaced by Henry Gibbs
- 1689: Francis Jeoffry
- 1690: Henry Waddell
- 1691: John Beane
- 1692: Matthias Gray : grocer and amateur naturalist, brother of Stephen Gray (1666–1736), 'experimental philosopher'.
- 1693: Nicholas Nicholson
- 1694: John Brickenden
- 1695: John Garlin
- 1696: Henry Waddell
- 1697: Squier Beverton
- 1698: Joseph Webb
- 1699: Francis Jeoffery

=== 18th century ===
- 1700: Matthias Gray
- 1701: John Beane
- 1702: Anthony Oughton
- 1703: Joseph Webb: died in office. Replaced by John Beane
- 1704: George Hall
- 1705: William Pysinge
- 1706: Henry Gibbs
- 1707: John Beaumont
- 1708: William Botting
- 1709: Edward Feudall
- 1710: John Wilson: died in office. Replaced by Edward Feudall
- 1711: Thomas Blunden
- 1712: Moses Agar
- 1713: Nicholas Fowle
- 1714: Thomas Beane
- 1715: Daniel Hall
- 1716: Valentine Jeken
- 1717: Lawrence Bridger
- 1718: Nicholas Fowle
- 1719: Lawrence Bridger
- 1720: Richard Picard
- 1721: Moses Agar
- 1722: Daniel Hall
- 1723: Valentine Jeken
- 1724: Thomas Bullock
- 1725: Thomas Shindler
- 1726: Thomas Gray
- 1727: Edward Jacob (d. 1756) : surgeon and alderman; father of Edward Jacob (1713–1788), antiquary and naturalist.
- 1728: Richard Pembrooke
- 1729: William Botting
- 1730: Anthony Oughton
- 1731: Thomas Bullock
- 1732: Charles Knowler
- 1733: William Browning
- 1734: Thomas Shindler
- 1735: Thomas Gray
- 1736: John Castle
- 1737: Thomas Davis
- 1738: William Carter
- 1739: John Robinson
- 1740: William Browning
- 1741: Thomas Davis
- 1742: John Tolputt
- 1743: John Watts
- 1744: Mark Thomas
- 1745: John Castle
- 1746: James Tonge
- 1747: John Watts
- 1748: William Gray
- 1749: John Tolputt
- 1750: James Tonge
- 1751: William Cooke
- 1752: John Robinson
- 1753: Edward Hayward
- 1754: John Tolputt
- 1755: William Pembrooke
- 1756: John Lade
- 1757: John Byng
- 1758: George Plomer
- 1759: George Knowler
- 1760: William Gray
- 1761: John Lade
- 1762: Wm. Pembrooke
- 1763: George Knowler
- 1764: James Avery
- 1765: John Byng
- 1766: George Stringer
- 1767: Thomas Parker
- 1768: Joseph Royle
- 1769: William Long
- 1770: John Cantis
- 1771: Thomas Smith
- 1772: John Taddy : died in office. Replaced by George Gipps : banker.
- 1775: John Jackson (1710–1795) : two times mayor of Canterbury; a wealthy brewer and farmer.
- 1776: James Simmons : newspaper proprietor, banker, businessman and M.P. for Canterbury.
- 1777: John Denne
- 1778: Stephen Richards
- 1779: Thomas Elwyn
- 1780: William Long
- 1781: Thomas Hammond
- 1782: Richard Harris Barham
- 1783: Joseph Royle
- 1784: George Frend
- 1785: Richard Halford
- 1786: Thomas Smith
- 1787: John Jackson
- 1788: James Simmons : second term
- 1789: Cyprian Rondeau Bunce
- 1790: Joseph Royle
- 1791: Thomas Delasaux
- 1792: Richard Staines
- 1793: Richard Frend
- 1794: John Hodges
- 1795: William Bristow
- 1796: Thomas Clowes : died in office. Replaced by Thomas Parker
- 1797: John Southee
- 1798: Matthew W Sankey
- 1799: Joseph Royle

=== 19th century ===
- 1800: Thomas Edward Salmon
- 1801: Thomas DeLassaux
- 1802: William Nutt
- 1803: Richard Frend
- 1804: John Cooper
- 1805: Henry Tritton
- 1806: John Southee
- 1807: James Sladden Browne
- 1808: Mawer Cowtan
- 1809: Thomas Parker : died in office and replaced by James Warren
- 1810: Charles Pout
- 1811: James Warren
- 1812: Matthew William Sankey
- 1813: John James Peirce
- 1814: William Jones
- 1815: John Cooper
- 1816: James Sladden Browne
- 1817: Charles Pout
- 1818: Mawer Cowtan
- 1819: George Frend
- 1820: James Warren
- 1821: William Homersham
- 1822: John Cooper
- 1823: Henry Cooper
- 1824: Osborne Snoulten
- 1825: John James Pierce
- 1826: George Frend
- 1827: William Homersham
- 1828: Osborne Snoulten
- 1829: Edward Kingsford
- 1830: Henry Cooper
- 1831: John Brent
- 1832: Sampson Kingsford
- 1833: Richard Frend
- 1834: John Partridge
- 1836: (Jan-Nov): G Neame
- 1836: Edward Plummer
- 1837: Edward Plummer
- 1838: Henry Cooper
- 1839: William Plummer
- 1840: William Masters : nurseryman and hybridizer of plants; founder of the Canterbury Museum in 1823.
- 1841: William Bowman
- 1842: William Plummer
- 1843: George Neame
- 1844: John Brent
- 1845: Henry Cooper
- 1846: Charles Brock
- 1847: William Plummer
- 1848: Thomas Wilkinson
- 1849: John Brent
- 1850: George Furley
- 1851: George Neame
- 1852: William James Cooper
- 1853: William Plummer
- 1854: David Matthews
- 1855: Henry Cooper
- 1856: William Brock
- 1857: Thomas N Wightwick
- 1858: Robert Sankey
- 1859: Thomas N Wightwick
- 1860: Edward Holttum
- 1861: Robert Sankey
- 1862: Thomas N Wightwick
- 1863–1865: Peter Marten (3 years)
- 1866: Thomas Sankey Cooper
- 1867: Harry George Austin
- 1868: William James Cooper
- 1869–1870: Henry Hart (2 years): pawnbroker
- 1871: William Henry Linom
- 1872: Harry George Austin
- 1873: George Harrison
- 1874: John W Z Wright
- 1875: Thomas Sankey Cooper
- 1876: William Henry Linom
- 1877: Thomas Lambert
- 1878: Charles Goulden
- 1879: John Hemery
- 1880: James Coppin
- 1881: George Royle Frend
- 1882: Alfred James Beer
- 1883: Henry Bell Wilson
- 1884: James Coppin
- 1885: William Robert Young
- 1886: Samuel Prentice
- 1887: William Mount
- 1888: Samuel Prentice
- 1889–1890: William Watson Mason (2 years)
- 1891–1892: William Mount (2 years)
- 1893–1894: George Collard (2 years)
- 1895: Samuel Hill Dean
- 1896–1899: George Collard (4 years)

=== 20th century ===
- 1900: Henry Hart : pawnbroker
- 1901–1902: George Collard (2 years) (knighted)
- 1903–1904: Sir George Collard (2 years)
- 1905–1910: Francis Bennett-Goldney : MP for Canterbury, 1910
- 1911: Frederick J Godden
- 1912–1913: George Mount (2 years)
- 1914: Frederick J Godden : died and replaced by Ramsey Allan Bremner
- 1915–1918: Ramsay Allan Bremner (4 years)
- 1919: Herbert Grigg James
- 1920–1922: Wright Hunt (3 years)
- 1923–1926: George Pope (3 years)
- 1927: George Robert Barrett
- 1928: William Vansittart Howard
- 1929–1930: Stanley Gordon Francis (2 years)
- 1931–1932: Frank Hooker (2 years)
- 1933–1934: Frank Wood (2 years)
- 1935: Frederick Charles Lefevre
- 1936: Frank Wood : died in office. Replaced by Frederick Charles Lefevre
- 1937: Herbert Harrison
- 1938–1939: Catherine Williamson (2 years) : the first woman Mayor of Canterbury.
- 1940–1944: Frederick Charles Lefevre
- 1945: Alfred Baynton
- 1946–1948: Evelyn Mary Hews (3+ years)
- 1949–1951: Stanley Herbert Jennings (3 years) (election moved to May)
- 1952: John Robert Barrett
- 1953–1954: Harold Pullen Dawton (2 years)
- 1955 : Thomas Edward Carling
- 1956–1958: William Stephen Bean (3 years)
- 1959–1960: Thomas McCallum (2 years)
- 1961: Arthur Vivian Wilson
- 1962: Clive Frederick Pare
- 1963–1965: Ernest Edward Kingsman (3 years)
- 1966–1967: Bernard Augustine Porter (2 years)
- 1968–1969: Herbert J. Buckworth (2 years)
- 1970–1971: John Tilleard (2 years)
- 1972: Herbert Joseph Buckworth
- 1973: Henrietta Barber : the last Mayor of the old Corporation of Canterbury.
- 1974: Thomas Castle : the first Mayor of the new enlarged Canterbury City Council.
- 1974: Thomas Edwin Castle
- 1975: Henry James Alexander
- 1976: Ian Fowler
- 1977: Margaret Mary Scott-Knight
- 1978: Clarence Richard Peard
- 1979: Edmond Robin Carver
- 1980: Bernard Augustine Porter
- 1981: William Arthur Wildman
- 1982: Arthur Gordon Porter
- 1983: Bernard A. Collins
- 1984: Cyril Leslie Windsor
- 1985: Hazel McCabe
- 1986: Owen P. Baker
- 1987: Frank Ian Nicholls
- 1988: Thomas Steele

== Lord Mayors of Canterbury ==
- 1988: Thomas Steele : the first lord mayor of Canterbury
- 1989: Arthur Gordon Porter
- 1990: Jim Nock
- 1991: John Purchese
- 1992: Patrick B M Burke
- 1993: Richard Henry Ruston
- 1994: William J. Hornsby
- 1995: David Pentin
- 1996: Clive Wake
- 1997: Denis Lynfoot
- 1998: Peter Wales
- 1999–2001 : Jennifer Samper
- 2001: Frederick Whitemore
- 2002: Mary Jeffries
- 2003: Nicholas Eden-Green
- 2004: Martin Vye
- 2005: Marion Attwood
- 2006: Pat Todd
- 2007: Cyril Windsor
- 2008: Carolyn Parry
- 2009: Harry Cragg
- 2010: Pat Todd
- 2011: Ian Thomas
- 2012: Robert Waters
- 2013: Heather Taylor
- 2014: Ann Taylor
- 2015: Sally Waters
- 2016: George Metcalfe
- 2017: Rosemary Doyle
- 2018: Colin Spooner
- 2019: Terry Westgate
- 2020: Pat Todd
- 2021: Pat Todd
- 2022: Anne Dekker
- 2023: Jean Butcher
- 2024: Jean Butcher
- 2025: Keji Moses

== See also ==
- Sheriff of Canterbury
