= Abri (disambiguation) =

Abri is a rock shelter.

Abri may also refer to:

- Abri, Sudan, a small town in northern Sudan
- Abri (tribe)

ABRI may refer to:

- Architecture and Building Research Institute, a research institute in Taiwan
- Armed Forces of the Republic of Indonesia, the armed forces of Indonesia (1962-1999)

== See also ==
- James Abree, an 18th-century English printer, publisher, and bookseller
- Avri, a given name
- Abris, an early Christian saint
