= Charles Robinson (MP) =

English lawyer and politician

Charles Robinson (c. 1732 – 31 March 1807) was an English lawyer and politician who sat in the House of Commons from 1780 to 1790.

Robinson was the son of Matthew Robinson of Edgeley, Yorkshire and his wife Elizabeth Drake. He served in the Royal Navy as a boy but then went into the law. He entered Middle Temple in 1749 and was called to the bar in 1753. In 1763 he became Recorder of Canterbury, in 1766 Recorder of Hythe, New Romney and Sandwich and in 1770 Recorder of Dover. He was also a bankruptcy commissioner from 1766 to 1792.

In 1780 Robinson was elected in a contest as Member of Parliament (MP) for Canterbury and held the seat until 1790 when he decided not to stand.

Robinson married Mary Dawkins, widow of Richard Dawkins of Maxton and daughter of John Greenland. Through her he acquired the estate at Maxton

Parliament of Great Britain
Preceded by Richard Milles; Sir William Mayne	Member of Parliament for Canterbury; 1780–1790; With: George Gipps	Succeeded by George Gipps; Sir John Honywood, Bt
