= Thomas Wainfleet =

16th-century English politician

Thomas Wainfleet (by 1463 – 1515), of Canterbury, Kent, was an English politician.

== Family ==
Wainfleet was the son of Thomas Wainfleet of Canterbury. He was unmarried, but had an illegitimate son.

== Career ==
Active in local politics, he was a common councilman for Canterbury by 1500, an alderman by 1504 and mayor for 1514–15. In 1512, he was elected a member of parliament for Canterbury.

Parliament of England
Preceded by William Crump with Thomas Atwode	Member of Parliament for Canterbury; 1512; With: John Hales I	Succeeded by Thomas Atwode with John Hales I
