= John Starkey =

John Starkey may refer to:

- John Starkey (Canterbury MP) (by 1503 – 1554), Member of Parliament for Canterbury, England, in 1539
- John Starkey (publisher), active in London in the second half of the 17th century
- John Starkey (North Carolina), North Carolina State Treasurer 1750–1765
- Sir John Starkey, 1st Baronet (1859–1940), British Conservative Party politician

== See also ==
- John Starkie (1830–1888), British Conservative Party politician
