= Twyne =

Twyne is a surname. Notable people with the surname include:

- Brian Twyne (1581–1644), English archivist
- John Twyne (1505–1581), English writer and politician
