= William Crump (MP) =

16th-century English politician

William Crump or Crompe (born by 1479 – 1516 or later), of Canterbury, Kent, was an English politician.

== Career ==
Crump was a common councilman of Canterbury by 1500, chamberlain in 1503–1505, an alderman by 1505 and Mayor of Canterbury for 1505–06 and 1509–10. He was elected a member of parliament for Canterbury, Kent in 1510.

Parliament of England
Preceded by John Crysp	Member of Parliament for Canterbury; 1510; With: Thomas Atwode	Succeeded by Thomas Wainfleet with John Hales I
