= Richard Madox (disambiguation) =

Richard Madox was an English explorer.

Richard Mad(d)ox or Maddocks may also refer to:

- Richard Madox Bromley, civil servant
- Richard Leach Maddox, photographer and physician
- Richard Maddocks, Australian cricketer
- Rick Maddocks, Canadian author
