= Crompe =

Crompe is a surname. Notable people with the surname include:

- Geoffrey Crompe, List of Lord Mayors of Dublin
- Ricardus Crompe, MP for Lewes (UK Parliament constituency)
- William Crompe, MP for Canterbury
