= John Baker (MP for Canterbury) =

English Whig politician (died 1831)

John Baker (c. 1754 - 20 January 1831) was an English Whig politician who sat in the House of Commons of Great Britain and of the United Kingdom in 1796 and 1797 and from 1802 to 1818.

Baker was the son of George Baker, a surgeon and medical practitioner of Canterbury. The family had long lived in Canterbury. His father left him a considerable fortune which he enlarged by marriage. He lived at Hawkhurst Lodge, in the Weald of Kent, and became one of the largest hop-planters in the district. Later he established the Union Bank at Canterbury and moved to St Stephen's, near there. He became active in local politics and was Sheriff of Canterbury for 1786–87.

In 1796, Baker was elected Member of Parliament for Canterbury on what was called the independent interest. He headed the poll with 774 votes but the election was declared void on petition under the provisions of the Treating Act. At the second election in March 1797 he again had a majority of votes, "although not one public-house had been opened in their interest, nor a single cockade distributed". However a protest was entered against the eligibility of the two elected MPs and the sitting members were re-instated.

In 1802 Baker was elected MP for Canterbury without opposition. He was returned again at the general elections of 1806, 1807, and 1812, and retired at that of 1818. In politics he was always a consistent Whig. He was also appointed lieutenant-colonel of the Canterbury volunteers in 1803.

Baker died at Canterbury, aged 76. He was considered one of the best gentlemen billiard players in the county and excelled even more at whist.

Baker married Jane Tattershall, eldest daughter of the Rev. James Tattersall, Rector of St Paul's, Covent Garden. He had two sons and two daughters. His son George was a barrister and Recorder of Canterbury.

Parliament of Great Britain
Preceded by George Gipps; Sir John Honywood, Bt	Member of Parliament for Canterbury; 1796–March 1797; With: Samuel Elias Sawbridge	Succeeded by Election declared void 2 Mar 1797
Preceded by Election declared void 2 Mar 1797	Member of Parliament for Canterbury; March–May 1797; With: Samuel Elias Sawbridge	Succeeded by Sir John Honywood, Bt; George Gipps
Parliament of the United Kingdom
Preceded by Sir John Honywood, Bt; George Watson	Member of Parliament for Canterbury; 1802–1818; With: George Watson 1802–1806; James Simmons 1806-Feb 1807; Samuel Elias Sawbridge Feb-May 1807; Edward Taylor 1807–1812; Stephen Rumbold Lushington 1812–1818	Succeeded by Lord Clifton; Stephen Rumbold Lushington
