= John Hales (died 1540) =

Member of the Parliament of England

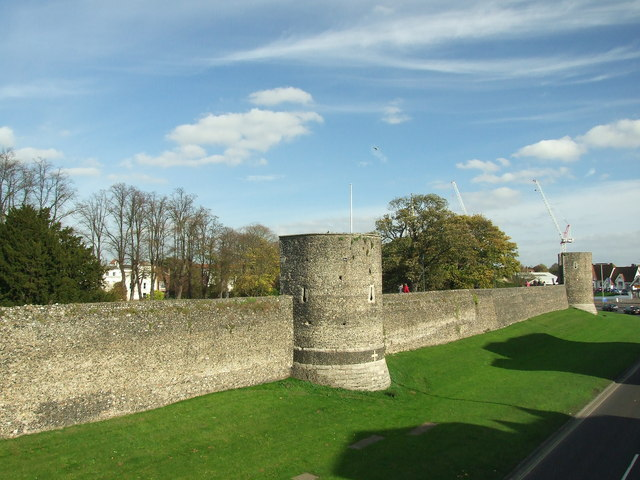
- Canterbury city walls, just outside which John Hales' manor of The Dungeon was situated
- Born: by 1470
- Died: after 20 July 1540
- Spouse: Isabel Harry
- Children: Sir James Hales; Thomas Hales; Edward Hales; William Hales; Mildred Hales
- Parent(s): John Hales mother's name unknown

Arms of Hales: Gules, three arrows or feathered and barbed argent

John Hales (by 1470 – 1540), of The Dungeon in the parish of St. Mary Bredin, Canterbury, Kent, was an administrator, politician and judge who was appointed a Baron of the Exchequer in 1522.

== Origins ==
He was born before 1470, a son of John Hales, of Tenterden in Kent. His mother's name is not recorded. His grandfather was Henry Hales, of Hales Place at Halden in Tenterden, who married Juliana Capell, a daughter of Richard Capell of Lenden in Tenterden. His great-uncle Thomas Hales was the father of the judge Sir Christopher Hales, Master of the Rolls.

== Career ==
Probably admitted to legal studies at Gray's Inn about 1490, by 1501 he had been appointed steward of the Priory of Christ Church at Canterbury. In 1503 he was made a justice of the peace for Kent, and in 1504 was appointed counsel to the corporation of Rye, and was also elected bailiff of his home town of Tenterden. From 1508, he was appointed to various royal commissions in his native Kent, in Middlesex and Sussex, and across the Channel in the English possessions of Calais and Guînes. By 1509 he had residences at both Canterbury, where he had acquired the manor known as The Dungeon just outside the city walls, and at Nackington.

In 1512 and again in 1515 he was elected a member of parliament for Canterbury, and was also retained as counsel to the corporation of Canterbury. In addition to legal work for the city, he was also employed in drafting legislation for the government. He became a Bencher of Gray's Inn in 1514, giving lectures in that year and in 1520.

His further advancement was probably the result of patronage by Sir Henry Guildford, the Comptroller of the Household, In 1519 he was appointed Attorney-General to the Duchy of Lancaster, in about 1520 steward of St Augustine's Abbey, and in 1521 general surveyor of Crown lands. He retained the last, but gave up the Duchy post when he was appointed third Baron of the Exchequer in 1522. To this was added the responsibility of justice of the peace for Middlesex and Sussex in 1524. As a judge, he was no longer eligible for parliament and in 1523 his seat was taken by his cousin Sir Christopher. After six years in that office, he was appointed second Baron in 1528 but was passed over for Chief Baron the following year.

He retired from his judicial position in November 1539 and made his will on 20 July 1540, asking to be buried beside his wife in his parish church of St Mary Bredin at Canterbury. His will bequeathed gold coins to his four surviving sons, his best gold ring to his cousin Sir Christopher, and a gold ring to his daughter Mildred. He must have died shortly after, but no date survives.

== Family ==
By 1509 he was married to Isabel, daughter and coheiress of Stephen Harry and his wife Isabel, daughter and heiress of William Brooker. They had four sons and a daughter:

James, of The Dungeon.
Thomas, of Thanington.
Edward, of Tenterden, who married Margaret, the daughter of John Honywood, of Sene in Hythe, and was the grandfather of Sir Edward Hales, 1st Baronet.
William, of Nackington.
Mildred, who married as his first wife John Honywood of Sene in Hythe.

Parliament of England
Preceded by William Crump with Thomas Atwode	Member of Parliament for Canterbury; 1512 and 1515; With: Thomas Wainfleet (1512) with Thomas Atwode (1515)	Succeeded by Christopher Hales with John Bridges
