= George Watson (MP) =

British politician

George Watson (20 February 1768 – 17 June 1824) was a British Member of Parliament.

He was the son of Lewis Watson, 1st Baron Sondes of Lees Court, Kent and his wife Grace, the daughter and coheiress of Hon. Henry Pelham of Esher Place, Surrey (later the Prime Minister) and educated at Eton College (1780–85).

He was MP for Canterbury from 1800 to 1806 and appointed High Sheriff of Rutland for 1811–12.

He died unmarried aged 56. He was buried at Rockingham, Northamptonshire.

Parliament of Great Britain
Preceded by Sir John Honywood, Bt; George Gipps	Member of Parliament for Canterbury; 1800; With: Sir John Honywood, Bt	Succeeded by Parliament of the United Kingdom
Parliament of the United Kingdom
Preceded by Parliament of Great Britain	Member of Parliament for Canterbury; 1801–1806; With: Sir John Honywood, Bt 1801–1802; John Baker 1802–1806	Succeeded by John Baker; James Simmons
