= James Hales (died 1589) =

English soldier (d. 1589)

Arms of Hales: Gules, three arrows or feathered and barbed argent

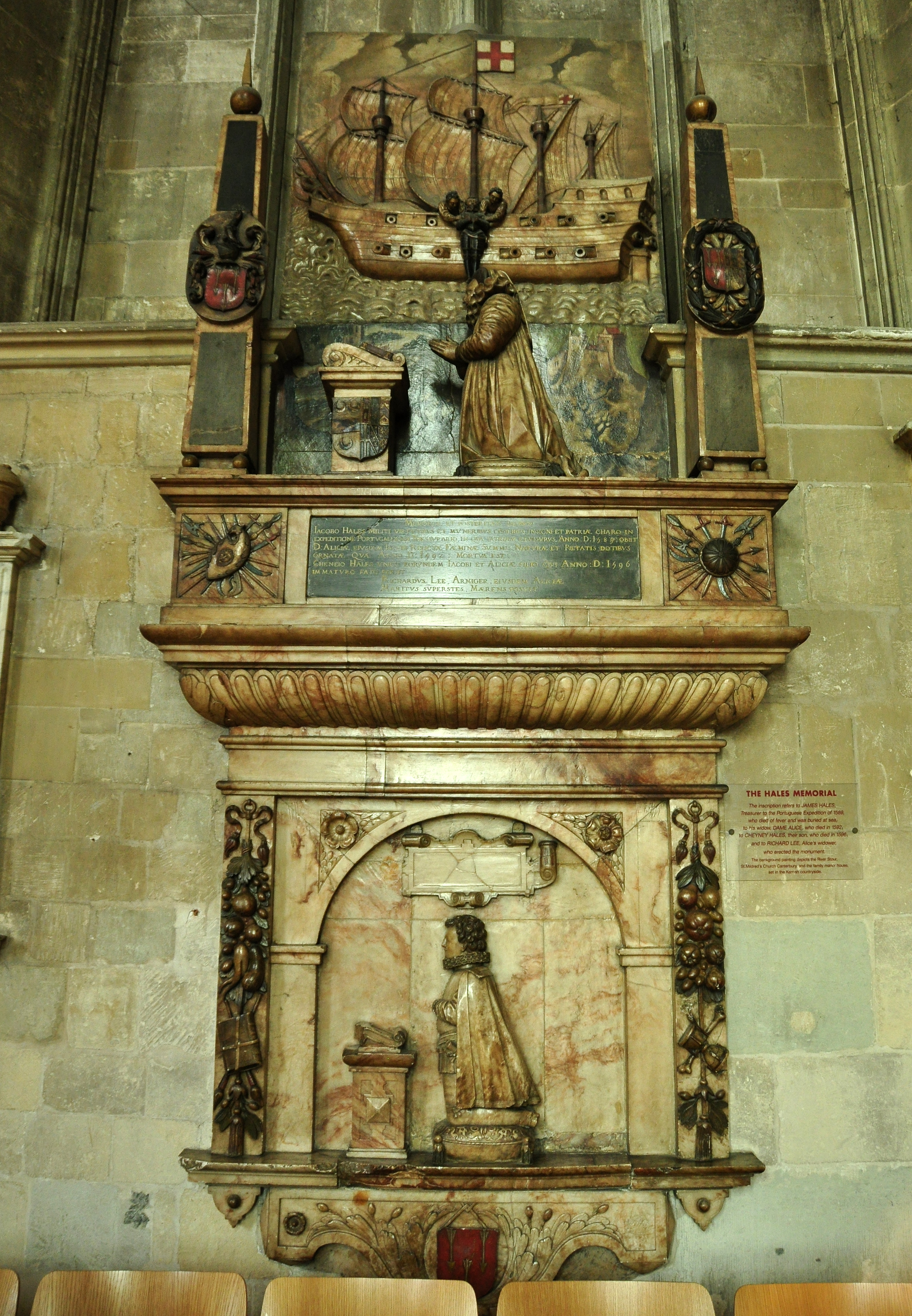
Mural monument to Sir James Hales (d. 1589), Canterbury Cathedral, erected after 1596

Sir James Hales (died 1589) of The Dungeon in the parish of St. Mary Bredin, Canterbury, Kent, was a soldier who served as treasurer of the 1589 expedition to Portugal, a reprisal for the attack by the Spanish Armada on the English fleet the year before. He died as the expedition was about to return home to England and was buried at sea by his fully armed body being dropped feet first over the side of his ship. The scene is depicted in relief sculpture on his surviving mural monument in Canterbury Cathedral.

== Origins ==
He was the son of Humphrey I Hales (died 1571) of The Dungeon in the parish of St. Mary Bredin, Canterbury, Kent, by his wife Joan Atwater, a daughter and co-heiress of Robert Atwater of Royton, in Lenham, Kent. His brother was Humphrey II Hales, York Herald. Humphrey I Hales was the son of Sir James Hales (c. 1500–1554) (eldest son of John Hales (1470-1540), of The Dungeon, Baron of the Exchequer), an eminent Justice of the Common Pleas who committed suicide by drowning in a river at Thanington near Canterbury, the estate of his younger brother (or nephew) Thomas Hales (d. 1583), following imprisonment and torture in the Fleet Prison. The monument includes a painting of the River Stour at Thanington where his death occurred.

== Career ==
In September 1573 he was knighted by Queen Elizabeth I at Cobham Hall. Under the command of Sir Francis Drake and Sir John Norris, He departed with the fleet to Iberia on 18 April 1589, attempting to put Dom Antonio on the throne of Portugal. They landed at La Coruña in northern Spain, where they captured the castle, and where many got sick from drinking bad wine. Later they were further south at Peniche, in Portugal, on the coast not far north of Lisbon. "The Generals there fully resolved that the army should march over land to Lisbon under the conduct of General Norris, and that General Drake should meet him in the river thereof with the fleet, that there should be one company of foot left in guard of the Castle, and six in the ships; also, that the sick and hurt should remain there with provisions for their cures. The General, to try the event of the matter by expedition, the next day began to march in this sort: his own regiment, and the regiment of Sir Roger Williams, Sir Henry Norris, Colonel Lane and Colonel Medkerk in the vanguard; General Drake, Colonel Devereux, Sir Edward Norris, and Colonel Sidney’s in the battle; Sir James Hales, Sir Edward Wingfield, Colonel Umpton’s, Colonel Huntley’s and Colonel Bret’s in the rearward". Hales certainly made it as far as Lisbon, as he mentions in his second will various trophies he captured from Spanish forces, including: "the card and compass found at Lisbon, and my sphere likewise had there; my colours that have been before Lisbon, and my watch-tower bell of Dase(?) Keyes Castle, to be hanged up presently at my house called the Dungeon in place convenient; my three bundles of long pike Spanish staves and all the rest of mine armour that I can have found in the Dreadnought or elsewhere, saving one long Spanish pike with the arming thereof which was taken from a Spaniard at Lisbon; a bannerol of silk taken from a Spanish lance before the gates of Lisbon".

== Marriage and children ==
He married Alice Kempe (d.1592), a daughter of Sir Thomas Kempe (1517–91), of Olantigh, near Wye, Kent, a Member of Parliament for Kent in 1559, by his wife Katherine Cheney, a daughter of Sir Thomas Cheney (1482/87-1558), KG, of the Blackfriars, London and of Shurland, Isle of Sheppey, Kent, an Esquire of the Body to King Henry VIII. Following his death Alice married secondly Sir Richard Lee (died 1608), MP for Canterbury and ambassador to Russia, whom Hales described in his two wills as "my good friend" and to whom he made several bequests, including "the card and compass found at Lisbon", "all that money whatsoever he oweth unto me, so that no part thereof shall ever be demanded", and all his books, pictures and maps. Lee was later involved in a dispute with Hales's nephews concerning his claim to part of the Hales estate. By Alice he had children:

- Cheney Hales (d.1596), son and heir, who is shown as a kneeling effigy at the base of the monument, which records that his death was due to untimely fate. He married Mary Hardress, a daughter of Richard Hardress, by whom he had a son:
  - Sir James Hales, Knight (d.1665), of The Dungeon, the last male of his line, who left a daughter and sole heiress Elizabeth Hales who married firstly Sir Stephen Hales of Smitherfield and secondly George Sheldon.

== Death ==
He made two wills, the first a precautionary one dated 25 March 1588 (1589 in new style), before his departure to Iberia on 18 April 1589, in which he describes himself as "whole both of body and mind, thanked be the Lord of all health", the second made 25 June 1589, in which he describes himself as "whole of mind though sick of body". Many of the participants in the expedition had become ill on arrival, many through having drunken bad wine, captured at La Coruña in northern Spain. He died at sea on the return voyage and was buried at sea, as is depicted on his monument.

== Monument ==
The monument and its inscription provides the chief source for the life of Sir James Hales. It was erected by his widow's second husband Richard Lee, after her death. At the top is shown James Hales (died 1589) as a fully armed figure being lowered feet-first into the water from the side of a ship. It shows at left the arms of Hales (of Hales Place, Canterbury; Woodchurch, Kent; later of Hales baronets): Gules, three arrows or feathered and barbed argent and at right Hales impaling Kempe quarterly of 6: 1: Gules, three garbs within a bordure engrailed or (Kempe of Olantigh, near Wye, Kent). Below the depiction of the burial at sea Alice Kempe kneels at a priedieu on which is displayed a shield showing the arms of A fess between three crescents (Lee) impaling Kempe quarterly of 6, as above right. At the lowest level is the kneeling and praying figure of Cheyney Hales (d.1596).

=== Transcript ===
The Latin inscription is as follows:

'MEMORIAE ET POSTERITATI SACRUM / JACOBO HALES MILITI VIRTUTIBUS ET MUNERIBUS CIVILIBUS INSIGNI ET PATRIAE CHARO IN / EXPEDITIONE PORTUGALIENSI THESAURARIO IN QUA PATRIAM REVISURUS ANNO D. 1589 OBIIT / D: ALICIA EIUSDEM JACOBI RELICTAE FAEMINAE SUMMIS NATURAE ET PIETATIS DOTIBUS / ORNATA QUA ANNO D.1592; MORTUA EST: / CHENEIO HALES UNICO EORUNDEM JACOBI ET ALICIAE FILIO QUI ANNO D.1596. / IMMATURO FATO PERIIT / RICARDUS LEE ARMIGER EIUSDEM ALICIAE / MARITUS SUPERSTES MARENS POSUIT'

Which may be translated as: "Sacred to the memory and posterity of James Hales, Knight, outstanding in virtues and in civic duties and dear to his country. Treasurer in a Portuguese expedition in which about to return home he died in the year of our lord 1589. Dame Alice, widow of the same James, decorated with the gifts of the highest feminine nature and with piety, who died in the year 1592. Cheney Hales the only son of these James and Alice who in the year 1596 perished by untimely fate. Richard Lee, Esquire, surviving husband of the same Alice, placed (this monument), in mourning".
