= Samuel Elias Sawbridge =

English politician (1769-1850)

Member of Parliament for Canterbury
- In office 1796 – 2 March 1797 Serving with John Baker
- Preceded by: George Gipps; Sir John Honywood, Bt
- Succeeded by: Election declared void 2 Mar 1797

Member of Parliament for Canterbury
- In office 1797–1797 Serving with John Baker
- Preceded by: Election declared void 2 Mar 1797
- Succeeded by: Sir John Honywood, Bt; George Gipps

Member of Parliament for Canterbury
- In office 1807–1807 Serving with John Baker
- Preceded by: John Baker; James Simmons
- Succeeded by: John Baker; Edward Taylor

Personal details
- Born: 7 January 1769
- Died: 27 May 1850 (aged 81)
- Party: Whig
- Spouse: Elizabeth Ellis
- Parents: John Sawbridge (father); Anne Stephenson (mother)
- Relatives: John Erle-Drax (son)
- Education: Harrow School; Eton College
- Military career
- Allegiance: Great Britain
- Branch: British Army
- Rank: Colonel
- Unit: East Kent Militia

Samuel Elias Sawbridge (7 January 1769 – 27 May 1850) was an English politician who sat in the House of Commons of Great Britain and then of the United Kingdom from 1796 to 1797 and again in 1807.

He was the second son of John Sawbridge of Olantigh, Kent and his wife Anne Stephenson, daughter of Sir William Stephenson. His father was Lord Mayor of London in 1775 and MP for both Hythe and the City of London. Sawbridge was educated at both Harrow School and Eton College. He joined the East Kent Militia as an ensign and rose to the rank of Colonel by 1808.

On the early death of his elder brother he inherited his father's fortune and in 1796 acquired a seat in Parliament to represent Canterbury. However the election was declared void on 2 March 1797. Re-elected on 10 March 1797 he was again unseated on petition on 12 May 1797. He was finally properly elected for Canterbury in February 1807, sitting only until May 1807, after which he left Parliament for the life of a country gentleman and Militia colonel.

He died in May 1850, aged 81. He had married Elizabeth, the daughter of Bombay Governor Brabazon Ellis of Wyddiall Hall, Hertfordshire, with whom he had 5 sons and 3 daughters. Their son John was Member of Parliament for Wareham for many years.

Parliament of Great Britain
Preceded by George Gipps; Sir John Honywood, Bt	Member of Parliament for Canterbury; 1796 - 2 March 1797; With: John Baker	Succeeded by Election declared void 2 Mar 1797
Preceded by Election declared void 2 Mar 1797	Member of Parliament for Canterbury; 10 March 1797 – 12 May 1797; With: John Baker	Succeeded by Sir John Honywood, Bt; George Gipps
Parliament of the United Kingdom
Preceded by John Baker; James Simmons	Member of Parliament for Canterbury; February–May 1807; With: John Baker	Succeeded by John Baker; Edward Taylor
