= Simon Brome =

English politician, died 1600

Simon Brome, Brown or Browne (died 1600), of St. Andrew's, Canterbury, Kent, was an English politician.

== Career ==
Active in local politics, he was made a Freeman of Canterbury in 1559, Sheriff of Canterbury for 1565–66, an alderman in 1571, and mayor for 1573–74, 1576–77, 1587–88 and 1601–02. He was elected a Member of Parliament (MP) for Canterbury 1584, 1586 and 1589.

He married Mildred Courthope and had at least 7 sons and a daughter.
