= John Twyne =

16th-century English writer and politician

John Twyne (c.1505–1581) was an English schoolmaster, scholar and author, and also Member of Parliament for Canterbury.

== Life ==
He was born about 1501 at Bullington, Hampshire, the son of William Twyne. He was educated, according to Anthony Wood, at New Inn, Oxford, but the matter is uncertain and he seems to have frequented Corpus Christi College; he says he saw there Richard Foxe, Juan Luis Vives, and others. He graduated B.C.L. on 31 January 1525, and then married and became master of the free grammar school at Canterbury.

Twyne's school was a success, and he grew rich, purchasing land. He took an active part in the municipal affairs of Canterbury: he was a common councilman from 1539 to 1547 and 1548 to 1550, Sheriff of Canterbury for 1544–45, an alderman from 1550 to 1562 and mayor of the city for 1553–4. In 1553 he represented the city in parliament.

He gave offence to the Duke of Northumberland, and on 18 May the mayor of Canterbury was directed to send him up to London. Twyne was re-elected MP for Canterbury on 7 September that year. As mayor of the city in 1554 he actively opposed the insurgents during Wyatt's rebellion.

In 1560, during an ecclesiastical visitation of Canterbury, Twyne was reprimanded, and during that year he lost his position as head of The King's School, Canterbury, where he was succeeded by Anthony Rush; in 1562 he was again in trouble, with the privy council. Suspected as a covert Catholic, his prosperity and positions were affected.

Twyne died at Canterbury on 24 November 1581, and was buried on the 30th in St Paul's Church, Canterbury where a brass plate with an inscription commemorated him. By his wife Alice (1507–1567), daughter and coheiress of William Peper, Twyne had issue three sons: John, who lived at Hardacre, and wrote verse; Lawrence Twyne, author of The Painful Pattern of Adventures (1576); and Thomas Twyne, a fairly prolific author. One of his gifted literary-minded pupils was Thomas Peend.

== Works ==
Twyne was a reputed antiquary, classical scholar and teacher. His first literary work was an introduction to an anonymous edition of Hugh of Caumpeden's History of Kyng Boccus and Sydracke (see Book of Sydrac). Twyne collaborated with Robert Saltwood to edit (or translate again) the work from Old French, and Saltwood funded the publication, in 1530s.

In 1590 Thomas Twyne published his late father's De Rebus Albionicis, Britannicis, atque Anglis Commentariorum libri duo, London. It concerns early British history; the discussions in it take a sceptical view of some traditional accounts. In particular the work of Geoffrey of Monmouth is discounted. The book also contains Twyne's reminiscences of Nicholas Wotton, John Dygon, the last prior of St. Augustine's John Foche, Richard Foxe, Vives, and other scholars.

He also collected "Communia Loca", bequeathed to Corpus Christi College, Oxford by his grandson, Brian Twyne. In these collections he refers to now-lost lives he had written of Thomas Lupset, Wotton, William Paget, Thomas Wriothesley, and other contemporaries. Another work, "Vitæ, Mores, Studia, et Fortunæ Regum Angliæ a Gulielmo Conquest. ad Henr. VIII", is now lost; it was possibly the basis of A Booke containing the Portraiture of the Countenances and Attires of the Kings of England from William Conqueror unto … Elizabeth … diligently collected by T. T., London, 1597.

== Notes ==
Attribution

This article incorporates text from a publication now in the public domain: "Twyne, John". Dictionary of National Biography. London: Smith, Elder & Co. 1885–1900.
