= James Hales =

English judge

Sir James Hales
- Arms of Hales: Gules, three arrows or feathered and barbed argent
- Born: c. 1500
- Died: 1554 (aged 53–54); Thanington, Kent
- Spouses: Mary Hales; Margaret Wood
- Parent(s): John Hales, Isabel Harry

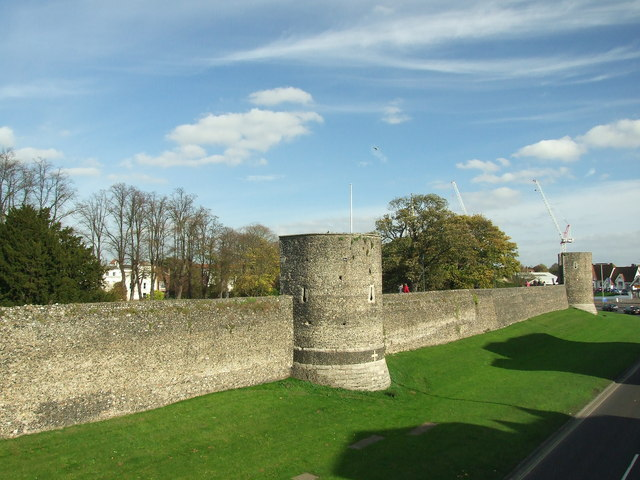
Canterbury city walls, just outside which Sir James Hales' manor of The Dungeon was situated

Sir James Hales (c. 1500–1554) was an English judge from Kent, the son of the politician and judge John Hales. Though a Protestant, he refused to seal the document settling the crown on the Protestant claimant Lady Jane Grey in 1553, and during the following reign of the Catholic Queen Mary I opposed the relaxation of the laws against religious nonconformity. Imprisoned for his lack of sympathy to Catholicism and subjected to intense pressure to convert, in a disturbed state of mind he committed suicide by drowning. The resulting lawsuit of Hales v. Petit is considered to be a source of the gravediggers' dialogue after Ophelia drowns herself in William Shakespeare's play Hamlet.

== Biography ==
The eldest son of John Hales, Baron of the Exchequer and lord of the manor called The Dungeon at Canterbury, and his wife Isabel Harry, His father was a bencher of Gray's Inn, and he was admitted as a student there between 1517 and 1519, being elected an ancient of the Inn in 1528. By 1530 he was acting a counsel in the Court of Requests, and in 1532 became a bencher of Gray's Inn.

In 1541 he was appointed counsel to the corporation of Canterbury, and was an adviser to Archbishop Thomas Cranmer. In 1544 he was appointed King's Serjeant, and shortly thereafter King Henry VIII granted him the manor of Clavertigh in Elham, which he sold after 1547. At the coronation of King Edward VI in 1547 he was appointed Knight of the Order of the Bath, and in 1549 was appointed a Justice of the Common Pleas.

Hales supported the Protestant reformation, and in 1551 was among those who gave sentence of deprivation against Bishop Stephen Gardiner. However, in 1553 he was one of three judges who refused to seal the document by which John Dudley, 1st Duke of Northumberland attempted to settle the crown on the Protestant Lady Jane Grey. When Mary I became queen instead, and greater tolerance towards Catholics was expected, Hales pointed out in a charge to a jury at the Kent assizes that the statutes against Catholics had not been relaxed and that the jury must find according to the law as it then stood.

In October 1553 the Queen renewed his post as a Justice of the Common Pleas but the Lord Chancellor, the reinstated Bishop Gardiner, refused to take his oath and instead sent him to jail. He was held in the King's Bench Prison, the Counter prison in Bread Street, and finally in the Fleet Prison. During his months of captivity, he underwent repeated attempts to make him adopt Catholicism. He eventually complied but, after doing so, tried to commit suicide with a penknife.

In April 1554, the Queen ordered that Hales be released, and in some sources he is said to have been brought to her presence and given "words of great comfort". By then, however, his mental condition was so unsettled that on 4 August of that year, while staying at Thanington near Canterbury with his nephew, he drowned himself by lying face down in a shallow stream. A coroner's inquest determined that his death, being self-inflicted, was a felony. He was commemorated by an inscription in his parish church of St Mary Bredin at Canterbury.

== Hales v. Petit ==
In 1558 his widow instigated legal proceedings against Cyriac Petit to recover a lease of land in Graveney marsh which had been made in 1551 to herself and her late husband. Since the coroner had earlier ruled Hales' death to be a felony, the case of Hales v. Petit turned on the abstruse point of whether the felony of committing suicide had occurred during Sir James' lifetime or after his death. In 1562 the court ruled in favour of Petit. Edmund Plowden published a full report of the case in 1571.

The gravediggers' jocular argumentation in Act V of Hamlet refers to the case, poking fun at its highly abstract legal arguments. Shakespearean commentator John Hawkins (1773) noted the similarity in phrasing between Plowden's report of the case:

Walsh said that the Act consists of three Parts. The first is the Imagination, which is a Reflection or Meditation of the Mind [...] The second is the Resolution, which is a Determination of the Mind to destroy himself [...] The third is the Perfection, which is the Execution of what the Mind has resolved to do [...]

and the gravediggers' humorously mangled version:

It must be se offendendo; it cannot be else. For here lies the point: if I drown myself wittingly, it argues an act; and an act hath three branches — it is to act, to do and to perform; argal, she drown'd herself wittingly.

== Family ==
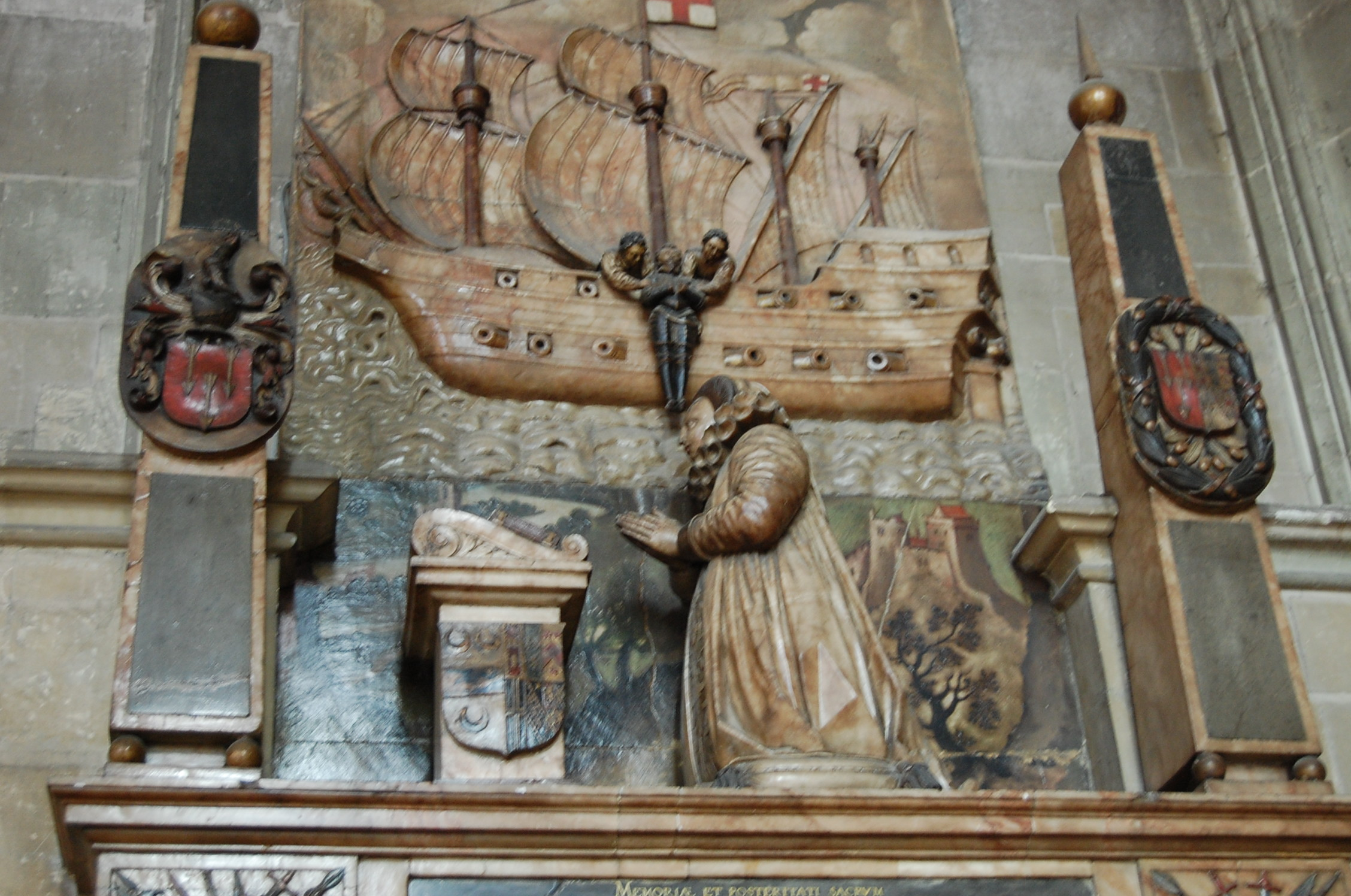
Monument to Sir James Hales (d.1589) in Canterbury Cathedral, displaying the arms of Hales (of Hales Place, Canterbury; Woodchurch, Kent; later used by Hales baronets): Gules, three arrows or feathered and barbed argent

He married twice, his first wife being Mary, daughter and coheiress of Thomas Hales (died 1520), a merchant of the Staple from Abingdon who in 1491 had acquired the manor of Fillets Court in Henley-on-Thames, and his wife Agnes. Their children included:

- Humphrey (died 1571), who married Joyce (died 1594), daughter of Robert Atwater of Royton by Lenham, and was the father of Sir James Hales (d.1589).
- Edward, who followed his father and elder brother in a legal career.
- Mildred (died 1596), who married Thomas Docwra, nephew and heir of Thomas Docwra, Grand Prior of the Knights Hospitaller.
- Mary, who in about 1534 married Wiliam Ryther (died 1563), of Harewood Castle, an esquire of the body to Queen Mary, and was mother of the MP James Ryther.
- Jane, who in about 1547 married Walter Mantell, the son of her stepmother Margaret, who was executed at Sevenoaks in 1554, and after his death Christopher Carlell, of Monks Horton.
- Elizabeth, who married John Gayson.
- Frances (born about 1532), who in 1554 married Walter Hendley, of Coursehorn in Cranbrook.

His second wife was Margaret, daughter and coheiress of Oliver Wood (died 1521), of Collington, who had been widowed twice. Her first husband was Sir Walter Mantell (died 1529) of Nether Heyford in Northamptonshire, and two of her sons had been executed: John Mantell for felony in 1541, and Walter Mantell in 1554 for his part in Wyatt's rebellion, as was her grandson Walter Mantell, son of John. Her daughter Margaret Mantell (died 1540) was the mother of the poet and translator Barnaby Googe. Her second husband (as his second wife) was Sir William Haute (died 1539) of Bishopsbourne in Kent. Dying on 18 September 1567, Margaret was buried in St Mildred's Church, Canterbury, where there is a monument to her memory.
