= Gabrielle Davis =

British politician (1938–2025)

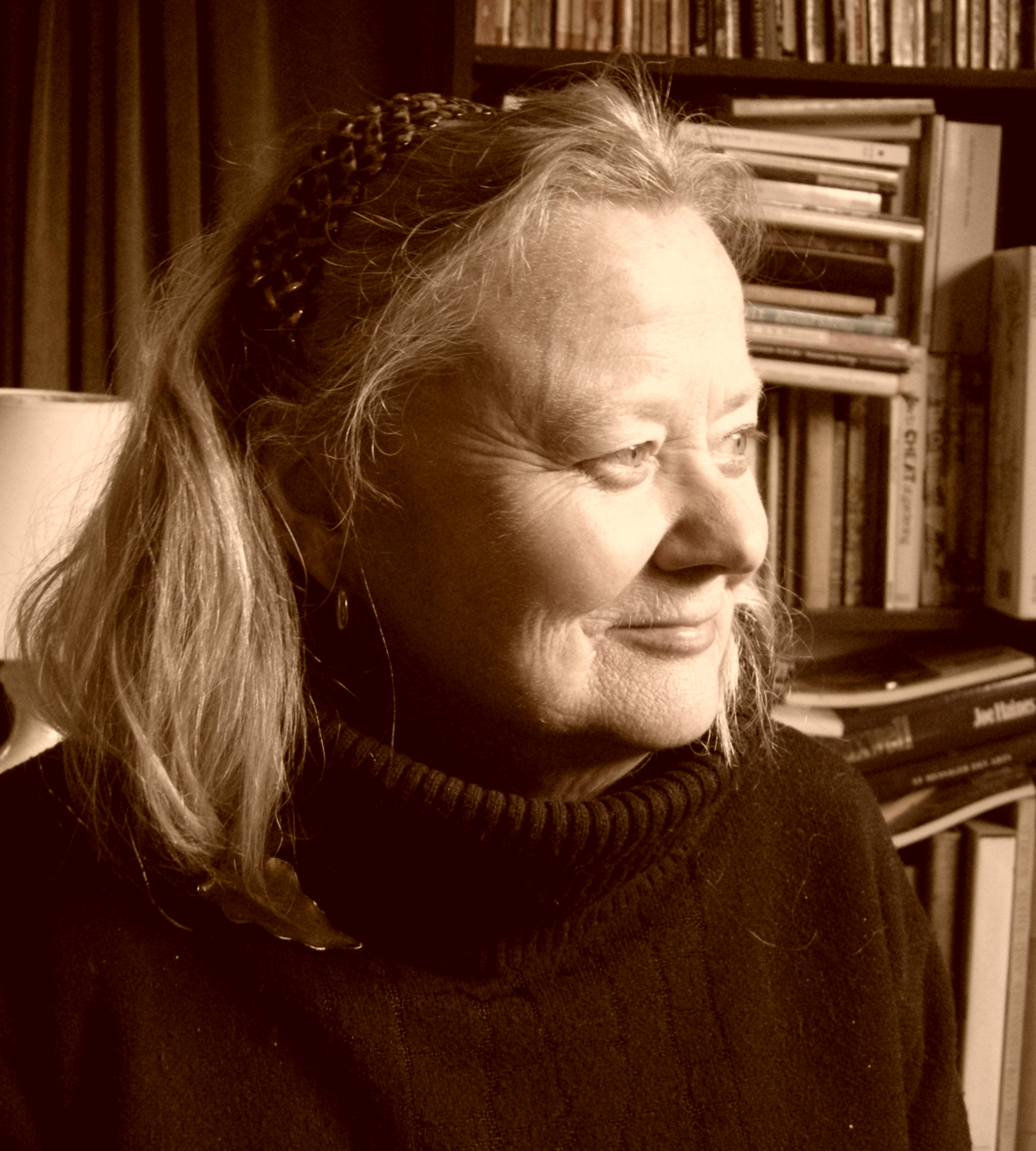
- Davis in 2010

Personal details
- Born: 7 December 1938 Canterbury, Kent, England
- Died: 24 February 2025 (aged 86)

Mary G. W. Davis (née Taylor; 7 December 1938 – 24 February 2025), known as Gabrielle Davis, was a British Conservative politician who was a councillor for Canterbury, as well as serving as Sheriff of Canterbury from 2009 to 2010. She was notable for volunteering to head the "defence of our heritage" movement. This action moved against a vote by the Canterbury City Council Executive Committee on 21 January 2010 to close Herne Bay Museum and Gallery and other repositories of local heritage for the sake of saving £112,600 per year.

== Background ==
Davis was born on 7 December 1938 in Canterbury, (Note: Mary G.W. Davis née Taylor (1938–2025). GRO index: Births Dec 1938 Taylor Mary G.W. (mother surname Roberts) Canterbury 2a 1738. Marriages 1984 Taylor Mary G W (spouse Noel M. Davis) Canterbury 16 289) and lived in Herne Bay, attending La Sainte Union Convent School which was run by the Sisters of La Sainte Union des Sacrés-Coeurs, and is now closed. She started as a journalist on local papers, including the Coventry Telegraph, before moving on to national titles, including the magazine Women’s Realm and the Daily Mail, and interviewed many celebrities including Camilla-Parker Bowles. She lived in Herne Bay, wrote the Beltinge column for Herne Bay Gazette and supported causes concerning pets and wildlife. She was fundraising officer for six years at Cats Protection in Canterbury, and was Trustee for Animals Worldwide.

== Duties ==
Davis was elected a member of Canterbury City Council in 2003 and Sheriff of Canterbury in May 2009 and was a ward member for Reculver. Until May 2010, she was the latest in the line of Sheriffs of Canterbury which goes back to 1461. In past centuries the post involved tax-collecting and police work, but since 1974 the Sheriff has been relieved of those duties and now represents the City at functions and other civic duties. The postholder is elected at the annual Council meeting in May, for one year. In May 2010 she was succeeded as Sheriff of Canterbury by Councillor Sally Pickersgill.

== Defence of our heritage ==
In October 2009, Canterbury City Council said it had to save £3.5m for budgeting purposes. The executive committee made its final recommendation to close the museum on 21 January 2010; the final vote to be taken on 18 February 2010. Councillor Davis was a founder-member of Herne Bay Improvement and Conservation Trust, and some of her colleagues on the Trust were members of Herne Bay Historical Society, which has charge of most of the collections at Herne Bay Museum. In response to the Council vote to close the museum, she volunteered to head "defence of our heritage", in spite of the fact that the vote for closure was made by her Conservative colleagues on the council. The Herne Bay Museum and Gallery reopened in 2015 as the Seaside Museum Herne Bay.

== Personal life and death ==
Gabrielle Davis was married to Noel for 15 years before his death. In 2023, Davis moved to a care home in Cheshire to be close to her family. She died on 24 February 2025, at the age of 86.

== Bibliography ==
- Wallace, Ann; Taylor, Gabrielle (1987). Royal mothers: from Eleanor of Aquitaine to Princess Diana. London: Piatkus. ISBN 978-0-86188-505-3.

== Notes ==
Civic offices
Preceded by Charlotte MacCaul	Sheriff of Canterbury; May 2009 – May 2010	Succeeded by Sally Pickersgill
