= Thomas Hales (c. 1515 – at least 1585) =

English politician

- Born: c. 1515
- Died: 1585 (aged 69–70)
- Spouses: Joan Holwey; Alice Evyas
- Children: 2 sons, 4 daughters
- Parent(s): John Hales, Isabel Harry

Thomas Hales (c. 1515 – 1585 or later), of Thanington, near Canterbury, Kent, was an English politician.

== Biography ==
Thomas Hales was the second son of John Hales (1469/70–c. 1540), Baron of the Exchequer, of The Dungeon or Dane John, Canterbury, Kent, and his wife Isabel (or Elizabeth) daughter of Stephen Harry. Hales is thought to have been about 30 years of age when he was sworn to the liberties of Canterbury on 19 September 1547. He appears to have been in the service of Archbishop Thomas Cranmer, and is thought to have secured a seat in Parliament for Canterbury in 1547 through Cranmer's patronage. After Cranmer's death Hales was not re-elected to Parliament, and was only active in local matters in Kent. He was appointed a justice of the Kent bench in 1558, and remained in that post until his death, which took place c. 1585, at which time a document contains his named, crossed out, with 'mortuus' written beside it.

Hales was the ancestor of the Baronets Hales of Thanington and Bekesbourne.

== Family ==
Hales married firstly, Joan Holway, the daughter of Clement Holwey of Hythe, Kent, by whom he had one son and three daughters, and secondly, by 1552, Alice Evyas, the daughter of Humphrey Evyas, by whom he had a son and a daughter.
