= Bartholomew Brome =

English politician

Bartholomew Brome, Brown or Browne (fl. 1589) was an English politician.

He was the son of Robert Brome. He was active in the local politics of Canterbury, Kent, being made a Freeman of the city in 1563, a common councilman in 1564, Sheriff of Canterbury for 1572–73 and 1575–76, an alderman in 1584 and mayor for 1589–90.

Brome was a Member of Parliament (MP) for Canterbury in 1589.

He married twice; firstly Anne, with whom he had at least 1 daughter and secondly Anne Parker.
