= George Gipps (Canterbury MP) =

British politician (c.1728–1800)

George Gipps (c. 1728 – 13 February 1800) was an English apothecary, hop merchant, banker and politician who sat in the House of Commons of Great Britain between 1780 and 1796.

Gipps was the son of Henry Gipps, a staymaker of Ashford, and his wife Sarah Flint. He began as an apothecary at Canterbury but later became a hop merchant.

Gipps was elected Member of Parliament (MP) for Canterbury in 1780 and held the seat to 1796. By 1790 he had given up the hop trade to become a banker in the firm Gipps, Simmons and Gipps of Canterbury. He had also taken the lease of Hall Place in Harbledown. The election of 28 May 1796 was declared void in March 1797 and he was reinstated as MP for Canterbury and remained until 1800.

Gipps married firstly Elizabeth Johanna Roberts daughter of John Roberts of Harbledown on 2 August 1755. He married secondly on 27 November 1780 Sarah Stanton, daughter of William Stanton. He married thirdly Elizabeth Lawrence, daughter of Thomas Lawrence MD on 18 January 1792. He had two sons by his second wife, of whom George Gipps also became an MP.

Parliament of Great Britain
| Preceded by Richard Milles; Sir William Mayne | Member of Parliament for Canterbury; 1780–1796; With: Charles Robinson 1780–1790; Sir John Honywood, Bt 1790–1796 | Succeeded by John Baker; Samuel Elias Sawbridge |
| Preceded by John Baker; Samuel Elias Sawbridge | Member of Parliament for Canterbury; 1797–1800; With: Sir John Honywood, Bt | Succeeded by Sir John Honywood, Bt; George Watson |
