= Edward Taylor (MP for Canterbury) =

English politician

Edward Taylor (24 June 1774 – 22 June 1843) was an English politician who sat in the House of Commons from 1807 to 1812.

== Life ==
Taylor was the son of Rev. Edward Taylor of Bifrons, Patrixbourne, Kent and his wife Margaret Payler, daughter of Thomas Turner Payler of Ileden, who died at Brussels in 1780; General Herbert Taylor was his brother. He was educated in Baden from 1783 to 1788. He matriculated at Merton College, Oxford in 1793.

Taylor had a small country house Rowling near Canterbury where he was visited in 1794 by the novelist Jane Austen and her sister Cassandra. Austen became enamoured of Taylor, who had "such beautiful dark eyes", writing two years later "We went by Bifrons and I contemplated with a melancholy pleasure the abode of Him, on whom I once fondly doted." In 1800, Taylor was a captain in the Romney fencible dragoons.

In 1807, Taylor was elected member of parliament (MP) for Canterbury. He held the seat to 1812.

Taylor died aged 68.

== Family ==
Taylor married Louisa Beckingham, daughter of Rev. John Charles Beckingham of Bourne House, Kent in 1802. They had six sons and six daughters.

Parliament of the United Kingdom
Preceded by John Baker; Samuel Elias Sawbridge	Member of Parliament for Canterbury; 1807–1812; With: John Baker	Succeeded by John Baker; Stephen Rumbold Lushington
