= Isaac Colfe =

English priest

Isaac Colfe (by 1560–1597) was an English divine.

== Life ==
Colfe was the fourth son of Amandus, Almantius, or Aymon Colfe and his wife, Catherine Bradfield, and uncle of Abraham Colfe. He was born in Canterbury in or before 1560. His father and mother, who were zealous Protestants, had a considerable estate at Guisnes, which they lost on the reconquest of Calais by the French in 1558. They came over to England, lived in a house outside the West-gate of Canterbury, afterwards occupied by their third son Joseph, Mayor of Canterbury, and were both buried in Westgate Church.

Isaac was entered as a commoner of Broadgates Hall, Oxford, in 1576, and proceeded B. A. on 17 Feb. 1580, and M. A. on 4 July 1582. Having taken orders he was presented to the vicarage of Stone, Kent on 25 Feb. 1585, and resigned it in 1587, on his appointment to the vicarage of Brookland in the same county. On 18 June 1596 he was inducted master of Kingsbridge Hospital, Canterbury. He died on 15 June 1597, and was buried in the chapter-house of the cathedral.

== Works ==
He published:

- 'A Sermon preached on the Queene's Day, being 17 November 1587, at the Town of Lidd in Kent (on Ps. cxviii. 22-6),' printed in 1588 at London, and dedicated to the mayor and jurats of Lidd; a copy is in the Bodleian.
- 'A Comfortable Treatise on the Temptation of Christ,' 1596, London, wrongly attributed by Wood to Isaac Colfe, rector of Chaldwell, son of Richard Colfe, prebendary of Canterbury.

== Family ==
He was a married man, but the name of his wife is not known. He had two sons: Isaac of Christ Church, and Jacob of All Souls' College, Oxford.
