= Kentish Post =

Newspaper

The Kentish Post: or the Canterbury News-Letter, Canterbury's first newspaper, published between 1717 and 1768, is the predecessor of the present-day Kentish Gazette.

The original imprint of the Post was Canterbury: Printed by Thomas Reeve, in Castle street, for the Proprietors, but the name of the printer/proprietor very soon changed to James Abree, who had set up as a printer in Canterbury in 1717, presumably with the intention of producing a newspaper.

Originally appearing on Wednesdays, by 1721 the Kentish Post had become a bi-weekly, appearing every Wednesday and Saturday.

In 1764 the now elderly Abree took on an assistant, George Kirkby, the son of a Canterbury vicar, who was completing an apprenticeship with a London printer. In 1768 Abree announced that he was retiring in favour of his young colleague Kirkby. However, in May of the same year another young recent printing apprentice from Canterbury, James Simmons, started to publish a rival twice-weekly paper called the Kentish Gazette. A trade war between the two newspapers ensued. After four weeks, Kirkby gave in and the two papers merged, to appear under joint management as the Kentish Gazette, or Canterbury Chronicle. The firm of Simmons and Kirkby prospered, remaining in existence as an important regional printer and publisher until 1791. The Kentish Gazette is still in existence (As of March 2015) as Canterbury's principal weekly newspaper.

The retail network of the Kentish Post stretched throughout Kent, using booksellers in the major towns as outlets and as agents for advertisements. The main towns served by the newspaper were Ashford, Chatham, Cranbrook, Dover, Faversham, Folkestone, Maidstone, Margate, Ramsgate, Rochester, Sandwich and Sittingbourne, as well as some London coffee houses.

In addition to the usual contents (national and international news from the London papers, local commodity prices, shipping news, and advertisements), the Kentish Post was an early example of the practice of serialisation of novels. In 1722/1723 Abree followed the example of the London Post by serialising the scandalous new novel Moll Flanders, shortly after its first publication in book form.
