= Robert Lewis (MP) =

16th-century English politician

Robert Lewis (by 1486 – 1560/1561), of Canterbury, Kent, was an English politician.

He was born the son of John Lewis of Canterbury and traded as a merchant.

== Career ==
He was active in local politics, serving as a common councilman in Canterbury by 1519, Sheriff of Canterbury for 1522–23, an alderman by 1524, and Mayor of Canterbury for 1529–30, 1536–37, 1540–41, 1550–51.

Lewis was elected a member of parliament for Canterbury in 1539 and 1545.

He married twice; firstly Anne Mynote, with whom he had at least two sons and secondly Margery, with whom he had at least one son.
