= James Abree =

English printer, publisher, and bookseller

James Abree (1691?–1768) was an 18th-century English printer, publisher, and bookseller.

Abree was the son of William Abree of Winchester. He was apprenticed to the London printer Ichabod Dawkes from 1705 to 1712. Abree moved to Canterbury in 1717, possibly at the invitation of the city authorities. He seems to have been the printer of Canterbury's first newspaper, the Kentish Post, founded in 1717. In 1722 he became a freeman of Canterbury and in the same year married Mary, the daughter of Samuel and Frances Simmons of Deal, (died 1748). They had one child, a daughter also named Mary, who married Lieutenant Thomas Woolley Pickering R.N. in 1745.

Besides his newspaper, Abree also printed books and ephemera such as bellman's verses and ballads; he also acted as an agent for the Sun Fire Office and no doubt sold stationery through his bookshop.

At the end of his career, Abree took on an assistant, George Kirkby, son of a Canterbury vicar, who had been apprenticed to the London printer James Bettenham. In 1768, the Kentish Post announced that Abree was planning to retire in favour of his assistant Kirkby. A rival paper was started by James Simmons and after a short circulation war, the two newspapers merged as the Kentish Gazette which is still published weekly in Canterbury (2011). The firm of Simmons and Kirkby remained in operation for 23 years after Abree's retirement.
