= William Coppyn =

16th-century English politician

William Coppyn (by 1509–1558), of Canterbury, Kent, was an English politician.

== Career ==
He was involved in local politics as a common councilman of Canterbury by 1537, Sheriff of Canterbury for 1538–1539, an alderman from 1539 to his death and Mayor of Canterbury for 1541–1542 and 1551–1552.

He was a Member of Parliament (MP) for Canterbury.

He married Anne and had a daughter.
