= Francis Stock =

British academic and academic administrator

Francis Edgar Stock CBE (5 July 1914 – 26 September 1997) was a British academic and academic administrator.

He was educated at Colfe's Grammar School, King's College London (AKC; Jelf Medal) and the University of Edinburgh. He was a lecturer at the University of Liverpool from 1946 to 1948 then Professor of Surgery at the University of Hong Kong from 1948 to 1963. He was Commodore of Royal Hong Kong Yacht Club from 1957 to 1963. He then returned to the University of Liverpool where he was Professor of Surgery from 1964 to 1970. He then served as Vice-Chancellor of the University of Natal from 1970 to 1977. He was made a CBE in 1977.
