= John Rose (died 1591) =

English politician

John Rose (died 1591), of Canterbury, Kent, was an English politician.

== Career ==
Rose was a tailor who was active in the local politics of Canterbury as an alderman in 1569 and mayor of the city for 1574–75 and 1583–84.

He was elected a Member of Parliament (MP) for Canterbury in 1584 and 1586.

He married the widow Ursula Stuard in 1557 and had no children.
