= Anthony Webbe (English politician) =

Member of the Parliament of England

Anthony Webbe (died 1578?), of St. Andrew's, Canterbury and Fordwich, Kent was an English politician.

== Family ==
Webbe was the son of the MP George Webbe of Canterbury and his wife Anne (died 1551). Webbe married a woman named Dorothy, who outlived him, dying in 1594. They had at least five sons and one daughter.

== Career ==
He was involved in local politics and was made a Freeman of Canterbury in 1552, sheriff for 1563–64, an alderman in 1569 and mayor for 1571–72. He was elected a Member of Parliament (MP) for Canterbury in 1572.
