= George Maye =

16th-century English politician

George Maye, of Canterbury, Kent, was an English politician.

== Career ==
Active in local politics, he was Sheriff of Canterbury for 1549, an alderman by 1557 and mayor for 1557–58 and 1565–66. He was city auditor in 1564–65.

He was elected Member of Parliament (MP) for Canterbury in 1559.
