= Stephen Rumbold Lushington =

English politician and administrator (1776-1868)

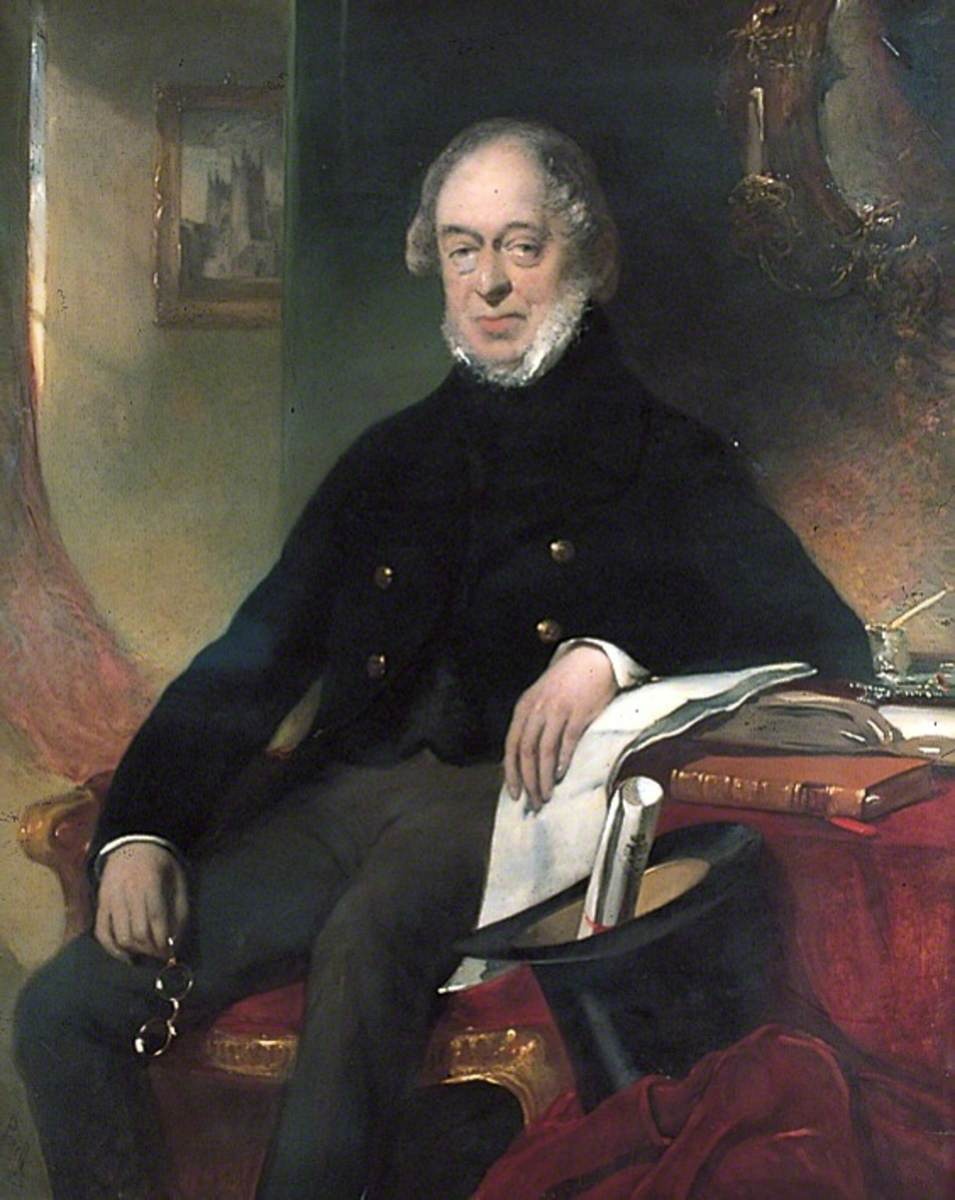
Stephen Rumbold Lushington, 1856 portrait

Stephen Rumbold Lushington (6 May 1776 – 5 August 1868) was an English Tory politician and an administrator in India. He was governor of Madras from 1827 to 1835.

== Early life ==
He was born at Bottisham, Cambridgeshire, the son of the Rev. James Stephen Lushington of Rodmersham and his second wife, Mary Christian, daughter of the Rev. Humphrey Christian. He was educated at Rugby School, and was in India from 1792. Initially he was a translator.

In England from 1807, he unsuccessfully contested the borough of Canterbury at the 1807 general election, but in July that year he was elected at an uncontested by-election as a Member of Parliament (MP) for the borough of Rye in Sussex. At the 1812 general election he was returned without a contest for Canterbury, and held that seat until the 1830 general election. He was Secretary to the Treasury from 1814 to 1827.

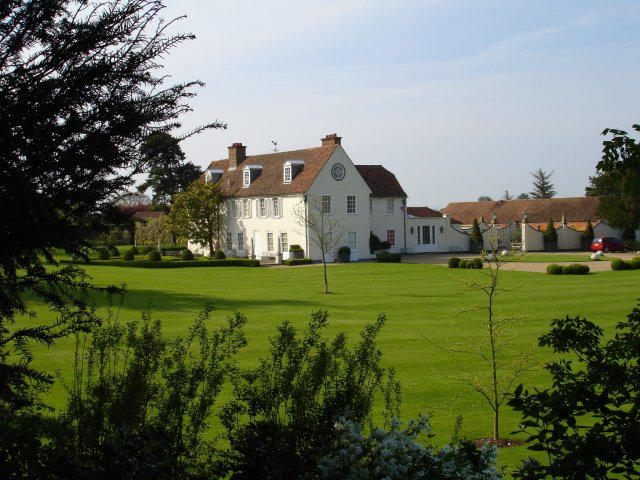
Norton Court, 2006 photograph

Lushington owned Norton Court in Norton, Kent, where he knew Jane Austen, and founded nearby schools.

== Governor of Madras ==
In 1827, Lushington was appointed governor of Madras in succession to Thomas Munro, 1st Baronet. But as Munro fell ill and died even before his tenure had ended, Henry Sullivan Graeme acted as the governor in interim till Lushington's arrival in Madras.

Lushington served as Governor of Madras from 1827 to 1832. The Madras Club was started in 1832 during Lushington's tenure as governor. In 1830, the Court of Directors of the East India Company sent a despatch to Madras urging the authorities to improve the quality of English education in the presidency.

== Later life ==
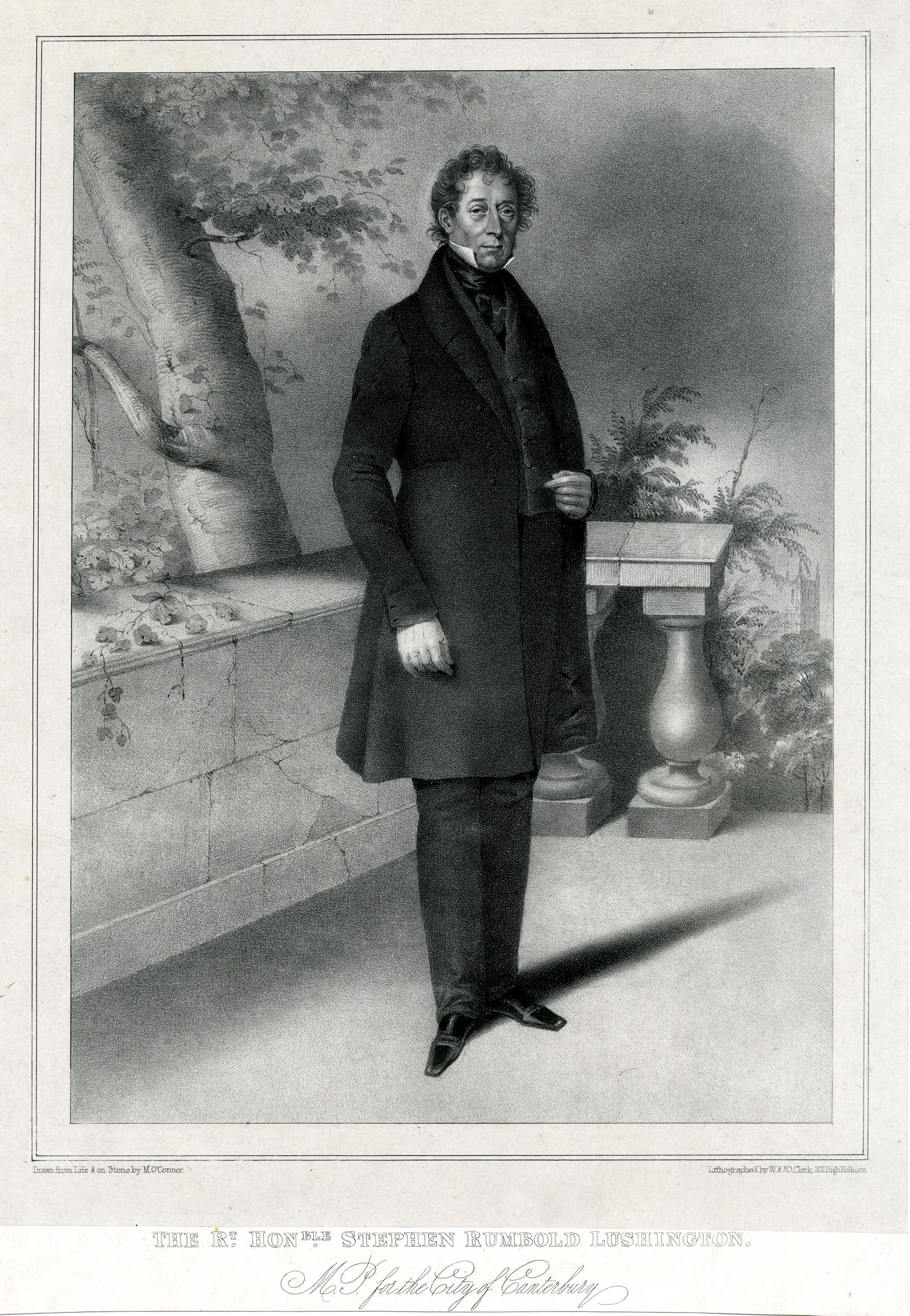
Stephen Rumbold Lushington, 1840s lithograph

Lushington unsuccessfully contested Canterbury again at the 1835 general election, but the result was overturned on petition. He held the seat until he stood down in 1837.

== Family ==
Lushington was twice married.

1. Firstly, in 1797, he married Anne Elizabeth Harris (died 1856), da. of Gen. George Harris, 1st Baron Harris. They had six sons and two daughters.
2. Secondly, in 1858, to Marianne Hearne, daughter of James Hearne of Great Portland Street. There was no issue.

Lushington's 1840 book The Life and Services of General Lord Harris, G.C.B. was a biography of his father-in-law by his first marriage.

Parliament of the United Kingdom
Preceded by Sir William Elford, Bt; Earl of Clancarty	Member of Parliament for Rye; 1807–1812; With: William Jacob	Succeeded by Thomas Lamb; Sir Henry Sullivan, Bt
Preceded by Edward Taylor; John Baker	Member of Parliament for Canterbury; 1812–1830; With: John Baker; Lord Clifton	Succeeded by Viscount Fordwich; Richard Watson
Preceded by Frederick Villiers; Lord Albert Conyngham	Member of Parliament for Canterbury; 1835–1837; With: Lord Albert Conyngham	Succeeded by James Bradshaw; Lord Albert Conyngham
