= Colfe's School =

Location
- Horn Park Lane; Horn Park, London, SE12 8AW; England; 51.45°N 0.021°E

Information
- Type: Private day school Public school
- Motto: Ad astra per aspera (Through hardships to the stars)
- Established: 1568; 458 years ago (reestablished 1652)
- Founder: John Glyn in 1568; Reestablished with Abraham Colfe's name in 1652
- Local authority: Greenwich
- Department for Education URN: 100202 Tables
- Governors: Worshipful Company of Leathersellers
- Headmaster: Dan Gabriele
- Gender: Co-educational
- Age range: 3–18
- Enrolment: 1,150 (approx.)
- Houses: Beardwood, Bramley, Norton, Prendergast, Glyn
- Colours: Blue and gold
- Publication: The Colfeian
- Affiliation: Headmasters' and Headmistresses' Conference
- Alumni: Old Colfeians
- Official Visitor: Prince Michael of Kent
- Website: www.colfes.com

Colfe's School, previously Colfe's Grammar School, is a co-educational private day school in Horn Park in the Royal Borough of Greenwich, in southeast London, England, and one of the oldest schools in London. The school is a member of the Headmasters' and Headmistresses' Conference. The official Visitor to the school is Prince Michael of Kent.

== History ==
Colfe's is one of the oldest schools in London. The parish priest of Lewisham taught the local children from the time of Richard Walker's chantry, founded in 1494, until the dissolution of the monasteries by Henry VIII. Rev. John Glyn re-established the school in 1568 and it was granted a charter by Elizabeth I in 1574. Abraham Colfe became a governor in 1613 and the school was re-founded bearing his name in 1652.

Colfe declared that the aim of the school was to provide an education for the boys from "the Hundred of Blackheath". He invited the Leathersellers' Company, one of London's livery companies, to be the trustee of his will. Links between the school and the Leathersellers remain strong.

The school was originally built around Colfe's house with an entrance in Lewisham Hill. The site was progressively developed and extended until 1890, when it was completely rebuilt on the same site with its entrance now in Granville Park. During the Second World War the school was first evacuated to Tunbridge Wells, Kent, and then to Frome in Somerset. A period of inactivity on the Western front led about 100 boys to return to London, so the school was split for a few years. In 1944 a V2 (flying bomb) almost totally destroyed the school.

At the end of the War, with no school buildings and the pupil roll having halved, it was uncertain if the school would continue. In London the school was split between two sites – Beacon Road School in Hither Green and Ennersdale Road School, about a quarter of a mile away. Temporary buildings (rows of pre-fabricated concrete construction) were erected and the school came together again in 1947 under the headmastership of Herbert Beardwood MSc. The "temporary" buildings were still being used until the move to the new site in 1963.

Herbert Beardwood updated Leland Duncan's History of Colfe's Grammar School in 1952, in celebration of the school's tercentenary under Colfe's name. The book was further updated by Beardwood in 1972, to reflect both the move to the present campus at the east end of the playing fields, and the impact on the school of the machinations of early 1970s UK politics.

The school moved to its current site in 1963 and since then there has been much change: improved facilities have been provided, such as an all-weather sports pitch, a performing arts centre, and new classroom facilities. The Leathersellers' sports ground has been renovated to make it the home of senior sport (rugby, football and cricket).

Having been a voluntary aided grammar school, Colfe's became independent again in 1977. Although founded as a school for boys, girls have been admitted to the Sixth Form since 1977. In 1997, it was decided to allow girls throughout the school, and today the school is fully co-educational.

== Current organisation ==
The school admits pupils at the age of 3 into the Nursery, from which they progress to the Junior School aged 4. From here pupils make the transition to the Senior school at the age of 11.

=== Senior School (ages 11–18) ===
The Senior School is at the top of the main school site. An all-weather playing field (funded in part by donations from parents and former pupils) was opened in 2006. The school has a performing arts centre, a sports complex complete with a 25m swimming pool, two gyms and a sports hall, IT and music facilities and over 30 acres (12 ha) of playing fields. Many of the facilities are shared with the junior school. There are 6 buildings in the Senior School: the Main Teaching Block and the Stewart Building create the central "ring", with the Modern Languages Building (Meridian Building), Beardwood Theatre (Art / Music block) and the Laurel Building (L Block). The Russell Building, named after Colfe's previous headmaster, Richard Russell, is now open as of September 2025 and now houses Computer Science, Geography and Learning Support.

=== Junior School (ages 3–11) ===
The Junior School is at the bottom of the school site, in two self-contained buildings.

== Notable alumni ==
- Eric Ambler OBE (1909–1998), novelist
- Professor Henry Armstrong FRS (1848–1937), chemist
- Sir John Bennett (1814–1897), politician and watchmaker
- Sir Antonio Brady (1811–1881), Admiralty official, naturalist, and social reformer
- Sir Richard Madox Bromley (1813–1865), civil servant
- Garry Bushell, journalist and musician
- James Cleverly, Conservative politician: former Home Secretary, former Foreign Secretary
- Paul Clinton, cricketer
- Richard Clinton, cricketer
- Billy Cooper, Barmy Army England cricket trumpeter
- Brian Fahey, musician, arranger and musical director
- Christopher Fowler, novelist and journalist
- Sir Alan Goodison, diplomat
- Professor Kenneth Grayston, professor of theology
- Malcolm Hardee, comedy club proprietor
- Sir John Hayes CBE MP Conservative Politician
- Norman Hepple RA RP (1908–1994), portrait painter
- Peter Howitt, actor, film writer and director
- Rob Key, England cricketer
- David Lindsay (1876–1945), novelist, author of A Voyage to Arcturus
- F.L. Lucas (1894–1967), literary critic and writer
- James Marsh, Academy Award-winning film maker of Man on Wire
- Edmund Nelson (1910–2007), portrait painter
- Steve Parish, chairman of Crystal Palace F.C.
- Claire Rafferty, English female international footballer
- Tony Reeves, musician with Greenslade, Curved Air and Colosseum
- Olly Robbins, senior civil servant and Permanent Under-Secretary of State for Foreign Affairs
- Jack Ryder, actor
- Professor Maurice George 'Dick' Say (1902–1992), electrical engineer
- W. A. Campbell Stewart (1915–1997), educationist and university administrator
- Francis Stock, vice-chancellor of the University of Natal
- Will Tilston, actor
- Henry Williamson, novelist, author of Tarka the Otter
- Dennis Main Wilson, producer of television and radio comedy
- Victor Maslin Yeates, World War I Royal Flying Corps fighter ace
