= John Crispe =

English politician

John Crispe (died 1501) was an English landowner and politician from Kent.

Probably the John Crispe mentioned in the 1619 Visitation of Kent, he was an MP of the Parliament of England for Canterbury in 1489. His grandson was the MP Henry Crispe.

Parliament of England
Preceded by Sir George Browne ?	Member of Parliament for Canterbury; 1489; With: ?	Succeeded by Thomas Atwode ?
