= George Webbe (MP) =

16th-century English politician

George Webbe (by 1509 to 1556), of Canterbury, Kent, was an English politician.

Active in the local politics of Canterbury, he was a common councilman of the city by 1537, sheriff for 1537–38, an alderman in 1540, and mayor for 1552–53. He was appointed a commissioner for goods of churches and fraternities in 1553.

In March 1553, he was a Member of Parliament for Canterbury.

He married twice; firstly Anne, with whom he had six sons, including Anthony, and six daughters; and secondly, Margaret.
