= Hardacre =

Hardacre is a surname. Notable people with the surname include:

- F. M. Hardacre (1915–2011), American football coach
- Helen Hardacre (born 1949), American academic and Japanologist
- Herbert Hardacre (1861–1938), Australian politician

== See also ==
- Hardacre Theater, a historic building in Tipton, Iowa, United States
- Hardacre Film Festival, an annual film festival in Tipton, Iowa, United States
- The Hardacres, 2024 British period drama television series, based on the novel Hardacre by C. L. Skelton
