= Avri =

Avri is a given name. Notable people with the name include:

- Avri Gilad (born 1962), Israeli media personality
- Avri Ran (born 1955), Israeli activist, criminal, and entrepreneur
- Avri Levitan (born 1973), Israeli violist and director
