= Edmund Nelson (painter) =

English painter

- Born: 24 January 1910
- Died: 22 January 2007 (aged 96)
- Known for: Portrait painter

Edmund Nelson (24 January 1910 – 22 January 2007) was a British traditional portrait painter.

== Biography ==
Edmund Nelson was educated at Goldsmiths College in London. He married fellow art student, Ruth Swanson, in 1939. During World War II he served in the RAF in Egypt. He and his wife raised two children Jane (1941) and Martin (1949).

Edmund Nelson's painting career flourished between 1949 and 1956, after which time traditional paintings were viewed as out of fashion. Nelson taught Art in a school at South Wootton, Norfolk. Edmund created a muse-like pastel portrait of the daughter of neighbours who lived over the road; that portrait still hangs in her Swiss home. Ruth and Edmund also had a holiday home in Selsey. Their homes were comfortable places where creativity and discussion were encouraged.

Nelson's portrait of his wife won the prize for the best portrait in the Royal Academy Summer Exhibition of 1947. His portraits of Cambridge intellectuals, G. M. Trevelyan and E. M. Forster and cricketers such as C. B. Fry now hang in the Committee Room at Lord's.

After retirement in 1970, the Nelsons moved to Selsey in Sussex. His wife died in 1997 and Nelson spent his final years living in Surrey, where he continued to lead an active life, driving his car until 2 months before he died.
