= Hardacre Theater =

- U.S. National Register of Historic Places
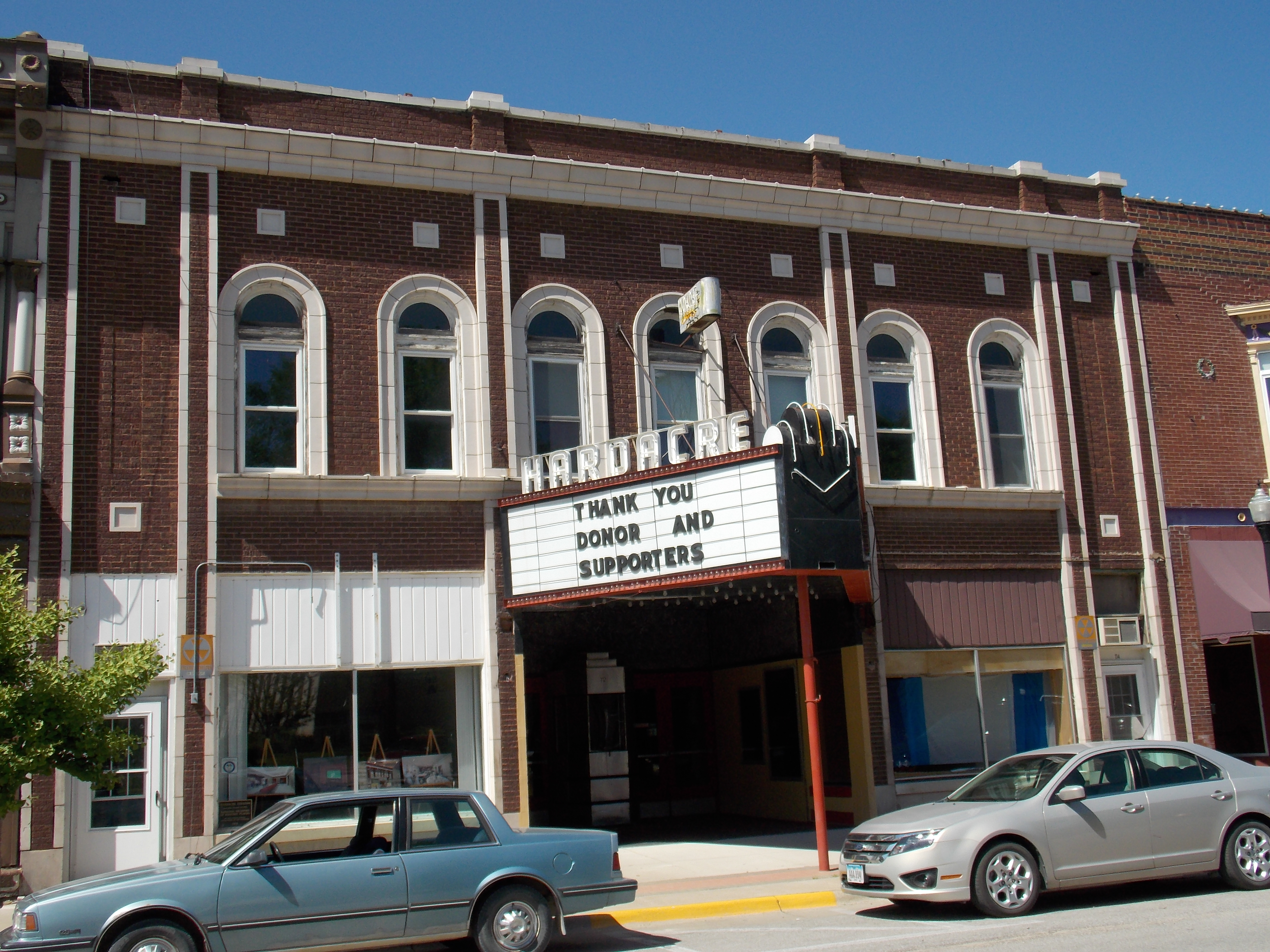

- Location within Iowa Location within the United States
- Location: 112 E. 5th St. Tipton, Iowa
- Coordinates: 41°46′13″N 91°07′40″W
- Area: less than one acre
- Built: 1914
- Built by: Connell Company; Western Construction Company
- Architectural style: Renaissance Revival
- NRHP reference No.: 15000951
- Added to NRHP: January 5, 2016

The Hardacre Theater is a historic building located in the central business district of Tipton, Iowa, United States. The theater was originally built as an opera house and its construction was funded by the estate of Jacob Hardacre. Hardacre was a member of a fraternal organization, the Independent Order of Odd Fellows (I.O.O.F.), and it was stipulated that the building was to be used for their functions as well. The theater was opened in 1914, and it was converted into a movie house in 1919. There is seating for 264 on the main floor and an additional 132 seats in the balcony. The present marquee was erected by the Iowa Neon Sign Company of Des Moines in 1948. The I.O.O.F. sold the theater to Louie and Virginia Cook in 1978. It continued to serve as a movie theater, and it hosted its own film festival until it closed in August 2013. The Hardacre Theater Preservation Association bought the theater in 2014. They are renovating the theater to accommodate digital movie equipment, to return it to a live performing arts theater, and to provide space to host community events. It was listed on the National Register of Historic Places in 2016.
