= Richard Bromley =

Sir Richard Madox Bromley (11 June 1813 – 30 November 1865) was an English civil servant.

== Life ==
Bromley traced his descent to Sir Thomas Bromley (1530–1587), Lord High Chancellor of England in the reign of Elizabeth. He was the second son of Samuel Bromley, surgeon in the Royal Navy, and Mary, daughter of Tristram Maries Madox of Greenwich, and was born on 11 June 1813. He was educated at Lewisham grammar school, and in 1829 entered the Admiralty department of the civil service.

In 1846 Bromley was appointed to visit the dockyards on a confidential mission, shortly after which he was named accountant to the Burgoyne commission on the Irish famine. Here the system which he introduced into the accounts had the effect of bringing more than half a million sterling back to the exchequer, and attracted the attention of the House of Commons. The success with which he had discharged his duties led to his being in 1848 appointed secretary to the commission for auditing the public accounts, in which he introduced improvements which in a great degree remodelled the working of the department. From this period he was frequently employed on special commissions of inquiry into public departments, including that appointed in 1849 for a revision of the dockyards, and that of 1853 on the contract packet system.

On the outbreak of hostilities with Russia he was appointed accountant-general of the navy, the affairs of which he administered with marked ability and success, and in September 1854 was made a civil Companion of the Bath. In 1858 he was created Knight Commander of the Bath. On retirement from his office through ill-health he was on 31 March 1863 appointed a commissioner of Greenwich Hospital. He died on 30 November 1865.
