= Matthias Gray =

American music publisher (1829–1887)

Matthias Gray (1829–1887) was a music publisher in the United States.

He had a business at 105 Kearny Street in San Francisco. His was "one of the most distinguished music publishers in the city." He was the proprietor of Gray's Music Store

In November 1873 his business was advertised with music stores at 623/625 Clay Street in San Francisco and at 101 First Street in Portland Oregon. The ad in the Los Angeles Herald noted they sold organs, pianos, brass and string instruments. It touted the business as "the only music publisher on the West Coast."

Overland Monthly reported news songs received from Gray. Publishers Weekly also noted Gray's song releases.

The first store opened in 1852 on Washington Street. The business moved to Clay Street, then Oearney, to White House, and finally to four-story buildings at 206 and 208 Post Street where they had showrooms, a music hall, classrooms, and repair space.

== Sheet music ==
- "Temperance Song and Chorus. The Lips That Touch Liquor Shall Never Touch Mine"
- "The G. W. York Academic March"
- "El jaleo de Jerez" (1873)
- "Alexandrina" by Manuel y Ferrer
