= John Starkey (Canterbury MP) =

16th-century English politician

John Starkey (by 1503–1554), of Canterbury, Kent, was an English politician.

== Family ==
Starkey was the son of Thomas Starkey of Canterbury. He married a woman named Agnes, and they had one son.

== Career ==
Starkey, a yeoman, was active in local politics and was a common councilman of Canterbury by 1529, Sheriff of Canterbury for 1529–30, an alderman by 1534, chamberlain from 1534 to 1537 and mayor of the city for 1538–39.

He was elected a Member of Parliament for Canterbury 1539, during the reign of Henry VIII.
