= Sheriff of Canterbury =

The Sheriff of Canterbury is a shrievalty in the city of Canterbury, England. The office was first held in 1461 by Richard Carpenter, when a charter of king Edward IV granted the city the perpetual status of a county independent of Kent itself. The role was at that time involved in police and legal functions (overseeing public executions, collecting taxes and having powers of arrest), but is now honorific. The role survived the local government reorganisation of 1974, when a large number of other areas lost County Borough status and thus had their Sheriffs' posts abolished, and the Sheriff is still elected at the Annual Council Meeting in May. Canterbury City Council in 2002 merged the role of deputy Chairman of the Council into that of Sheriff, to create a Civic Team of only the Sheriff and the Lord Mayor.

== List of holders ==
- 1461 Richard Carpenter :first Sheriff of Canterbury
- 1462 Hamon Bele
- 1463 John Bygge
- 1464 John Wattys
- 1465 William Bele
- 1466 Walter Hopton
- 1467 Richard Carpenter
- 1468 John Bygge
- 1469 Thomas Atte Wode
- 1470 William Faunt
- 1471 Nicholas Sheldewych
- 1522 Robert Lewys : MP for Canterbury, 1539 and 1545
- 1529 John Starky : MP for Canterbury, 1539
- 1530 Francis Rutland
- 1531 James Thomson
- 1532 John Johnson
- 1533 John Toftos
- 1534 John Alcock
- 1535 John Hobbys
- 1536 Thomas Calowe
- 1537 George Webbe : MP for Canterbury, 1553
- 1538 William Copyn : MP for Canterbury, 1553 and 1554
- 1539 Henry Gere
- 1540 John Fuller
- 1541 Robert Brown
- 1542 Thomas Batherste
- 1543 Roger Welles
- 1544 John Twyne : headmaster of the newly reconstituted King's School in 1542, MP for Canterbury, 1553 and 1554.
- 1549 George Maye : MP for Canterbury, 1559
- 1551 Thomas Walker
- 1563 Anthony Webbe : MP for Canterbury, 1572
- 1572 Bartholomew Brome : MP for Canterbury, 1589
- 1575 Bartholomew Brome : MP for Canterbury, 1589

== 18th century ==
- 1700 George Hall
- 1701 John Friend
- 1702 Thomas Lineall
- 1703 William Pysing
- 1704 Edward Hayward
- 1705 William Bolting
- 1706 Stephen Browne
- 1707 John Garratt
- 1708 John Parker
- 1709 Daniel Hall
- 1710 Michael Fowle
- 1711 William Edridge
- 1712 John Greenland
- 1713 Thomas Loftie
- 1714 Edward Charlton
- 1715 ?
- 1716 Thomas Bullock
- 1717 Thomas Fowle
- 1718 Richard Picard
- 1719 William Browning
- 1720 William Frances
- 1721 William Harris
- 1722 Thomas Gray
- 1723 John Tolputt
- 1724 John Rigden
- 1725 Richard Young
- 1726 William Reynolds
- 1727 John Berry
- 1728 Charles Knowler
- 1729 John Wear
- 1730 William Carter
- 1731 Charles Eve
- 1732 William Rigden
- 1733 Richard Jenkin
- 1734 Thomas Walker
- 1735 John Watts
- 1736 James Tonge
- 1737 Henry Parker
- 1738 Thomas Denne
- 1739 Joseph Sawkins
- 1740 Joseph Greenland
- 1741 Mark Thomas
- 1742 Edward Hayward
- 1743 John Davison
- 1744 William Cooke
- 1745 Richard Botting
- 1746 Thomas Johnson
- 1747 John Wallis
- 1748 Valentine Cantis
- 1749 John Toker
- 1750 Thomas Creed
- 1751 Samuel Johnson
- 1752 Edward Scudamore
- 1753 William Reynolds
- 1754 John Robinson
- 1755 William Rucke
- 1756 William Adams
- 1757 Stephen Pilcher
- 1758 John Buckhurst
- 1759 Thomas Smith
- 1760 Hercules Hills
- 1761 Edward Miller
- 1762 Henry Hatcher
- 1763 William Long
- 1764 Thomas Young
- 1765 Laurence Tuck
- 1766 George Lacy
- 1767 John Taddy
- 1768 John Halbert
- 1769 Thomas Hammond
- 1770 Stephen Richards
- 1771 Hopkins Francis
- 1772 James Simmons
- 1773 Thomas Elwyn
- 1774 Arthur Skeero Lofty
- 1775 Thomas Marsh
- 1776 Thomas Noble
- 1777 Richard Staines
- 1778 Cyprian Rondeau Bunce
- 1779 Richard Halford
- 1780 Richard Harris Barham
- 1781 Thomas Stringer
- 1782 Samuel Balderston
- 1783 Richard Elwin
- 1784 Edward Crayford
- 1785 Henry Gipps
- 1786 John Baker : MP for Canterbury, 1796, 1797 and 1802
- 1787 John Hollingbery Stringer
- 1788 Thomas Hammond the younger
- 1789 Richard Frend
- 1790 John Hodges
- 1791 Daniel Stock
- 1792 Richard Mount
- 1793 Thomas Starr
- 1794 Thomas Parker
- 1795 Henry Simmons
- 1796 Samuel Lepine
- 1797 Thomas Edwards Salmon
- 1798 William Hutt
- 1799 Jesse White

== 19th century ==
- 1800 William Wilcox
- 1801 John Cooper
- 1802 William Jones
- 1803 Charles Pont
- 1804 James Claris
- 1805 John Browne
- 1806 John James Peirce
- 1807 James Warren
- 1808 George Elwin
- 1809 Thomas Starr
- 1810 Robert John Sprakeling
- 1811 James Lawrence
- 1812 Clough Leese
- 1813 Stephen Couchman
- 1814 Thomas Hooker
- 1815 Russell Whitebread Lavender
- 1816 John Clements
- 1817 John Nutt
- 1818 Hammond Nicholls
- 1819 William Sharp
- 1820 Larkin, Allan
- 1821 Samuel Powell
- 1822 George Wood
- 1823 John Thomas Linford
- 1824 William Mercurius Baskerville
- 1825 Russell Whitebread Lavender
- 1826 William Sharp
- 1827 George White
- 1828 Thomas Hart
- 1829 James Dalmar
- 1830 John Weeks
- 1831 James Ridout
- 1832 William Philpot
- 1833 Richard Minter Mount
- 1834 Thomas Tolbut Pope
- 1835 James Read Reader
- 1836 William Ruglyn
- 1837 Thomas T DeLassaux
- 1838 Jacob Mills Davey
- 1839 James Fyfe
- 1840 George Cooper
- 1841 Richard F Beioley
- 1842 Thomas Wilkinson
- 1843 Charles Brock
- 1844 Joseph Jackson
- 1845 Frederick F Cobb
- 1846 William James Cooper
- 1847 Robert George Chipperfield
- 1848 William Sladden
- 1849 Thomas Pauli DeLassaux
- 1850 George Wall
- 1851 Robert Walker
- 1852 Thomas Thorpe DeLassaux
- 1853 Joseph Jackson
- 1854 John George Drury
- 1855 John Brent, jun.
- 1856 William Welby
- 1857 William Cannon, jun.
- 1858 George Harrison
- 1859 Thomas White Collard
- 1860 Herbert T Sankey
- 1861 Bartlett Allen Chambers
- 1862 Allen Fielding
- 1863 Francis Read Bateman
- 1864 Henry Hart
- 1865 George Grace
- 1866 Thomas Boorman
- 1867 Thomas T DeLassaux
- 1868 Alfred Cooley
- 1869 Alfred James Beer
- 1870 William Henry Linom
- 1871 James Coppin
- 1872 Frederick Root
- 1873 Charles Goulden
- 1874 James Dance
- 1875 Edward Reyner
- 1876 William Mount
- 1877 Henry Miskin
- 1878 George Royle Frend
- 1879 Francis R Bateman
- 1880 William Robert Young
- 1881 Thomas Cross
- 1882 Henry Bell Wilson
- 1883 Thomas Wells
- 1884 John Ed Wiltshier
- 1885 Samuel Prentice
- 1886 William Watson Mason
- 1887 Thomas Burren
- 1888 Charles William Allen
- 1889–1890 William R Harris
- 1891 Samuel Will Dean
- 1892 Samuel S Warren
- 1893 Frederick Kennett
- 1894 George Herbert Frend
- 1895 William John Russell
- 1896–1897 Edward Lukey
- 1898 Edward George Stead
- 1899 Stephen Horsley

== 20th century ==
- 1900 George Pope
- 1901 Frederick Thomas Gentry
- 1902 Julian Frank Whicheard
- 1903 William Horne
- 1904 Frederick John Godden
- 1905 Thomas Wood
- 1906 Thomas Bourne
- 1907 Robert William Whittaker
- 1908 Albert William Anderson
- 1910 Herbert John Belsey
- 1911 Edward Vincent Dean
- 1912 Albert Shreeves Paine
- 1913 John Gilbert Johnson
- 1914 William George Dickens
- 1915 James Benn
- 1916 Fortescue West
- 1917 L. A. Philpot
- 1918 A. Pentecost
- 1919 Charles Richardson
- 1920 Robert H Arrowsmith
- 1921 James McClemens
- 1922 Percy Robert Finn
- 1923 Lucy Green Wells
- 1924 Charles W. R. Philips
- 1925 John Fuller Lamb
- 1926 Albert E. Vandersteen
- 1927 Frank Hooker
- 1928 Walter Richard Pierce
- 1929 Frank Wood
- 1930 Violet May Williamson
- 1931 Edward Reginald Crow
- 1932 John William Edwards
- 1933 James Partridge
- 1934 Alfred Baynton
- 1935 John Bernard Thompson
- 1936 Herbert Rigden
- 1937 William Frederick Simpson
- 1938 George Robert Barrett
- 1939 Gerald Montague Kingsford
- 1940 Norman Haigh Wightwick
- 1942 Evelyn Mary Hews
- 1943 Augustus Wallace Fowler
- 1944 John George Bosworth Stone
- 1945 Percy Botting
- 1946 Harold Pullen Dawton
- 1947-1949 William Henry Chessell
- 1949 Thomas Baglin White
- 1950 Thomas Edward Carling
- 1951 John Robert Barrett
- 1952 William Stephen Bean
- 1953 Harry Martin Kenny
- 1954 Stanley Herbert Jennings
- 1955 William Thomas
- 1957 Peter Lewis Wood
- 1958 Miriam Alice Sharp
- 1959 Gilbert H.G. Kennett (Died 23 May 1959 and replaced by Ernest Edward Kingsman)
- 1960 Edwin George Shersby
- 1961 Clive Frederick Pare
- 1962 Edward Cecil Ferguson Brown
- 1963 Cyril Alfred Leslie Ash
- 1964 Arthur Vivian Wilson
- 1965 Kenneth George Hills
- 1966 Herbert Joseph Buckworth
- 1967 Kathleen Mary Ellis
- 1968 Ellen Mary Rothermel
- 1969 Bernard Augustine Porter
- 1970 Leonard Roy Bennett
- 1971 Mary Ross Keith-Lucas (née Hardwicke)
- 1972 Rita Iris Patricia Kilvert
- 1973 Michael Frederick Fuller
- 1974 Gwendolen Edna Fortune MBE
- 1975 Margo Elizabeth Brown
- 1976 John Henry Snell
- 1977 Sidney George Donnithorne
- 1978 Arthur Ronald Palmer
- 1979 Leslie John Claud Stockwell
- 1980 John Trent
- 1981 John D Holgate
- 1982 Ignatius B Dempsey
- 1983 Harry Victor Legg
- 1984 Douglas A Fenn
- 1985 Tom Steele
- 1986 Brian P Rye
- 1987 Douglas R Gomm
- 1988 Robin Gregory
- 1989 William Arthur Wildman
- 1990 Patrick Burke
- 1991 Bernard Collins
- 1992 Iris Law
- 1993 Ron Flaherty
- 1994 Andrew Frogley
- 1995 Maiser Seager
- 1996 Martin Fisher
- 1997 Philip Bond
- 1998 Kate Panton
- 1999 Michael Street-Williams

== 21st century ==
- 2000 Jennie Bukht
- 2001 Jennifer Yonge
- 2002 Brian Hunter
- 2003 Fred Whitemore
- 2004 Richard Parkinson
- 2005 Lewis Norris
- 2006 Jeanne Harrison
- 2007 Gillian Reuby
- 2008 Charlotte MacCaul
- 2009 Gabrielle Davis
- 2010 Sally Pickersgill
- 2011 Hazel McCabe
- 2012 Heather Taylor
- 2013 (Elizabeth) Ann Taylor
- 2015 Robert Jones
- 2016 Rosemary Doyle
- 2017 Colin Spooner
- 2018 Jeanette Stockley
- 2019 Jeanette Stockley
- 2020 Anne Dekker
- 2021 Anne Dekker
- 2022 Louise Harvey-Quirke
- 2023 Tom Mellish
- 2024 Keji Moses
- 2025 Steph Jupe

== See also ==
- Mayors of Canterbury
