= John Bridges (MP) =

16th-century English politician

John Bridges, Brigges or A Bregges (by 1488 – 29 November 1537), of Canterbury, Kent, was an English politician.

== Family ==
Bridges was married to Agnes Hales.

== Career ==
Bridges was a brewer who was Mayor of Canterbury for 1520–21, 1524–25 and 1534–35. He was elected a member of parliament for Canterbury in 1523, 1529 and 1536.
