= James Simmons (1741–1807) =

James Simmons (22 January 1741 – 22 January 1807) was a newspaper proprietor, bookseller, banker and business entrepreneur. He was a politician who was active in local government in Canterbury and sat in the House of Commons from 1806 to 1807.

== Biography ==
Simmons was born in Canterbury, the son of William Simmons, a 'Peruke' or wig maker in the city. He attended the King's School, Canterbury between 1749 and 1755 and then served an apprenticeship as a stationer in London from 1757. He obtained his freedom in 1764. In 1767 he became a freeman of Canterbury by 'patrimony' and went into business as a stationer.

In 1768, Simmons set up a bi-weekly newspaper the Kentish Gazette in rivalry with the long-standing Kentish Post whose new proprietor had refused an offer of partnership. After a four-week local trade war, which also involved two other Canterbury printers and stationers William Flackton and Thomas Smith, Kirkby agreed terms and went into a long-term partnership with Simmons. The firm traded in the High Street and later at the King's Arms Printing Off & Library, St George's Street.

As well as newspaper proprietors, they were stationers, bookbinders, printers and publishers, ran a circulating library, and sold patent medicines.

== Politics ==
Simmons was actively involved in local politics. He was elected to the Common Council in 1769, served as Sheriff of Canterbury for 1772-73 and was elected an Alderman in 1774. He served his first term as Mayor of Canterbury in 1776. Between 1787 and 1791 he was a prime mover in the Pavement Commission which was established by Act of Parliament 'For the Better Paving, Cleansing, Lighting and Watching of Canterbury'. Simmons acted as Treasurer to the Commission. In his second term as Mayor, Simmons oversaw further modernization, such as the establishment of a new market building (the Buttermarket) and the demolition of several of the medieval city gates. He was also responsible for the purchase and landscaping of the Dane John Gardens within the walls of Canterbury, which is still an important civic open space.

In addition to the book trade, Simmons's business interests included an appointment as Distributor of Stamps for East Kent (1782) and the creation, in partnership with Henry Gipps, of the Canterbury Bank which eventually merged with Lloyds Bank in 1918. The Bank was situated on the corner of St Margaret's Street and High Street on the same site as the present Lloyds Bank.

In 1791 Simmons set up in business as a miller. He built a completely new Abbot's Mill on the River Stour, which was designed by John Smeaton.

A further venture was an unsuccessful plan to promote a canal from Canterbury to the sea at Reculver. After Simmons's death, an attempt was made to launch a canal company under an enabling act in 1811. The project was eventually abandoned in 1825 when George Stephenson's Canterbury and Whitstable Railway was being planned.

Simmons was elected as one of the two Members of Parliament for Canterbury in the General Election in October 1806. He did not serve as an MP for very long as he died aged 66 in London in 1807 and was buried in St Mildred's Churchyard in Canterbury.

Simmons married Charlotte Mantell of Tenterden in 1776.

Parliament of the United Kingdom
| Preceded by George Watson; John Baker | Member of Parliament for Canterbury; 1806 – 1807; With: John Baker | Succeeded by Samuel Sawbridge; John Baker |
