= Abraham Colfe =

English philanthropist and vicar

Abraham Colfe (7 Aug 1580 – 5 Dec 1657) was vicar of Lewisham from 1610 to 1657 and a notable English philanthropist, founding Colfe's School, a reading (primary) or Latin school and five almshouses for the inhabitants of Lewisham (today, part of south-east London). The school later came to bear his name.

Colfe declared that the aim of the school was to provide an education for "pupils of good wit and capacity and apt to learn". His original vision was to educate the children of "the hundred of Blackheath", today, most of the pupils come from the four boroughs which surround the school.

Colfe invited the Leathersellers' Company, one of the oldest of the city Livery Companies, to be a trustee of his will. Links between the school and the company are strong. The official visitor to the school is Prince Michael of Kent. There is no image of Colfe in existence.

== Colfe's will ==
According to Daniel Lysons' account in Environs of London (1796):

"By his will he gives the following directions relating to this school: that it shall be for the education of thirty-one boys, five of whom shall be of the parish of Lewisham; ten of Greenwich, eight of Deptford, one of Lee, one of Charlton, three of Eltham, and three of Woolwich, to be chosen in the several parishes at a public meeting of the chief parishioners. In addition to this number, every incumbent minister in the hundred of Blackheath, and also the minister of Chislehurst, to have the privilege of sending their sons to the school for education, but no minister to have more than one son in the school at a time. The master is to be examined and approved by the head masters of Westminster, St. Paul's, and Merchant Taylors' schools, by the president of Sion College, the ministers of the hundred of Blackheath, and the minister of Chislehurst; and to be chosen by them, in conjunction with the wardens of the Leathersellers' Company, and the lord of the manor...."

Colfe's will also made provisions for scholarships from the school to allow able pupils to study at Oxford or Cambridge University.

== Foundation of the almshouses ==
"Mr. Colfe directed also, by his will, that a certain sum of money should be laid out in building five alms-houses, (to be begun in the month of April 1662,) for poor, godly householders of this parish, 60 years of age or upwards, and able to say the Creed, the Lord's Prayer, and the Ten Commandments. ... These alms-houses are on the west side of the village of Lewisham, to the south of the church. Over the door are the arms of the founder, and of the Leathersellers' Company."
