= Thomas Atwode =

English politician

Thomas Atwode (Awode, Wode, Wodde) (by 1469 – 1532), of Canterbury, Kent, was an English politician.

Atwode was born by 1469, the third son of Thomas Atwode, who died in 1498. The family were from Canterbury, and his brother, William Atwode, was also an MP. Atwode was educated at Gray's Inn.

Atwode married Margaret Moyle, a daughter of the MP John Moyle of Eastwell.

He was an alderman of Canterbury by 1500, chamberlain from 1500 to 1503 and mayor for 1504–05, 1512–13 and 1530–31.

Atwode was a Member of Parliament for Canterbury 1504, 1510, 1515, and 1529.

On his death he was buried in the chapel which he had built in the church of St. Mildred, Canterbury.
