= Sir John Honywood, 4th Baronet =

English politician

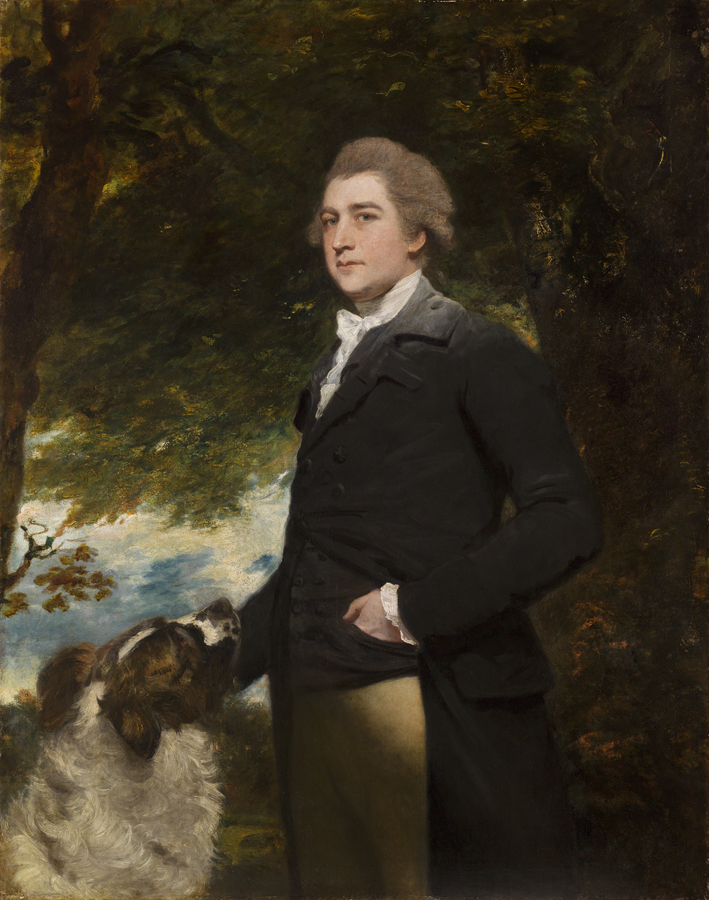
Painting of Honywood in 1784 By Joshua Reynolds

Sir John Honywood, 4th Baronet (1757–1806), of Evington, Kent, was an English politician.

He was the eldest son of William Honywood and the grandson of Sir John Honywood 3rd Bt., from whom he inherited the baronetcy in 1781.

He was a member of Parliament for Steyning in 1784 – July 1785 and 17 Apr. 1788 – 1790; for Canterbury in 1790–1796 and 10 Mar. 1797 – 1802 and for Honiton in 1802 – 29 Mar. 1806.

He died in 1806. He had married Frances, the daughter of William Courtenay, 2nd Viscount Courtenay, with whom he had a son and 6 daughters. He was succeeded by his son, Sir John Courtenay Honywood, 5th Baronet.

Baronetage of England
Preceded by John Honywood	Baronet (of Evington); 1781–1806	Succeeded by John Honywood
