= Burgoyne =

Burgoyne is a surname introduced to England following the Norman Conquest of 1066, which denoted someone from Burgundy (Bourgogne in French). Notable people with the name include:

- Alan Burgoyne (1880–1929), British lieutenant-colonel, politician and writer
- Bill Burgoyne (1946–1999), New Zealand rugby league player
- Diana Burgoyne (born 1957), Canadian artist
- Eileen Burgoyne (1915–2013), British Cold War spy
- Frank J. Burgoyne (1858–1913), British librarian and author
- Grant Burgoyne (1953), American attorney and politician
- Harry Burgoyne (1996), English footballer
- Hugh Burgoyne (1833–1870), Irish Royal Naval officer awarded the Victoria Cross, son of John Fox Burgoyne
- Jacqueline Burgoyne (1944–1988), British sociologist and academic
- James Burgoyne (born 1980), English former cricketer
- Jase Burgoyne (born 2003), Australian rules footballer
- John Burgoyne (disambiguation), including:
  - John Burgoyne (1722–1792), British general during the American Revolutionary War, father of John Fox Burgoyne
  - John Fox Burgoyne (1782–1871), British Army field marshal, son of John Burgoyne, father of Hugh Talbot Burgoyne
- Joshua Burgoyne (born 1989), Australian politician
- Leigh Burgoyne (born 1939), Australian molecular biologist
- Leilani Tamu, née Burgoyne, New Zealand poet and politician
- Martin Burgoyne (c. 1963–1986), British and American artist, a key figure in singer Madonna's early career
- Mike Burgoyne (ice hockey) (born 1989), Canadian ice hockey player
- Mike Burgoyne (rugby union) (1951–2016), New Zealand rugby union player
- Mindie Burgoyne, American writer and businessperson
- Montagu Burgoyne (1750–1836), British politician, son of Sir Roger Burgoyne, 6th Baronet
- Olga Burgoyne (1878–1974), American dancer, actress and businesswoman
- P. B. Burgoyne (1844–1929), English wine merchant, entrepreneur
- Peter Burgoyne (born 1978), Australian rules footballer, brother of Shaun Burgoyne
- Peter Burgoyne (cricketer) (born 1993), English cricketer and darts player
- Robert D. Burgoyne (born 1953), British physiologist and neuroscientist
- Burgoyne baronets:
  - Sir Roger Burgoyne, 2nd Baronet (1618–1677), Member of Parliament for Bedfordshire
  - Sir Roger Burgoyne, 4th Baronet (died 1716)
  - Sir Roger Burgoyne, 6th Baronet (1710–1780), Member of Parliament for Bedfordshire
- Shaun Burgoyne (born 1982), Australian rules footballer, brother of Peter Burgoyne
- Tanya Burgoyne, American politician elected in 2024
- Thomas Burgoyne (disambiguation)
- Victoria Burgoyne (born 1953), British actress
- William Burgoyne (Chancellor of the Duchy of Lancaster) - see List of chancellors of the Duchy of Lancaster (1400–1404)
- William Burgoyne (academic) (died 1523), priest and academic at Cambridge
- William Burgoyne (cricketer) (born 1942), cricketer for Berkshire

== See also ==
- Bourgoin (surname)
