= High Sheriff of Bedfordshire =

Civil post in Bedfordshire, England

- Incumbent; Ismail Anilmis since 27 March 2026
- County of Bedfordshire
- Reports to: The Crown
- Nominator: Incumbent with input from the County Nomination Panel
- Appointer: Privy Council by the Sovereign
- Term length: 1 year
- Constituting instrument: Sheriffs Act 1887
- First holder: Aelfstan (pre-1042)
- Salary: Unpaid
- Website: highsheriffofbedfordshire.org

This is a list of high sheriffs of Bedfordshire.

== Pre-Conquest ==
pre-1042: Aelfstan

1042–1066; Godric, Ralph Talgebose Bondi the Staller

== 1066–1125 ==
- 1066-c.1084: Ansculf de Picquigny
- Ralph Taillebois
- c. 1080 Hugh de Beauchamp
- 1124 Richard of Winchester

From 1125 through the end of 1575, appointees to the shrievalty held the joint office of High Sheriff of Bedfordshire and Buckinghamshire.

== 1575–1599 ==
- 15 November 1575: George Rotheram
- 13 November 1576: John Barnardiston
- 27 November 1577: George Kensham
- 17 November 1578: John Spencer
- 23 November 1579: Nicholas Luke
- 21 November 1580: Henry Butler
- 27 November 1581: John Thomson
- 5 December 1582: Richard Conquest (1st term)
- 25 November 1583: Lewis Dyve
- 19 November 1584: John Rowe
- 29 August 1585: Richard Charnocke (1st term)
- 22 November 1585: Oliver St John
- 14 November 1586: Richard Charnocke (2nd term)
- 4 December 1587: William Butler
- 29 November 1588: Ralph Astrye
- 24 November 1589: Oliver St John, of Stanfordburgh
- 24 November 1590: George Rotheram
- 25 November 1591: Christopher Hoddesdon
- 16 November 1592: William Duncombe
- 26 November 1593: Nicholas Luke
- 21 November 1594: John Dyve
- 27 November 1595: William Gostwick
- 22 November 1596: Richard Conquest (2nd term)
- 25 November 1597: Thomas Cheyney
- 28 November 1598: Edward Radclyffe
- 2 December 1599: William Butler, of Biddenham

== 1600–1699 ==
- 24 November 1600: Sir John Crofts
- 2 December 1601: Richard Charnock (3rd term)
- 7 December 1602: George Francklin
- 1 December 1603: Sir John Dyve
- 5 November 1604: John Lee
- 2 February 1606: Sir Edwin Sandys
- 17 November 1606: Sir Francis Anderson
- 9 November 1607: Sir Thomas Snagge
- 12 November 1608: Edmund Mordaunt
- 1609: Thomas Austell
- 6 November 1610: Sir Francis Ventris
- 1611: Sir Robert Sandy, 1st Baronet
- 1612: William Beecher
- 1613: Richard Saunders
- 1614: Sir Edward Duncombe
- 6 November 1615: Sir William Plomer
- 11 November 1616: Roger Burgoyne
- 6 November 1617: Sir Oliver Luke
- 9 November 1618: Sir Edmund Conquest
- 1619: George Keynsham
- 6 November 1620: Sir Francis Staunton
- 1621: William Briars
- 7 November 1622: William Hawkins
- 1623: Sir Francis Clarke
- 1624: Matthew Denton
- 1625: John Wingate
- 1626: Sir Edward Gostwick, 2nd Baronet
- 6 November 1627: John Moore, of Layton
- 1628: Sir Anthony Chester, 1st Baronet
- 1629: Michael Grigge
- 7 November 1630: William Cater
- 1631: Edmund Anderson
- 1632: James Beverley
- 10 November 1633: Onslow Winch
- 5 November 1634: Humphrey Monoux
- 1635: Richard Gearye
- 3 October 1636: Henry Chester
- 30 September 1637: John Charnock
- 9 October 1637: William Boteler, of Biddenham
- 4 November 1638: William Plomer
- 1639: Richard Child
- 1640: John Burgoyne
- 1641: Sir Thomas Alston, 1st Baronet
- 30 December 1643: William Duncombe, of Battlesden
- 20 January 1644: Humphrey Fishe
- 2 December 1644: Nicholas Denton
- 6 February 1647: Thomas Daniell
- 9 March 1647: Matthias Tailor
- 29 November 1647: William Allen
- 23 November 1648: William Duncombe
- 7 November 1649: Robert Lovett
- 7 November 1650: Sir William Bryers
- 4 November 1651: Thomas Bromsall
- 12 November 1652: John Huxley
- 10 November 1653: Henry Pigott
- 1654: Robert Stanton
- 1655: John Welles
- 1657: Owen Bromsall
- 5 November 1660: Edmund Wilde, of Howton
- 1661: Sir Roger Burgoyne, 2nd Baronet
- 1662: Francis Wingate
- 1663: George Wyan
- 1664: Sir Edward Cater
- 12 November 1665: Thomas Snagge
- 7 November 1666: Sir John Huxley
- 6 November 1667: Sir Henry Massingberd, 1st Baronet
- 6 November 1668: Sir Ralph Bovey, 1st Baronet
- 25 November 1668: De Lawney
- 9 December 1668: Sir Thomas Brounsell, of Biggleswade
- 11 November 1669: Sir Ralph Bovey, 1st Baronet
- 3 November 1670: Richard Wagstaffe
- 9 November 1671: Henry Brandreth
- 11 November 1672: Thomas Bromsall, of Blunham
- 12 November 1673: Matthew Denis
- 5 November 1674: Robert Bell
- 15 November 1675: Samuel Reynardson
- 1675: Francis Dodsworth
- 10 November 1676: Thomas Arnold, of Ampthill
- 15 November 1677: Samuel Reynardson
- 14 November 1678: Thomas Snagge
- 13 November 1679: Sir William Gostwick, 4th Baronet
- 4 November 1680: Villiers Chernock
- 10 November 1681: George Abbott
- 13 November 1682: Sir James Astrey or Astry
- 12 November 1683: William Daniel
- 20 November 1684: Humphrey Fish
- 30 November 1685: Thomas Halpenny or Halfpenny
- 25 November 1686: John Crosse, of Breminger
- 5 December 1687: John Wagstaffe
- 8 November 1688: Ralph Bromsall
- 25 November 1689: Samuel Cater
- 27 November 1690: William Boteler
- 14 December 1691: John Neale
- 17 November 1692: John de la Fontaine
- 28 November 1692: Sir Samuel Thompson
- 16 November 1693: John Eston
- 6 December 1694: Sir Stephen Anderson, 1st Baronet
- 20 December 1694: Sir William Massingberd, 2nd Baronet
- 5 December 1695: William Millard
- 3 December 1696: Robert Bell
- 16 December 1697: Sir John Burgoyne
- 30 December 1697: John Hinde
- 21 January 1698: John Spencer
- 22 December 1698: John de la Fontaine
- 20 November 1699: Sir John Burgoyne, 3rd Baronet

== 1700–1799 ==
- 28 November 1700: William Hillersden
- 1 January 1702: Maurice Abbott
- 12 January 1702: Thomas Bromsall
- 19 January 1702: Thomas Bromsall, of Roxton
- 3 December 1702: Sir Pynsent Chernock, 3rd Baronet
- 14 December 1702: Thomas Johnson
- 2 December 1703: Samuel Ongley
- 21 December 1704: Edward Duncombe
- 3 December 1705: Edward Snagg
- 14 November 1706: John Huxley
- 20 November 1707: Morgan Hinde
- 18 December 1707: John Clarke
- 29 November 1708: John Wright
- 1 December 1709: William Chew
- 24 November 1710: Ralph Brumsell
- 14 June 1711: William Nicholls
- 14 June 1711: John Harvey
- 10 January 1712: Thomas Boswell, of Dean
- 11 December 1712: John Vaux
- 30 November 1713: Thomas Emerton
- 14 November 1714: Thomas Bromsall
- 22 November 1715: John Livesay
- 12 November 1716: Sir Theophilus Napier, 5th Baronet
- 21 December 1717: Sir William Smith
- 21 December 1718: Nicholas Luke
- 7 January 1720: Robert Hind
- 3 January 1721: Richard Orlebar
- 14 December 1721: Henry Brandreth
- 11 December 1722: Robert Abbott
- 7 January 1724: Thomas Aynscombe
- 10 December 1724: Thomas Garth
- 13 January 1726: Joseph Johnson
- 29 November 1726: Theophilus Dillingham
- 16 December 1727: William Coleman, of Cranfield
- 18 December 1728: Benjamin Rhodes
- December 1729: Sir John Napier, 6th Baronet
- 14 December 1730: William Lamb
- 9 December 1731: George Blundell
- 14 December 1732: Henry Southouse, of Ravendon
- 11 January 1733: Edmund Morgan, of Carrington
- 20 December 1733: Hillersden Franks
- 19 December 1734: Thomas Groome, of Dunstable
- 18 December 1735: John Crawley
- 19 January 1737: Francis Jessop, of Bedford
- 12 January 1738: David Willaume, of Tingrith
- 21 December 1738: Oliver Edwards, of Carrington
- 27 December 1739: John Franklin, of Great Barford
- 29 January 1741: John White, of Ewe Green
- 31 December 1741: John Lawson the younger, of Barton
- 19 January 1743: John Coppin, of Market Street
- 7 February 1743: John Miller the younger, of Dunstable
- 5 January 1744: Richard Brown, of Eggington
- 2 February 1744: Andrew Crosse, of Westoning
- 20 February 1744: Hammond Crosse
- 10 January 1745: Richard Bell, of Bedford
- 16 January 1746: Robert Ashwell, of Leighton Buzzard
- 15 January 1747: William Gary, of Bushmead
- 14 January 1748: John Hill, of Bedford
- 11 January 1749: Thomas Crawley, of Dunstable
- 17 January 1750: Thomas Cave, of Bedford
- 6 December 1750: Harry Johnson, of Milton Bryan
- 14 January 1752: Thomas Gilpin
- 7 February 1753: Francis Herne, of Luton
- 31 January 1754: David James, of Ampthill
- 29 January 1755: Thomas Vaux, of Whipsnade
- 27 January 1756: Thomas Smyth, of Streatley
- 4 February 1757: John Capon, of Leighton Buzzard
- 27 January 1758: William Cole, of Sundon
- 2 February 1759: Dennis Farrer Hillersden, of Helvestow
- 1 February 1760: Baker Coleman, of Cranfield
- 28 January 1761: Robert Butcher, of Cople
- 15 February 1762: Simon Taylor, of Woburn
- 4 February 1763: Sir Philip Monoux, 5th Baronet, of Sandy
- 10 February 1764: William Pym, of Hasell Hall
- 1 February 1765: Richard Edwards, of Ardesley
- 17 February 1766: Philip Field, of Barton
- 13 February 1767: Charles Chester, of Tilsworth
- 15 January 1768: John Cater, of Kempston
- 27 January 1769: William Farrer, of Kempston
- 9 February 1770: John Franklin, of Northill
- 6 February 1771: Charles Barnett, of Stratton
- 17 February 1772: Sir Gillies Payne, 2nd Baronet, of Tempsford
- 8 February 1773: John Howard, of Cardington
- 7 February 1774: John Crawley, of Stockwood
- 6 February 1775: George Paunceforth, of Ampthill
- 5 February 1776: Christopher Tower, of Houghton Regis
- 31 January 1777: John Sayer Weal Renal, of Eggington
- 28 January 1778: John Beeches, of Hoobury
- 1 February 1779: Sir Rowland Alston, 6th Baronet, of Odell
- 2 February 1780: William Thornton Astell, of Everton
- 5 February 1781: John Harvey, of Northill
- 1 February 1782: Robert Thornton, of Moggerhanger
- 10 February 1783: John Dilley, of Southill
- 13 February 1784: William Goldsmith, of Strently
- 7 February 1785: William Gibbard, of Sharnbrook
- 13 February 1786: Matthew Rugeley, of Potton
- 12 February 1787: Joseph Partridge, of Cranfield
- 8 February 1788: William Lee Antonie, of Colworth House
- 29 April 1789: Samuel Boydon, of Milton Ernest
- 24 February 1790: James Metcalfe, of Roxton House
- 4 February 1791: Francis Pym, of Hasell Hall
- 3 February 1792: Sir John Buchanan Riddell, 9th Baronet, of Sundon
- 6 February 1793: Thomas Crosse, of Bramingham
- 5 February 1794: Edward Nicoll, of Studham
- 11 February 1795: John Harvey, of Ickwell
- 5 February 1796: George Brooks, of Flitwick
- 1 February 1797: John Higgins the elder, of Turvey
- 7 February 1798: John Fox, of Dean
- 1 February 1799: Robert Trevor, of Flitwick

== 1800–1899 ==
- 5 February 1800: Sir John Everitt, of Westoning
- 11 February 1801: Stephen Raymond, of Potton
- 3 February 1802: John Higgins the younger, of Turvey
- 3 February 1803: Godfrey Thornton, of Moggerhanger
- 1 February 1804: George Edwards, of Henlow Grange
- 6 February 1805: John Polhill, of Renholt
- 1 February 1806: William Long, of Kempston
- 4 February 1807: Sir Philip Monoux, 6th Baronet, of Sandy
- 3 February 1808: Richard Orlebar, of Puddington
- 6 February 1809: Robert Garstin, of Harrold
- 31 January 1810: Sir Gregory Osborne Page-Turner, of Battlesden
- 8 February 1811: Joseph Howell, of Market Street
- 24 January 1812: John Cooper, of Toddington
- 10 February 1813: Richard Parkes, of Luton
- 4 February 1814: Stephen Thornton, of Moggerhanger
- 13 February 1815: Robert Hibbert, of East Hyde
- 12 February 1816: Henry Brandreth, of Houghton Regis
- 12 February 1817: Samuel Crawley, of Stockwood
- 24 January 1818: John Pedley, of Eaton Bray
- 10 February 1819: Samuel Henley-Ongley, of Sandy
- 12 February 1820: Sir John Burgoyne, 9th Baronet, of Sutton
- 22 February 1820: Charles Barnett, of Stratton Park
- 6 February 1821: John Thomas Brooks, of Flitwick
- 4 February 1822: Peter Augustus Lautour, of Little Staughton
- 31 January 1823: Thomas Charles Higgins, of Turvey
- 31 January 1824: Sir Robert Inglis, 2nd Baronet, of Milton Bryan
- 2 February 1825: Samuel Bedford Edwards, of Arlesey
- 30 January 1826: Robert Elliott, of Goldington
- 5 February 1827: George Nigel Edwards, of Henlow Grange
- 13 February 1828: George Musgrave, of Shillington
- 11 February 1829: William Dodge Cooper Cooper, of Toddington
- 2 February 1830: John Thomas Dawson, of Chapham
- 31 January 1831: Samuel Charles Whitbread, of Cardington
- 6 February 1832: Thomas Potter Macqueen, of Ridgmont
- 22 February 1832: Abram Edward Gregory, of Biggleswade
- 4 February 1833: George Pearse, of Harlington
- 3 February 1834: Joseph Morris, of Ampthill
- 7 February 1835: Charles James Metcalfe, of Roxton
- 3 February 1836: Francis Green, of Bedford
- 28 January 1837: William Henry Whitbread, of Southill
- 1 February 1838: John Harvey, of Ickwell
- 4 February 1839: Levi Ames, of East Hyde
- 29 January 1840: William Frederick Brown, of Dunstable
- 5 February 1841: Arthur Macnamara, of Eaton Bray
- 2 February 1842: Robert Lindsell, of Fairfield House
- 1 February 1843: William Sutcliffe, of Great Bramingham
- 31 January 1844: George James Sullivan, of Leagrave
- 3 February 1845: William Bartholomew Higgins, of Turvey
- 30 January 1846: William Stuart, of Aldenham Priory
- 4 February 1847: Robert Newland, of Kempston
- 11 February 1848: Thomas Abbott Green, of Pavenham
- 13 February 1849: Humphrey Brandreth, of Houghton Regis
- 5 February 1850: Richard Thomas Gilpin, of Hockliffe Grange
- 11 February 1851: Charles Gillies Payne, of Blunham
- 2 February 1852: Sir John Burgoyne, 9th Baronet, of Sutton
- 7 February 1853: Henry Littledale, of Kempston Grange
- 30 January 1854: Frederick Charles Polhill-Turner, of Howbury Hall
- 8 February 1855: John Shaw Leigh, of Luton Hoo
- 30 January 1856: Talbot Barnard, of Kempston
- 2 February 1857: Sir George Robert Osborn, 6th Baronet, of Chicksands Priory
- 3 February 1858: John Sambrook Crawley, of Stockwood
- 2 February 1859: Richard Longuet Orlebar, of Hinwick House, Hinwick
- 23 January 1860: Charles Longuet Higgins, of Turvey Abbey
- 4 February 1861: Joseph Tucker, of Pavenham
- 5 February 1862: Crew Alston, of Odell
- 3 February 1863: Benjamin Helps Starey, of Milton Ernest Hall, Milton Ernest
- 3 February 1864: Robert Henry Lindsell, of Biggleswade
- 4 February 1865: Lionel Ames, of East Hyde
- 3 February 1866: Charles Livius Grimshawe, of Aspley Guise
- 2 February 1867: William Cooper Cooper, of Toddington
- 30 January 1868: Sir John Montagu Burgoyne, 10th Baronet, of Sutton
- 4 February 1869: Henry Francis Cockayne Cust, of Cockayne Hatley
- 5 February 1870: John Nathaniel Foster, of Sandy Place
- 8 February 1871: Edward Henry Frederick Dawkins, of Moggerhanger Park
- 5 February 1872: William Francis Higgins, of Turvey House
- 5 February 1873: Harry Thornton, of Kempston
- 2 February 1874: Salusbury Gillies Payne, of Blunham (claiming to be Sir Salusbury Gillies Payne, Baronet)
- 21 February 1874: John Gerard Leigh of Luton
- 4 February 1875: Colonel William Stuart, of Tempsford Hall
- 12 February 1876: George Sowerby, of Putteridge Bury, Luton
- 7 February 1877: Charles Magniac, of Colworth, Sharnbrook
- 22 February 1878: James Howard, of Clapham Park
- 22 February 1879: Thomas Bagnall, jnr., of Milton Ernest
- 16 February 1880: Major John Hatfield Brooks, of Manor House, Flitwick, Ampthill
- 2 March 1881: Joseph Shuttleworth, of Warden, Biggleswade
- 27 February 1882: Francis Bassett, of the Heath, Leighton Buzzard
- 3 March 1883: Julius Alington, of Little Barford
- 4 March 1884: Edward King Fordham, of Ashwell
- 5 March 1885: James Francis Hatfeild Harter, of Cranfield Court
- 8 March 1886: John Edmund Audley Harvey, of Ickwell, Bury, Biggleswade
- 7 March 1887: James Poole Wagstaff, of Manor House, Potton
- 17 March 1888: Theodore Harris, of Leighton Buzzard
- 6 April 1889: George William Francis Sackville Russell, Marquess of Tavistock, of Oakley House
- 21 March 1890: Henry Hilton Green, of Felmersham Grange, Bedford
- 20 March 1891: Frank Shuttleworth, of Old Warden Park, Biggleswade
- 16 March 1892: Col. Thomas Joseph Sunderland, of Ravensden Grange
- 15 March 1893: Anthony Henry Wingfield, of Ampthill House
- 10 March 1894: Edward Earnest Dymond, of Oaklands, Aspley Guise
- 8 March 1895: Capt. Hugh Edmond Browning, of Clapham Park, Bedford
- 6 March 1896: Maj. Charles Villiers Somerville Downes, of Aspley House, Aspley Guise
- 26 February 1897: George James Gribble, of Henlow Grange, Biggleswade
- 7 March 1898: Henry Chernocke Gibbs Brandreth, of Houghton Hall, Houghton Regis
- 7 March 1899: James Harold Howard, of Kempston Grange, Bedford

== 1900–1999 ==
- 1900: Algernon Mercer, of Morhanger Park, Sandy
- 1901: Arthur Macnamara, of Billington Manor, Leighton Buzzard
- 1902: William Clarence Watson, of Colworth House, Sharnbrook
- 1903: Francis Pym, of Hasells Hall, Sandy
- 1904: William Henry Allen, of Bromham House, Bedford
- 1905: William Long Fitzpatrick, of Woodlands, Clapham, Bedford
- 1906: John William Green, of The Larches, Luton
- 1907: Lieutenant-Colonel Geoffrey Howard, of Highfield, Bedford
- 1908: Waller George Halfield Harter, of Kempston Bury, Bedford
- 1909: Sir Algernon Kerr Butler Osborn, of Chicksands Priory, Shefford
- 1910: Albert Edward Bowen, of Colworth House, Sharnbrook
- 1911: Charles Robert Salusbury Payne, of Blunham House, Sandy
- 1912: John Edward Howard, of Clapham Park
- 1913: Frederick George Lomax, of Cockayne Hatley, Potton
- 1914: Thomas Henry Barnard, of The Hoo, Kempston
- 1915: Charles Edmund Argentine-Alington, of Little Barford House, St. Neots
- 1916: Cyril Gurney, of Henlow Grange, Biggleswade
- 1917: Alexander Rowland Alston, of The Tofte, Sharnbrook
- 1918: Howard Spensley, of Westoning Manor, Ampthill
- 1919: John Arnold Whitchurch, of Great Barford House, near Sandy
- 1920: Herbert Owen Williams, of Farley Lynches, Luton
- 1921: Richard William Allen, of The Woodlands, Clapham
- 1922: Robert Edmund Campbell, of Cranfield Court, Woburn Sands
- 1923: John George Murray, of Wrest Park, Silsoe
- 1924: Sir George Lawson Johnston, 1st Baron Luke of Pavenham Bury, Pavenham
- 1925: Harold Gwynne Allen, of The Dene, Woburn Sands, Bletchley
- 1926: Dealtry Charles Part of Houghton Hall, Houghton Regis
- 1927: Lieut.-Col. Harold Augustus Wernher, of Luton Hoo
- 1928: Major Charles Ernest Wells, of Turvey Abbey, Turvey
- 1929: Henry Charles Thomas Hambro, of The Hyde, Luton
- 1930: Horace Stanley Deacon, of Kempston Croft
- 1931: Herbert Brent Grotrian of Knolls, Leighton Buzzard
- 1932: Christopher William Gurney, of Henlow Grange, Biggleswade
- 1933: Ronald Willie Gandar-Dower, of Clifton House, Shefford
- 1934: Brigadier – General William Brooke Thornton, of St. John's, Mogerhanger, Sandy
- 1935: William Alfred Lailey Rowland, of The Heath, Leighton Buzzard
- 1936: Harry Arnold, of The Downs, Luton
- 1937: Robert Skinner, of Bromham Hall, Bromham
- 1938: John Henry Staddon, of Withycombe, Ludlow Avenue, Luton
- 1939: Frank William Crossley-Holland, of Oakwell Park, Dunstable
- 1940: Cyril Claud Dillingham, of 25, Lansdowne Road, Luton
- 1941: Sir (Percy) Malcolm Stewart, 1st Baronet, of The Lodge, Sandy, Bedfordshire, Baronet
- 1942: Vyvian Edwin Goodman, of Samares, Dunstable, Bedfordshire
- 1943: Allan Fergusson Wood, of Mill House, Milton Ernest
- 1944: Lieut.-Colonel Robert Adolphus Lyall, of Flitwick Manor, Flitwick
- 1945: Major-General Thomas Cochrane Newton, of Blunham House, near Bedford
- 1946: Lieutenant-Colonel Mervyn Lyde Chute, of Whipsnade, Dunstable
- 1947: Major Simon Whitbread, of Southill, near Biggleswade
- 1948: Captain Stephen Helps Starey, of Home Farm House, Milton Ernest
- 1949: Thomas Wyatt Bagshawe, of Dunstable
- 1950: Thomas George Breadalbane Morgan-Grenville, of Wootton House
- 1951: Maj. Leigh Pemberton Stedall, of Billington Manor
- 1952: Arthur Thomas Worboys, of Westray
- 1953: Herbert Robert Waller of Barton-in-the-Clay
- 1954: Sir Ronald Stewart, 2nd Baronet, of Maulden Grange
- 1955: Horace Richard Neate of Bedford
- 1956: Richard Charles Oakley of Luton
- 1957: Christopher Herbert Renny Reeves, of Manor Farm, Podington
- 1958: William Kenneth Gwynne Allen, of The Old Manor, Aspley Guise
- 1959: Sir (Archibald) Douglas Gordon, of Buttercups, Biddenham, Bedford
- 1960: Harold George Brightman, of Whitehill Avenue, Luton
- 1961: Hugh de Beauchamp Lawson-Johnston, of Melchbourne Park, Bedford
- 1962: Humphrey Whitbread, of Howard's House, Cardington
- 1963: William Walter Samuel Robertson, of Oakley House, Oakley
- 1964: Sir (James) Reginald Pearson, of "Wyvern," Bloomfield Road, Harpenden, Herts.
- 1965: Lieut.-Colonel Hanmer Cecil Hanbury, of Turvey House, Turvey
- 1966: James Francis Robinson, of Bridge House, Great Barford
- 1967: Leslie George Bowles, of " Queensfield," Silsoe
- 1968: Stanley Broughton, of Bedford Road, Luton
- 1969: Arthur Charles St John Lawson Johnston, 3rd Baron Luke of Odell Manor, Odell
- 1970: Wing Cdr. Oliver J. Wells of Ickwell Grange, Ickwell, Biggleswade
- 1971: Brian Stewart Porter of Holme Lodge, Biggleswade
- 1972: John Lawrence Dickinson of The Old Rectory, Higham Gobion, near Hitchin, Herts
- 1973: Samuel C. Whitbread (H.M.Lord Lieutenant), of Southill Park, Biggleswade
- 1974: Colonel Charles Richard Randall
- 1975: Ronald George Gale (Deceased)
- 1976: David H.C. Harland (Deceased)
- 1977: Dudley William Reeves
- 1978: Edward Dudley Moleworth Peacock (Deceased) of Biddenham, Bedford
- 1979: Peter Wardill (Deceased)
- 1980: John Dandy, of 10 Riverside Towers
- 1981: Michael J Davison of Elsworth Lodge, Elsworth, Cambridgeshire
- 1982: James Bristow, Ramsmede Close, Biddenham, Bedford
- 1983: Gilbert Cecil White Beazley, of Bartlemas Farm
- 1984: Stuart Charles Yalden Farmbrough, of Poynders End, Preston, Hitchin, Hertfordshire
- 1985: Pearl Lawson-Johnston of Woodleys Stud House, Melchbourne
- 1986: Lady Grace Odell of Campton, Shefford
- 1987: Major William Powers, of Toddington Manor.
- 1989: John Hayward Wells of Shelton, Kimbolton, Huntingdon
- 1990: Robin Forbes Willmott of Biddenham, Bedford
- 1991: Jean Skelton of Sharnbrook, Bedford
- 1992: George Phillip Henry James, of Luton
- 1993: Eric Dudley Fountain, (Deceased)
- 1994: Brian Edward Howard of the Glebe House, Cople(deceased)
- 1995: Brian Guy Woodrow of Clifton, Bristol
- 1996: John James Maxwell Glasse, of The Old Rectory, Milton Bryan, Milton Keynes
- 1997: Charles Terence Lousada of Crawley Park, Husborne Crawley
- 1998: Geoffrey Richard Dudley Farr, of Streatley, Luton.
- 1999: Christopher Richard Kilroy, of Oakley House, Oakley

== 2000–present ==
- 2000: Thomas Franey Wells, of Felmersham
- 2001: Fiona Chapman, of Milton Bryan, Milton Keynes
- 2002: Colonel Colin Rees Mason, of Hall End, Wootton
- 2003: Andrew James Rayment of Westoning
- 2004: Clifton Jon Claude Ibbett, of Milton House, Milton Ernest
- 2005: Angela Priscilla Farmbrough
- 2006: Richard Lewin Banks of Sandy
- 2007: Dr Vaughan Robert Southgate
- 2008: Nazir Jessa
- 2009: Cynthia Mary Gresham of Dunstable
- 2010: Daniel Thomas Cecil Hanbury of Turvey
- 2011: Andrew Michael Slack
- 2012: Jack Sapsworth
- 2013: Deborah Inskip of Milton Ernest
- 2014: Colin Osborne
- 2015: Isabelle, Countess of Erroll of Woodbury Hall, Everton, Sandy
- 2016: Charles Whitbread of Southill
- 2017: Vinod Bhagwandas Tailor of Luton
- 2018: Arthur Julian George Polhill of Renhold
- 2019: Cora Meryl Dolling of Luton
- 2020: Susan Jane Lousada of Oakley
- 2021: Eric Masih of Bedford
- 2022: Lady Clifford of Ampthill
- 2023: Russell Alan Beard of Box End
- 2024: Bhavesh Shah of Luton
- 2025: Camilla Anne King of Bromham
- 2026: Ismail Anilmis of Ravensden

== Bibliography ==
- Hughes, A. (1898). List of Sheriffs for England and Wales from the Earliest Times to A.D. 1831. London: Eyre & Spottiswoode. (with amendments of 1963, Public Record Office)
