= François Bourgoing =

François Bourgoing may refer to:

- François Bourgoing (priest) (1585–1662), Superior general of the Congregation of the Oratory in France
- François Bourgoing (Dominican) (died 1589), prior of the Dominicans in Paris
- François Bourgoing (singer), member of the Oratory of Jesus and author on the plain song in use in his order
