= William Burgoyne =

William Burgoyne may refer to:

- William Burgoyne (Chancellor of the Duchy of Lancaster) - see List of chancellors of the Duchy of Lancaster (1400–1404)
- William Burgoyne (academic) (died 1523), priest and academic at Cambridge
- William Burgoyne (cricketer) (born 1942), cricketer for Berkshire
