= John Burgoyne (disambiguation) =

John Burgoyne (1722–1792) was a British army officer in the Saratoga campaign, politician and dramatist.

John Burgoyne may also refer to:

- John Burgoyne (MP for Cambridgeshire) (died c. 1435), MP for Cambridgeshire
- Sir John Fox Burgoyne (1782–1871), senior British Army officer
- Sir John Burgoyne, 1st Baronet (c. 1592–1657), High Sheriff of Bedfordshire, Member of Parliament for Warwickshire 1645–48
- Sir John Burgoyne, 3rd Baronet (c. 1651–1709), High Sheriff of Bedfordshire, one of the Burgoyne baronets
- Sir John Burgoyne, 5th Baronet (c. 1705–1716), one of the Burgoyne baronets
- Sir John Burgoyne, 7th Baronet (1739–1785), general; cousin of Lieutenant-general John Burgoyne.
- Sir John Montagu Burgoyne, 9th Baronet (1796–1858), High Sheriff of Bedfordshire; colonel, of the Burgoyne baronets
- Sir John Montagu Burgoyne, 10th Baronet (1832–1921), of the Burgoyne baronets

== See also ==
- Burgoyne
