= Bourgain =

Bourgain is a surname of French origin. Variants include Burgoyne and Bourgogne.

Notable people with the name Bourgain include:

- Jean Bourgain (1954–2018), Belgian mathematician
- Mickaël Bourgain (born 1980), French track cyclist
