= Bourgoing =

Bourgoing is a French surname held by:

- Dominique Bourgoing (died 1589), French doctor who wrote a journal about Mary, Queen of Scots
- François Bourgoing (Dominican), French member of the Catholic League in the 16th century
- François Bourgoing (priest) (1585–1662), French monk
- Jean-François de Bourgoing (1748–1811), French diplomat
- Paul-Charles-Amable de Bourgoing, French diplomat, son of the former
- Héctor De Bourgoing, Argentine footballer
- Inès de Bourgoing (1862–1953), pioneering French nurse
