= Henry Cheyne, 1st Baron Cheyne =

16th-century English politician and Baron

Henry Cheyne, 1st Baron Cheyne (31 May 1540 – 3 September 1587) was an English politician.

== Career ==
Henry Cheyne was the son of Sir Thomas Cheyne of Shurland in the Isle of Sheppey, Kent, by his second wife, Anne Broughton (d. 16 May 1562), daughter of John Broughton (d. 24 January 1518) of Toddington, Bedfordshire, and Anne Sapcote (d. 14 March 1559), and granddaughter of Sir Robert Broughton by his first wife, Katherine de Vere, said to have been the illegitimate daughter of John de Vere, 13th Earl of Oxford.

Cheyne was trained in the law at Gray's Inn. He inherited his father's estates in Kent in 1558, and his mother's estates in Bedfordshire in 1562. He was knighted in 1563.

He was elected knight of the shire (MP) for Kent from 1562 to 1567 and for Bedfordshire from 1572 until made Baron Cheyne in May 1572. He was appointed High Sheriff of Bedfordshire and Buckinghamshire for 1565.

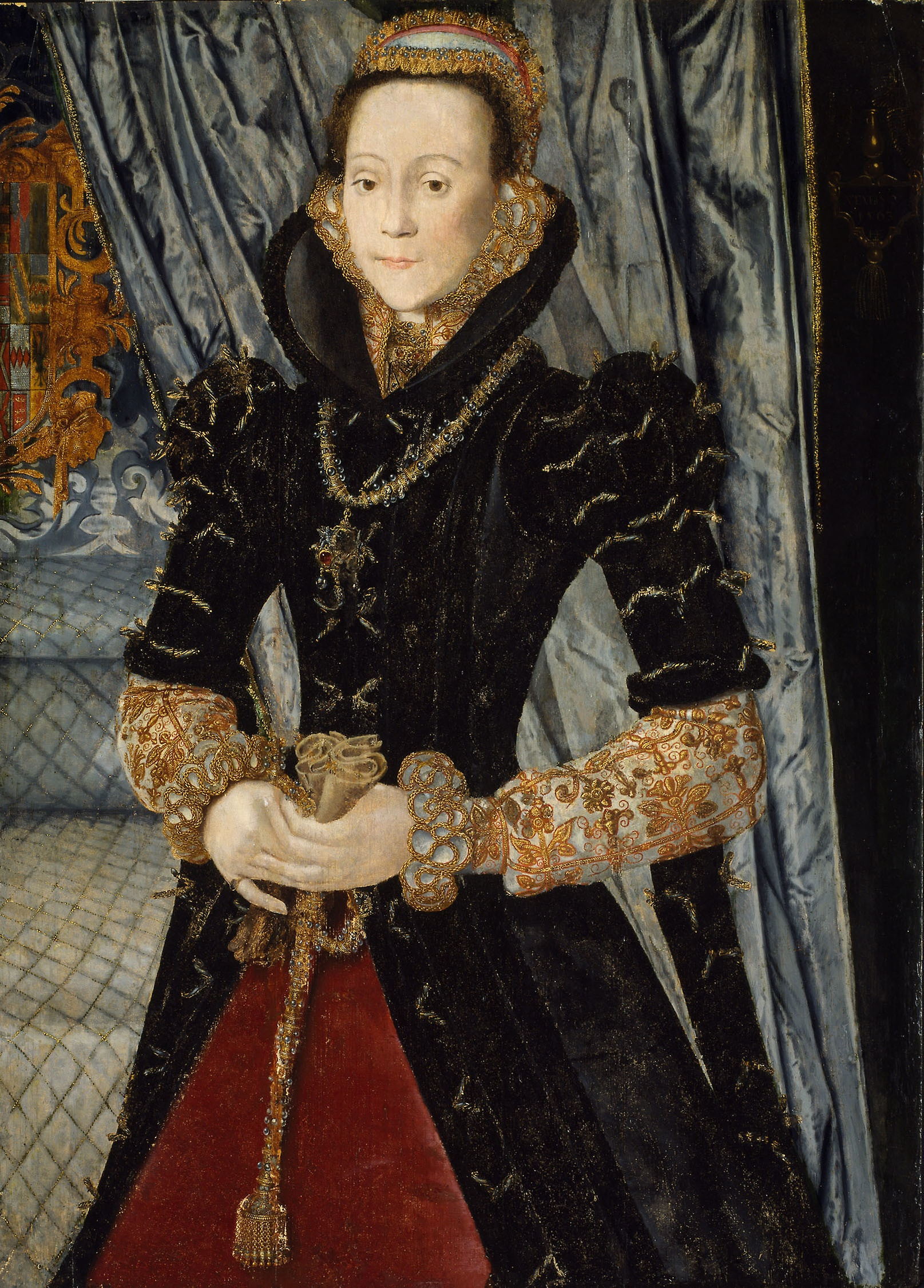
Portrait of a Lady of the Wentworth Family (Probably Jane Cheyne), 1563 by Hans Eworth.

He married Jane, the daughter of Thomas Wentworth, 1st Baron Wentworth. Lady Jane Cheyne gave Elizabeth I a yellow velvet petticoat embroidered with oak leaves as a New Year's Day gift in January 1567.

Henry Cheyne died in 1587 and was buried at Toddington. The title Baron Cheyne became extinct at his death.

Parliament of England
Preceded by George Rotheram; Thomas Snagge	Member of Parliament for Bedfordshire; 1572; With: George Rotheram	Succeeded by George Rotheram; John Thomson
Political offices
Preceded by Thomas Fleetwood	High Sheriff of Bedfordshire and Buckinghamshire; 1565–1566	Succeeded by John Cheyne
Peerage of England
New creation	Baron Cheyne; 1572–1587	Extinct
