= Ralph Bovey =

Sir Ralph Bovey, 1st Baronet (c. 1614–1679) was an English lawyer, landowner, and sheriff who acquired extensive estates across Warwickshire, Cambridgeshire, and London during the 17th century. He is particularly remembered for his funerary monument at Longstowe, which he commissioned from the sculptor John Bushnell and which represents one of the finest examples of Carolean resurrection monuments in England.

== Early life and education ==
Ralph Bovey was the son of Ralph Bovey of London and Ursula Aldworth his wife. He matriculated at St Catharine's College, Cambridge in 1632 but did not graduate. In 1633, he was admitted to Gray's Inn, where he trained as a lawyer.

== Career ==
Bovey became an attorney at the Court of Common Pleas and built a successful legal practice. His wealth allowed him to acquire substantial property holdings across multiple counties. He served as Sheriff of Warwickshire (1652–53) and later Sheriff of Bedfordshire (1669–70). During the 1660s, he stood for Parliament but was not elected.

In recognition of his status and wealth, Bovey was created a baronet in 1660, becoming the 1st Baronet Bovey of Longstowe.

== Estates and property ==
Throughout his career, Bovey systematically acquired land and property. His holdings included:

- Longstowe, Cambridgeshire: His main residence at Stow Hall became his primary seat towards the end of his life
- Old Warden, Bedfordshire: Beginning in 1648, he acquired the lease on Park Grange, the site of the former Wardon Abbey, its precinct, and parts of the Abbot's Garden in a series of transactions spanning nearly 20 years
- Warwickshire: Various properties in his ancestral county
- London: A town house in Holborn

== Personal life ==
Bovey married Mary Maynard, daughter of William Maynard, 1st Baron Maynard, and Lady Anne Maynard of Little Easton, Essex. Mary was baptized on 26 November 1639. The couple had no children together.

However, Bovey also maintained a relationship with his mistress, Elizabeth Symonds, whom he described in his will as his "much deserving friend." By her, he had an illegitimate son, Charles Bovey (1676–1713). In an unusual arrangement for the time, Sir Ralph chose to be buried with Elizabeth in the family vault at Longstowe rather than with his wife.

== Library and intellectual interests ==
Bovey was a book collector with substantial libraries at both his London and Longstowe residences. His probate inventory recorded 269 books in his Holborn town house and 176 books at Longstowe, distributed across several closets. The collection included folios, playbooks, and sermons, reflecting diverse intellectual interests.

In his will, he bequeathed his entire library to his son Charles, contingent upon Elizabeth Symonds not remarrying after his death. He also provided for Charles's education at Eton College and Emmanuel College, Cambridge, as well as funding for a grand tour.

== Death and monument ==
Sir Ralph Bovey died on 15 September 1679. In a remarkable example of detailed posthumous planning, his will specified both his burial arrangements and the design of his funerary monument.

The monument, located in St Mary's Church, Longstowe, was commissioned from the sculptor John Bushnell, whom Bovey specifically named in his will, stating: "my will and desire is that Mr Bushnell (if hee be living) whose work I have seen very good in that kinde, may p[e]rforme it."

The monument features a half-figure of Bovey rising from what appears to be the ocean, grasping a wooden anchor lowered from clouds by a divine hand. This iconography represents resurrection and salvation, with the anchor symbolizing Christian hope. The work is executed in white marble set within a niche of black marble, with an urn above and festoons, exactly as specified in Bovey's will.

The monument is considered one of the most remarkable examples of the Carolean fashion for resurrection monuments and provides crucial documentary evidence for the attribution of works to John Bushnell, one of England's most enigmatic late 17th-century sculptors.

== Legacy ==
After Sir Ralph's death, his estates passed to his illegitimate son Charles, who married Margaret Piggot of Bassingbourne, Cambridgeshire, in 1703 at St. Paul's Cathedral. Charles, following his father's profession, was admitted to Lincoln's Inn in 1701.

When Charles died in 1713, the estates were held in trust for his son, Charles junior. However, the younger Charles died in 1728 before reaching majority, leaving the inheritance to pass to the Reverend Thomas Davies, Sir Ralph Bovey's great-nephew, on condition that he adopt the surname Bovey.

Honorary titles
Preceded by Sir Henry Massingberd	High Sheriff of Bedfordshire; 1668	Succeeded by ? De Lawney
Preceded by Sir Thomas Brounsell	High Sheriff of Bedfordshire; 1669–1670	Succeeded by Richard Wagstaffe
Baronetage of England
New creation	Baronet (of Longstowe); 1660–1679	Extinct
