= Bourgoin (surname) =

Bourgoin (pronounced [buʁɡwɛ̃]) is a French surname. Like the related Bourgoing, Bourgoyne and Bourguignon it is a name denoting a person from Burgundy (French: Bourgogne) and therefore of toponymic origin. Notable people with this name include:

- Edmé Bourgoin (1836–1897), French physician and politician
- Gérard Bourgoin (1939–2025), French businessman, sports chairman and politician
- Jean Bourgoin (1913–1991), French cinematographer
- Louise Bourgoin (born 1981), French actress, model and television presenter
- Stéphane Bourgoin (born 1953), French writer
