= Christopher Smith (MP, died 1589) =

16th-century English politician

Christopher Smith (by 1510 – 1589) was an English politician.

The son of Robert Smith of Waltham, Lincolnshire, he was elected member (MP) of the Parliament of England for Saltash in 1547, Bridport in October 1553, St. Albans in 1559.

He was appointed clerk of the Exchequer by 1545 and Clerk of the Pipe by 1551, a position he held until his death. He was a justice of the peace for Hertfordshire from 1562 to his death. His home, Annables Manor, was in Harpenden.

== Family ==
Smith married Margaret, the daughter of John Hyde of Aldbury, Hertfordshire. Hyde had also been Clerk of the Pipe from the 1520s until his death in 1545. Their children included:

- Thomas Smith of Annables, who married Joan Collet
- Nicholas Smith
- Jane Smith, who married George Rotheram of Someries, near Luton, a Member of Parliament.
- Maudlin Smith, who married Edmund Anderson.
- Alice Smith, married (1) Richard Robson of London, (2) John Fortescue of Salden, Chancellor of the Exchequer.
- Elizabeth Smith, who married a man named Ralegh.
