= James Francis Hatfield Harter =

English landowner and administrator (1854-1910)

- Born: 1854
- Died: 1910 (aged 55–56)
- Occupation: Administrator

James Francis Hatfield Harter (1854 - 20 October 1910) was an English landowner and administrator.

== Biography ==
Harter owned Cranfield Court in Bedfordshire. He was educated at Eton School and Magdalene College, Cambridge.

Harter served as justice of the peace for Bedfordshire and Buckinghamshire, and was High Sheriff of Bedfordshire in 1885. He was a member of the first Bedfordshire County Council on its establishment in April 1889, and twice President of the Bedfordshire Agricultural Society.

In the 1890s and 1900s, Harter was a major shareholder in British railway development.

Harter was an army officer in the Royal Buckinghamshire Hussars, a Yeomanry regiment, where he was appointed major on 17 June 1896. He was lieutenant-colonel in command of the regiment from 30 January 1900 until he resigned on 20 September 1902, when he was granted the honorary rank of colonel.

He died at Cranfield Court on 20 October 1910. After his death in 1910, Cranfield Village Hall was built in his memory the following year, and opened in 1912.

== Family ==
Harter married in 1887 Violet Loftus, daughter of Captain Douglas Loftus, Grenadier Guards. They had a daughter Violet Harter, who married Esmé Arkwright.
