= François Bourgoing (singer) =

François Bourgoing (15..–16..) was a member of the Oratory of Jesus, author of two books on the plain song in use in his order, and active in the first half of the 17th century. He must not be mistaken for François Bourgoing (priest) (1585-1662), third superior general of this order.

== Biography ==
His life remains rather obscure; he was born in Bourges and we know that he entered the Paris Oratory on 26 November 1616. The second Assembly of the Order charged him with the task of improving the singing of the Oratorians and publishing a collection along these lines (this would be the Brevis psalmodiæ ratio of 1634), which suggests that he was a singer of his church (in 1634 he is said to be a priest and a chori moderatore). This evolution of the chant had been desired by Cardinal Pierre de Bérulle, and bore fruit since the house on rue Saint-Honoré, which was quite frequented by the court, became famous for the quality of the chant heard there.

On 12 August 1636, François Bourgoing was transferred to the house of La Rochelle. On 5 October 1639, already excluded several times for misconduct and just recovered from an illness, he promised to amend his conduct against a pension paid by the Order. Shortly afterwards, while he became chaplain to the nuns of Picpus, his pension was reduced to the strict necessities (29 November 1640). The end of his ecclesiastical career is not known.

== Works ==
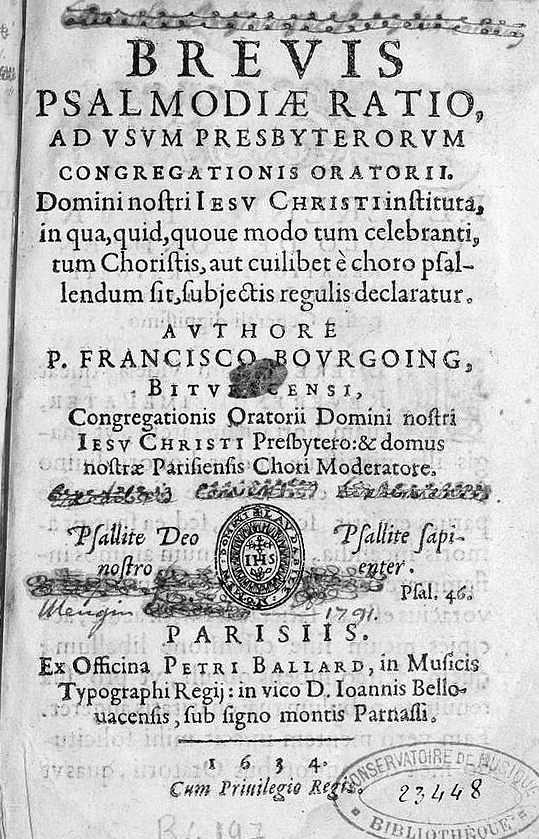
Title page of the Brevis psalmodiae ratio (Paris, 1634). (Paris BNF)

- Brevis psalmodiæ ratio, ad usum presbyterorum Congregationis Oratorii... authore P. Francisco Bourgoing. Paris: Pierre I Ballard, 1634. 8°. Read on Gallica. Guillo 2003 n° 1634-B, Mariolle 1997 n° 3, RISM B-VI p. 173.

Plain song Method for the Oratory Congregation, reissued in 1753. It contains songs that are not all from Bourgoing. The author defines accents, punctuation and alteration. Dedication to Charles de Condren, second superior general of the Oratorians.

- Le David françois, ou traité de la saincte psalmodie, contenant plusieurs advis ou enseignemens méthodiques pour ceux qui sont appliquez par estat à chanter les louanges de Dieu, avec un petit traité touchant la saincte messe. Paris: Sébastien Huré, 1641. 8°. Mariolle 1997 n° 4, RISM B-VI p. 173. Paris BNF, Bordeaux BM.
- Le David françois, ou traité chronologique contenant plusieurs remarques sur les sacerdoces des lois de nature, de Moïse, et de grâce... Seconde partie. Paris: Louis Boulanger, 1641. 8°. Paris BSG.

Work reprinted (or reissued in 1645). Paris BSG.

- A treatise containing several comments on the secular and political state of the Church; and particularly on the sacred persons of the kings and monarchs, both Old and New Testament, who are the leaders and moderators of the Church, and who can by their piety, zeal and great power greatly help the ecclesiastical state. This discourse can be used as an interview for a young prince, to animate him to virtue and follow in the footsteps of his predecessors.. Paris: Boulanger, 1643.8°. Munich UB.

== Sources ==
- Laurent Guillo, Pierre I Ballard et Robert III Ballard : imprimeurs du roy pour la musique (1599–1673). Liège: Mardaga and Versailles: CMBV, 2003. 2 vol.
- Philippe Vendrix. Pour les grands et les autres : la réforme oratorienne du plain-chant. Plain-chant et liturgie en France au XVIIe siècle, éd. Jean Duron (Paris and Versailles, 1997), (pp. 87-96).
- Bénédicte Mariolle. Bibliographie des ouvrages théoriques traitant du plain-chant (1582-1789). Plain-chant et liturgie en France au XVIIe siècle, ed. Jean Duron (Paris and Versailles, 1997), (pp. 285-356).
- Amédée Gastoué. Un coin de la musique du XVIIe siècle : le chant des Oratoriens, Louis XIII maître de chapelle. Variations sur la musique d’église (Schola Cantorum de Paris, 1912), (pp. 62-72).
- Louis Batterel. Mémoires domestiques pour servir à l'histoire de l'Oratoire., ed. Auguste-Marie-Pierre Ingold. Paris: Picard, 1902. (pp. 148-152).
