= List of chancellors of the Duchy of Lancaster =

Upon its medieval creation The Chancellor of the Duchy was responsible for:

- Managing land revenues and estates
- Overseeing legal proceedings in the Duchy’s courts
- Acting as a liaison between the Duke of Lancaster and the Crown.

The chancellor of the Duchy of Lancaster is, in modern times, a sinecure office in the government of the United Kingdom.

Louise Haigh has been chancellor of the Duchy of Lancaster since 20 July 2026.

== Chancellors of the Duchy of Lancaster (1361–1644) ==
Name (Birth–Death)	Term of office	
Sir Henry de Haydock	1355	1373
Ralph de Ergham; Bishop of Sarum (–1400) (Note: Served as Bishop of Sarum from 1375.)	1373	16 April 1377
Thomas de Thelwall (–1382)	16 April 1377	1378
Sir John De Yerborough	1378	10 November 1382
Sir Thomas Stanley pro temp.	10 November 1382	29 November 1382
Sir Thomas Scarle	29 November 1382	October; 1383
Sir William Okey	October; 1383	1400
John de Wakering	1400	1400
William Burgoyne	1400	15 May 1404
Sir Thomas Stanley	15 May 1404	30 March 1410
John Springthorpe	30 March 1410	4 April 1413
John Wodehouse	4 April 1413	10 June 1424
William Troutbecke	10 June 1424	16 February 1431
Walter Sherington	16 February 1431	3 July 1442
William Tresham; MP for Northamptonshire (1404–1450)	3 July 1442	10 June 1449
John Say; MP for Cambridgeshire (–1478)	10 June 1449	10 June 1462
Sir Richard Fowler; Chancellor of the Exchequer (c. 1425–1477) (Note: Served as Chancellor of the Exchequer from 1469 to c. April 1471.)	10 June 1462	3 November 1477
Sir John Say; MP for Cambridgeshire (–1478)	3 November 1477	2 April 1478
Thomas Thwaites; Chancellor of the Exchequer (c. 1435–1503)	2 April 1478	7 July 1483
Thomas Metcalfe (–c. 1504)	7 July 1483	13 September 1486
Sir Reginald Bray (c. 1440–1503)	13 September 1486	24 June 1503
Sir John Mordaunt (–c. 1505)	24 June 1503	3 October 1505
Sir Richard Empson (c. 1450–1510)	3 October 1505	14 May 1509
Sir Henry Marney (c. 1447–1523)	14 May 1509	14 April 1523
Sir Richard Wingfield (c. 1469–1525)	14 April 1523	31 December 1525
Sir Thomas More (1478–1535)	31 December 1525	3 November 1529
Sir William Fitzwilliam (c. 1490–1542)	3 November 1529	10 May 1533
Sir John Gage (1479–1556)	10 May 1533	1 July 1547
William Paget; 1st Baron Paget; Secretary of State (1506–1563) (Note: Served as Secretary of State until 1548. Created Baron Paget in the peerage of England in 1549.)	1 July 1547	7 July 1552
Sir John Gates; MP for Essex (1504–1553)	7 July 1552	1553
Sir Robert Rochester; MP for Essex (c. 1516–1561)	1553	1557
Sir Edward Waldegrave; MP for Essex (c. 1516–1561)	22 June 1558	1559
Sir Ambrose Cave; MP for Warwickshire (–1568)	1559	16 May 1568
Sir Ralph Sadler; MP for Hertfordshire (1507–1587)	16 May 1568	15 June 1587
Sir Francis Walsingham; Secretary of State (c. 1532–1590)	15 June 1587	1590
Sir Thomas Heneage; MP for Essex (1532–1595)	1590	7 October 1595
Seal in commission	1595	1597
Sir Robert Cecil; Secretary of State; Lord Privy Seal (1563–1612) (Note: Served as Lord Privy Seal from 1598.)	8 October 1597	1599
Seal in commission	1599	16 September 1601
Sir John Fortescue; Chancellor of the Exchequer; MP for Middlesex (c. 1531–1607) (Note: Served as Chancellor of the Exchequer until 1603. MP for Middlesex during 1601 Parliament.)	16 September 1601	23 December 1607
Sir Thomas Parry; MP for Berkshire (1541–1616) (Note: MP for Berkshire during the 1614 Parliament.)	December; 1607	May; 1616
Sir John Dacombe (1570–1618)	27 May 1616	January; 1618
Sir Humphrey May; MP for Leicester (1573–1630) (Note: Elected to Parliament as MP for Lancaster in 1621 and 1625, and as MP for Leicester in 1624 and 1626.)	23 March 1618	16 April 1629
Edward Barrett; 1st Baron Barrett of Newburgh (1581–1645)	16 April 1629	10 February 1644
Francis Seymour; 1st Baron Seymour of Trowbridge (c. 1590–1664) (Note: Royalist appointee during the Oxford Parliament, re-appointed Chancellor in 1660 after the Restoration.)	1644	1645

== Chancellors serving Parliament and the Commonwealth ==
William Grey, 1st Baron Grey of Werke & William Lenthall (commission)	(Lenthall)	10 February 1644	1648
Gilbert Gerard		1648	1 August 1649
John Bradshaw		1 August 1649	1653
John Bradshaw & Thomas Fell (commissioners)	(Bradshaw)	1653	1654
Thomas Fell		1654	1658
John Bradshaw		1658	1659
William Lenthall		1659	1659
Gilbert Gerard		14 May 1659	9 July 1659

== Chancellors of the Duchy of Lancaster (1660–present) ==
=== 17th century ===
Portrait	Name (Birth–Death)	Term of office	
	Francis Seymour; 1st Baron Seymour of Trowbridge (c. 1590–1664)	9 July 1660	21 July 1664
	Sir Thomas Ingram; MP for Thirsk (1614–1672)	21 July 1664	22 February 1672
	Sir Robert Carr; MP for Lincolnshire (c. 1637–1682)	22 February 1672	21 November 1682
	Sir Thomas Chicheley (1614–1699)	21 November 1682	1687
	Robert Phelips (1619–1707)	May; 1687	March; 1689
	Robert Bertie; Baron Willoughby de Eresby (1660–1723)	21 March 1689	4 May 1697
	Thomas Grey; 2nd Earl of Stamford (c. 1654–1720)	4 May 1697	12 May 1702

=== 18th century ===
Portrait	Name (Birth–Death)	Term of office		Party
	John Leveson-Gower; 1st Baron Gower (1675–1709) (Note: MP for Newcastle-under-Lyme until 1703; thereafter elevated to the peerage of England as Baron Gower.)	12 May 1702	10 June 1706	Tory
	James Stanley; 10th Earl of Derby (1664–1736)	10 June 1706	21 September 1710	—
	William Berkeley; 4th Baron Berkeley of Stratton (c. 1692–1741)	21 September 1710	6 November 1714	—
	Heneage Finch; 1st Earl of Aylesford (c. 1649–1719)	6 November 1714	12 March 1716	Tory
	Richard Lumley; 1st Earl of Scarbrough (1650–1721)	12 March 1716	19 June 1717	—
	Nicholas Lechmere; 1st Baron Lechmere (1675–1727) (Note: MP for Tewkesbury until 1721; thereafter elevated to the peerage of Great Britain as Baron Lechmere.)	19 June 1717	17 July 1727	—
	John Manners; 3rd Duke of Rutland (1696–1779)	17 July 1727	21 May 1735	Whig
	George Cholmondeley; 3rd Earl of Cholmondeley (1703–1770)	21 May 1735	22 December 1742	Whig
	Richard Edgcumbe; 1st Baron Edgcumbe (1680–1758)	22 December 1742	5 December 1758	—
	Thomas Hay; 9th Earl of Kinnoull (1710–1787)	27 February 1759	13 December 1762	Whig
	James Smith-Stanley; MP for Lancashire (1716–1771) (Note: Commonly styled with the courtesy title Lord Strange, however neither James Smith-Stanley or his father has any right to it.)	13 December 1762	14 June 1771	—
	Thomas Villiers; 1st Earl of Clarendon (1709–1786) (Note: Baron Hyde since 1756; elevated in the peerage of Great Britain as Earl of Clarendon from 1776.)	14 June 1771	17 April 1782	Whig
	John Dunning; 1st Baron Ashburton (1731–1783)	17 April 1782	29 August 1783	Whig
	Edward Smith-Stanley; 12th Earl of Derby (1752–1834)	29 August 1783	31 December 1783	Whig
	Thomas Villiers; 1st Earl of Clarendon (1709–1786)	31 December 1783	6 September 1786	Whig
	Charles Jenkinson; 1st Earl of Liverpool (1752–1834) (Note: Baron Hawkesbury since August 1786; elevated in the peerage of Great Britain as Earl of Liverpool from May 1796.)	6 September 1786	11 November 1803	—

=== 19th–21st centuries ===
Minister in the House of Commons	Minister in the House of Lords

Portrait	Name (Birth–Death)	Term of office		Concurrent office(s)	Party	Prime Minister
	Thomas Pelham; Baron Pelham (1756–1826)	11 November 1803	6 June 1804	—	Whig	Henry Addington
	Henry Phipps; 3rd Baron Mulgrave (1744–1792)	6 June 1804	14 January 1805	—	Tory	William Pitt the Younger
	Robert Hobart; 4th Earl of Buckinghamshire (1760–1816)	14 January 1805	10 July 1805	—	Tory	William Pitt the Younger
	Dudley Ryder; 2nd Baron Harrowby (1762–1847)	10 July 1805	12 February 1806	—	Tory	William Pitt the Younger
	Edward Smith-Stanley; 12th Earl of Derby (1752–1834)	12 February 1806	30 March 1807	—	Whig	William Grenville (Ministry of All the Talents)
	Spencer Perceval; MP for Northampton (1762–1812)	30 March 1807	11 May 1812	Chancellor of the Exchequer; Leader of the House of Commons	Tory	William Cavendish-Bentinck, 3rd Duke of Portland
	Spencer Perceval; MP for Northampton (1762–1812)	30 March 1807	11 May 1812	Prime Minister; Chancellor of the Exchequer; Leader of the House of Commons (from October 1809)	Tory	Himself
	Robert Hobart; 4th Earl of Buckinghamshire (1760–1816)	23 May 1812	23 June 1812	President of the Board of Control	Tory	Robert Jenkinson, 2nd Earl of Liverpool
	Charles Bathurst; MP for Harwich (1754–1831) (Note: MP for Bodmin until 1818, thereafter MP for Harwich.)	23 June 1812	13 February 1823	President of the Board of Control (January 1821 – February 1822)	—	Robert Jenkinson, 2nd Earl of Liverpool
	Nicholas Vansittart; 1st Baron Bexley (1766–1851)	13 February 1823	26 January 1828		Tory	Robert Jenkinson, 2nd Earl of Liverpool
	Nicholas Vansittart; 1st Baron Bexley (1766–1851)	13 February 1823	26 January 1828		Tory	George Canning (April–August 1827)
	Nicholas Vansittart; 1st Baron Bexley (1766–1851)	13 February 1823	26 January 1828		Tory	F. J. Robinson, 1st Viscount Goderich
	George Hamilton-Gordon; 4th Earl of Aberdeen (1784–1860)	26 January 1828	2 June 1828	—	Tory	Arthur Wellesley, 1st Duke of Wellington
	Charles Arbuthnot; MP for St Ives (1767–1850)	2 June 1828	25 November 1830	—	Tory	Arthur Wellesley, 1st Duke of Wellington
	Henry Vassall-Fox; 3rd Baron Holland (1773–1840)	25 November 1830	14 November 1834		Whig	Charles Grey
	Henry Vassall-Fox; 3rd Baron Holland (1773–1840)	25 November 1830	14 November 1834		Whig	William Lamb, 2nd Viscount Melbourne
	vacant	14 November 1834	26 December 1834			Arthur Wellesley, 1st Duke of Wellington (Caretaker)
	Charles Williams-Wynn; MP for Montgomeryshire (1775–1850)	26 December 1834	8 April 1835	—	Conservative	Robert Peel
	Henry Vassall-Fox; 3rd Baron Holland (1773–1840)	23 April 1835	31 October 1840	—	Whig	William Lamb, 2nd Viscount Melbourne
	George Villiers; 4th Earl of Clarendon (1800–1870)	31 October 1840	23 June 1841	Lord Privy Seal	Whig	William Lamb, 2nd Viscount Melbourne
	Sir George Grey; MP for Devonport (1799–1882)	23 June 1841	30 August 1841	—	Whig	William Lamb, 2nd Viscount Melbourne
	Lord Granville Somerset; MP for Monmouthshire (1792–1848)	3 September 1841	27 June 1846	—	Conservative	Robert Peel
	John Campbell; 1st Baron Campbell (1779–1861)	6 July 1846	6 March 1850	—	Whig	John Russell
	George Howard; 7th Earl of Carlisle (1802–1864)	6 March 1850	21 February 1852	First Commissioner of Woods and Forests (until July 1850)	Whig	John Russell
	Robert Christopher; MP for North Lincolnshire (1804–1887)	1 March 1852	17 December 1852	—	Conservative	Edward Smith-Stanley, 14th Earl of Derby
	Edward Strutt; MP for Nottingham (1801–1880)	3 January 1853	21 June 1854	—	Whig / Radical	George Hamilton-Gordon, 4th Earl of Aberdeen (Coalition)
	Granville Leveson-Gower; 2nd Earl Granville (1815–1891)	21 June 1854	30 January 1855	—	Whig	George Hamilton-Gordon, 4th Earl of Aberdeen (Coalition)
	vacant	February; 1855	March; 1855			George Hamilton-Gordon, 4th Earl of Aberdeen (Coalition)
	Dudley Ryder; 2nd Earl of Harrowby (1798–1882)	31 March 1855	7 December 1855	—	—	Henry John Temple, 3rd Viscount Palmerston
	Matthew Talbot Baines; MP for Leeds (1799–1860)	7 December 1855	21 February 1858	—	Whig	Henry John Temple, 3rd Viscount Palmerston
	James Graham; 4th Duke of Montrose (1799–1874)	26 February 1858	11 June 1859	—	Conservative	Edward Smith-Stanley, 14th Earl of Derby
	Sir George Grey; MP for Morpeth (1799–1882)	22 June 1859	25 July 1861	—	Whig / Liberal	Henry John Temple, 3rd Viscount Palmerston
	Edward Cardwell; MP for Oxford (1813–1886)	25 July 1861	7 April 1864	—	Liberal	Henry John Temple, 3rd Viscount Palmerston
	George Villiers; 4th Earl of Clarendon (1800–1870)	7 April 1864	3 November 1865	—	Liberal	Henry John Temple, 3rd Viscount Palmerston
	vacant	3 November 1865	26 January 1866			John Russell
	George Goschen; MP for City of London (1831–1907)	26 January 1866	26 June 1866	Vice-President of the Board of Trade (until March 1866)	Liberal	John Russell
	William Courtenay; 11th Earl of Devon (1807–1888)	10 July 1866	26 June 1867	President of the Poor Law Board (from May 1867)	Conservative	Edward Smith-Stanley, 14th Earl of Derby
	John Wilson-Patten; MP for North Lancashire (1802–1892)	26 June 1867	7 November 1868	—	Conservative	Edward Smith-Stanley, 14th Earl of Derby
	John Wilson-Patten; MP for North Lancashire (1802–1892)	26 June 1867	7 November 1868	Chief Secretary for Ireland (from September 1868)	Conservative	Benjamin Disraeli (from February 1868)
	Thomas Edward Taylor; MP for County Dublin (1811–1883)	7 November 1868	1 December 1868	—	Conservative	Benjamin Disraeli (from February 1868)
	Frederick Hamilton-Temple-Blackwood; 1st Earl of Dufferin (1826–1902) (Note: Baron Dufferin and Claneboye since 1841. Elevated in the peerage of the United Kingdom as Earl of Dufferin in 1871.)	12 December 1868	9 August 1872	Paymaster General	Liberal	William Ewart Gladstone
	Hugh Childers; MP for Pontefract (1827–1896)	9 August 1872	30 September 1873	Paymaster General	Liberal	William Ewart Gladstone
	John Bright; MP for Birmingham (1811–1889)	30 September 1873	17 February 1874	—	Liberal	William Ewart Gladstone
	Thomas Edward Taylor; MP for County Dublin (1811–1883)	2 March 1874	21 April 1880	—	Conservative	Benjamin Disraeli (Earl of Beaconsfield from 1876)
	John Bright; MP for Birmingham (1811–1889)	28 April 1880	25 July 1882	—	Liberal	William Ewart Gladstone
	John Wodehouse; 1st Earl of Kimberley (1826–1902)	25 July 1882	28 December 1882	Colonial Secretary	Liberal	William Ewart Gladstone
	John George Dodson; MP for Scarborough (1825–1897)	28 December 1882	29 October 1884	—	Liberal	William Ewart Gladstone
	George Trevelyan; MP for Hawick Burghs (1838–1928)	29 October 1884	9 June 1885	—	Liberal	William Ewart Gladstone
	Henry Chaplin; MP for Sleaford (1840–1923)	24 June 1885	28 January 1886	—	Conservative	Robert Gascoyne-Cecil, 3rd Marquess of Salisbury
	Edward Heneage; MP for Great Grimsby (1840–1922)	6 February 1886	16 April 1886	—	Liberal	William Ewart Gladstone
	Sir Ughtred Kay-Shuttleworth; MP for Clitheroe (1844–1939)	16 April 1886	20 July 1886	—	Liberal	William Ewart Gladstone
	Gathorne Gathorne-Hardy; 1st Viscount Cranbrook (1814–1906)	3 August 1886	16 August 1886	Lord President of the Council	Conservative	Robert Gascoyne-Cecil, 3rd Marquess of Salisbury
	John Manners; 7th Duke of Rutland (1818–1906) (Note: MP for Melton until 1888, thereafter succeeded his brother as Duke of Rutland.)	16 August 1886	11 August 1892	—	Conservative	Robert Gascoyne-Cecil, 3rd Marquess of Salisbury
	James Bryce; MP for Aberdeen South (1838–1922)	18 August 1892	28 May 1894		Liberal	William Ewart Gladstone (until March 1894)
	James Bryce; MP for Aberdeen South (1838–1922)	18 August 1892	28 May 1894		Liberal	Archibald Primrose, 5th Earl of Rosebery
	Edward Marjoribanks; 2nd Baron Tweedmouth (1849–1909)	28 May 1894	21 June 1895	Lord Privy Seal	Liberal	Archibald Primrose, 5th Earl of Rosebery
	R. A. Cross; 1st Viscount Cross (1823–1914)	29 June 1895	4 July 1895	Lord Privy Seal	Conservative	Robert Gascoyne-Cecil, 3rd Marquess of Salisbury
	Henry James; 1st Baron James of Hereford (1828–1911)	4 July 1895	11 August 1902		Liberal Unionist	Robert Gascoyne-Cecil, 3rd Marquess of Salisbury
	Henry James; 1st Baron James of Hereford (1828–1911)	4 July 1895	11 August 1902		Liberal Unionist	Arthur Balfour (from 12 July 1902)
	Sir William Hood Walrond; Bt; MP for Tiverton (1849–1925)	11 August 1902	4 December 1905	—	Conservative	Arthur Balfour; Coalition
	Sir Henry Fowler; MP for Wolverhampton East (1830–1911)	10 December 1905	13 October 1908		Liberal	Henry Campbell-Bannerman
	Sir Henry Fowler; MP for Wolverhampton East (1830–1911)	10 December 1905	13 October 1908		Liberal	H. H. Asquith
	Edmond Fitzmaurice; 1st Baron Fitzmaurice (1846–1935)	13 October 1908	25 June 1909	—	Liberal	H. H. Asquith
	Herbert Samuel; MP for Cleveland (1870–1963)	25 June 1909	14 February 1910	—	Liberal	H. H. Asquith
	Jack Pease; MP for Rotherham (1860–1943)	14 February 1910	23 October 1911	—	Liberal	H. H. Asquith
	Charles Hobhouse; MP for Bristol East (1862–1941)	23 October 1911	11 February 1914	—	Liberal	H. H. Asquith
	Charles Masterman (1873–1927) (Note: On appointment to office a ministerial by-election was triggered in the Bethnal Green South West constituency that Masterman had represented since 1911. Masterman unsuccessfully contested the seat, narrowly losing to the Conservative candidate. Masterman then unsuccessful stood in the 1914 Ipswich by-election. Masterman resigned as Chancellor of the Duchy of Lancaster after failing to be returned to Parliament.)	11 February 1914	3 February 1915	—	Liberal	H. H. Asquith
	Edwin Samuel Montagu; MP for Chesterton (1879–1924)	3 February 1915	25 May 1915	—	Liberal	H. H. Asquith
	Winston Churchill; MP for Dundee (1874–1965)	25 May 1915	25 November 1915	—	Liberal	H. H. Asquith (War coalition)
	Herbert Samuel; MP for Cleveland (1870–1963)	25 November 1915	11 January 1916	Postmaster-General	Liberal	H. H. Asquith (War coalition)
	Edwin Samuel Montagu; MP for Chesterton (1879–1924)	11 January 1916	9 July 1916	—	Liberal	H. H. Asquith (War coalition)
	Thomas McKinnon Wood; MP for Glasgow St Rollox (1855–1927)	9 July 1916	10 December 1916	Financial Secretary to the Treasury	Liberal	H. H. Asquith (War coalition)
	Frederick Cawley; MP for Prestwich (1850–1937)	10 December 1916	10 February 1918	—	Liberal	David Lloyd George (Coalition)
	Max Aitken; 1st Baron Beaverbrook (1879–1964)	10 February 1918	4 November 1918	Minister of Information	Unionist	David Lloyd George (Coalition)
	William Hayes Fisher; 1st Baron Downham (1853–1920)	4 November 1918	10 January 1919	Minister of Information	Conservative	David Lloyd George (Coalition)
	David Lindsay; 27th Earl of Crawford (1871–1940)	10 January 1919	1 April 1921	—	Conservative	David Lloyd George (Coalition)
	William Peel; 2nd Viscount Peel (1867–1937)	1 April 1921	7 April 1922	Minister of Transport	Conservative	David Lloyd George (Coalition)
	Sir William Sutherland; MP for Argyllshire (1880–1949)	7 April 1922	9 October 1922	—	Liberal	David Lloyd George (Coalition)
	James Gascoyne-Cecil; 4th Marquess of Salisbury (1861–1947)	24 October 1922	25 May 1923	Lord President of the Council	Conservative	Bonar Law
	J. C. C. Davidson; MP for Hemel Hempstead (1889–1970)	25 May 1923	22 January 1924	—	Conservative	Stanley Baldwin
	Josiah Wedgwood; MP for Newcastle-under-Lyme (1872–1943)	22 January 1924	3 November 1924	—	Labour	Ramsay MacDonald
	Robert Cecil; 1st Viscount Cecil of Chelwood (1864–1958)	10 November 1924	19 October 1927	—	Conservative	Stanley Baldwin
	Ronald McNeill; 1st Baron Cushendun (1861–1934)	19 October 1927	4 June 1929	—	Conservative	Stanley Baldwin
	Sir Oswald Mosley; Bt; MP for Smethwick (1896–1980)	7 June 1929	19 May 1930	responsibility for unemployment	Labour	Ramsay MacDonald
	Clement Attlee; MP for Limehouse (1883–1967)	23 May 1930	13 March 1931	—	Labour	Ramsay MacDonald
	Arthur Ponsonby; 1st Baron Ponsonby of Shulbrede (1871–1946)	13 March 1931	24 August 1931	—	Labour	Ramsay MacDonald
	Philip Kerr; 11th Marquess of Lothian (1882–1940)	25 August 1931	10 November 1931	—	Liberal	Ramsay MacDonald (1st Nat. coalition)
	Sir John Davidson; MP for Hemel Hempstead (1889–1970)	10 November 1931	28 May 1937	sometime chairman of the Indian States inquiry	Conservative	Ramsay MacDonald (2nd Nat. coalition)
	Sir John Davidson; MP for Hemel Hempstead (1889–1970)	10 November 1931	28 May 1937	sometime chairman of the Indian States inquiry	Conservative	Stanley Baldwin (3rd Nat. coalition)
	Edward Turnour; 6th Earl Winterton (1883–1962)	28 May 1937	29 January 1939	Air Ministry spokesperson in the Commons (March – May 1938)	Conservative	Neville Chamberlain (4th Nat. coalition)
	William Morrison; MP for Cirencester and Tewkesbury (1893–1961)	29 January 1939	3 April 1940	—	Conservative	Neville Chamberlain (4th Nat. coalition)
	William Morrison; MP for Cirencester and Tewkesbury (1893–1961)	29 January 1939	3 April 1940	Minister of Food (from 4 September 1939)	Conservative	Neville Chamberlain (War coalition)
	George Tryon; 1st Baron Tryon (1871–1940)	3 April 1940	14 May 1940	—	Conservative	Neville Chamberlain (War coalition)
	Maurice Hankey; 1st Baron Hankey (1877–1963)	14 May 1940	20 July 1941	—	National	Winston Churchill (War coalition)
	Duff Cooper; MP for Westminster St George's (1890–1954)	20 July 1941	11 November 1943	—	Conservative	Winston Churchill (War coalition)
	Ernest Brown; MP for Leith (1881–1962)	11 November 1943	25 May 1945	—	National Liberal	Winston Churchill (War coalition)
	Arthur Salter; MP for Oxford University (1881–1975)	25 May 1945	26 July 1945	—	Conservative	Winston Churchill (Caretaker coalition)
	John Hynd; MP for Sheffield Attercliffe (1902–1971)	4 August 1945	17 April 1947	Minister for Germany and Austria	Labour	Clement Attlee
	Frank Pakenham; 1st Baron Pakenham (1905–2001)	17 April 1947	31 May 1948	deputy Foreign Secretary (responsibility for the British zone, Germany)	Labour	Clement Attlee
	Hugh Dalton; MP for Bishop Auckland (1887–1962)	31 May 1948	28 February 1950	—	Labour	Clement Attlee
	A. V. Alexander; 1st Viscount Alexander of Hillsborough (1885–1965)	28 February 1950	26 October 1951	—	Labour Co-operative	Clement Attlee
	Philip Cunliffe-Lister; 1st Viscount Swinton (1884–1972)	31 October 1951	24 November 1952	Minister of Materials	Conservative	Winston Churchill
	Frederick Marquis; 1st Viscount Woolton (1883–1965) (Note: Baron Woolton since 1952, created Viscount Woolton in 1953.)	24 November 1952	20 December 1955	Minister of Materials (1 September 1953 – August 1954)	Conservative	Winston Churchill
	Frederick Marquis; 1st Viscount Woolton (1883–1965)	24 November 1952	20 December 1955		Conservative	Anthony Eden
	George Douglas-Hamilton; 10th Earl of Selkirk (1906–1994)	20 December 1955	13 January 1957	—	Conservative	Anthony Eden
	Charles Hill; MP for Luton (1904–1989)	13 January 1957	9 October 1961	—	Conservative	Harold Macmillan
	Iain Macleod; MP for Enfield West (1913–1970)	9 October 1961	20 October 1963	Leader of the House of Commons	Conservative	Harold Macmillan
	John Hare; 1st Viscount Blakenham (1911–1982)	20 October 1963	16 October 1964	Deputy Leader of the House of Lords; Chairman of the Conservative Party	Conservative	Alec Douglas-Home
	Douglas Houghton; MP for Sowerby (1898–1996)	18 October 1964	6 April 1966	special responsibility for Social Services	Labour	Harold Wilson
	George Thomson; MP for Dundee East (1921–2008)	6 April 1966	7 January 1967	—	Labour	Harold Wilson
	Frederick Lee; MP for Newton (1898–1996)	7 January 1967	6 October 1969	—	Labour	Harold Wilson
	George Thomson; MP for Dundee East (1921–2008)	6 October 1969	20 June 1970	—	Labour	Harold Wilson
	Anthony Barber; MP for Altrincham and Sale (1920–2005)	20 June 1970	25 July 1970	responsibility for UK–EEC relations (chiefly, until 1973, negotiating entry)	Conservative	Edward Heath
	Geoffrey Rippon; MP for Hexham (1924–1997)	28 July 1970	5 November 1972	responsibility for UK–EEC relations (chiefly, until 1973, negotiating entry)	Conservative	Edward Heath
	John Davies; MP for Knutsford (1916–1979)	5 November 1972	4 March 1974	responsibility for UK–EEC relations (chiefly, until 1973, negotiating entry)	Conservative	Edward Heath
	Harold Lever; MP for Manchester Central (1914–1995)	5 March 1974	4 May 1979		Labour	Harold Wilson
	Harold Lever; MP for Manchester Central (1914–1995)	5 March 1974	4 May 1979		Labour	James Callaghan
	Norman St John-Stevas; MP for Cambridgeshire (1929–2012)	5 May 1979	5 January 1981	Leader of the House of Commons; Minister for the Arts	Conservative	Margaret Thatcher
	Francis Pym; MP for Cambridgeshire (1922–2008)	5 January 1981	14 September 1981	Leader of the House of Commons; Paymaster General	Conservative	Margaret Thatcher
	Janet Young; Baroness Young (1926–2002)	14 September 1981	6 April 1982	Leader of the House of Lords	Conservative	Margaret Thatcher
	Cecil Parkinson; MP for South Hertfordshire (1931–2016)	6 April 1982	11 June 1983	Paymaster-General	Conservative	Margaret Thatcher
	Arthur Cockfield; Baron Cockfield (1916–2007)	11 June 1983	11 September 1984	—	Conservative	Margaret Thatcher
	Grey Ruthven; 2nd Earl of Gowrie (1939–2021)	11 September 1984	3 September 1985	Minister for the Arts	Conservative	Margaret Thatcher
	Norman Tebbit; MP for Chingford (1931–2025)	3 September 1985	13 June 1987	Chairman of the Conservative Party	Conservative	Margaret Thatcher
	Kenneth Clarke; MP for Rushcliffe (1940–)	13 June 1987	25 July 1988	Minister for Inner Cities (DTI)	Conservative	Margaret Thatcher
	Tony Newton; MP for Braintree (1937–2012)	25 July 1988	24 July 1989	Minister of State at DTI	Conservative	Margaret Thatcher
	Kenneth Baker; MP for Mole Valley (1934–)	24 July 1989	28 November 1990	Chairman of the Conservative Party	Conservative	Margaret Thatcher
	Chris Patten; MP for Bath (1944–)	28 November 1990	10 April 1992	Chairman of the Conservative Party	Conservative	Margaret Thatcher
	William Waldegrave; MP for Bristol West (1946–)	10 April 1992	20 July 1994	responsibility for public services and science	Conservative	John Major
	David Hunt; MP for Wirral West (1942–)	20 July 1994	5 July 1995	Minister for Public Services	Conservative	John Major
	Roger Freeman; MP for Kettering (1942–2025)	5 July 1995	2 May 1997	Minister for Public Services	Conservative	John Major
	David Clark; MP for South Shields (1939–)	2 May 1997	27 July 1998	Minister for the Cabinet Office	Labour	Tony Blair
	Jack Cunningham; MP for Copeland (1939–)	27 July 1998	11 October 1999	Minister for the Cabinet Office	Labour	Tony Blair
	Mo Mowlam; MP for Redcar (1949–2005)	11 October 1999	11 June 2001	Minister for the Cabinet Office	Labour	Tony Blair
	Gus Macdonald; Baron Macdonald of Tradeston (1940–)	11 June 2001	13 June 2003	Minister for the Cabinet Office	Labour	Tony Blair
	Douglas Alexander; MP for Paisley South (1967–)	13 June 2003	8 September 2004	Minister for the Cabinet Office	Labour	Tony Blair
	Alan Milburn; MP for Darlington (1958–)	8 September 2004	6 May 2005	Minister for the Cabinet Office	Labour	Tony Blair
	John Hutton; MP for Barrow and Furness (1955–)	6 May 2005	2 November 2005	Minister for the Cabinet Office	Labour	Tony Blair
	Jim Murphy; MP for East Renfrewshire (1967–) (acting)	2 November 2005	5 May 2006	Parliamentary Secretary for the Cabinet Office	Labour	Tony Blair
	Hilary Armstrong; MP for North West Durham (1945–)	5 May 2006	28 June 2007	Minister for the Cabinet Office; Minister for Social Exclusion	Labour	Tony Blair
	Ed Miliband; MP for Doncaster North (1969–)	28 June 2007	3 October 2008	Minister for the Cabinet Office	Labour	Gordon Brown
	Liam Byrne; MP for Birmingham Hodge Hill (1970–)	3 October 2008	5 June 2009	Minister for the Cabinet Office	Labour	Gordon Brown
	Janet Royall; Baroness Royall of Blaisdon (1955–)	5 June 2009	11 May 2010	Leader of the House of Lords	Labour	Gordon Brown
	Thomas Galbraith; 2nd Baron Strathclyde (1960–)	12 May 2010	7 January 2013	Leader of the House of Lords	Conservative	David Cameron (Coalition)
	Jonathan Hill; Baron Hill of Oareford (1960–)	7 January 2013	14 July 2014	Leader of the House of Lords	Conservative	David Cameron (Coalition)
	Oliver Letwin; MP for West Dorset (1956–)	14 July 2014	14 July 2016	Minister of State for Government Policy	Conservative	David Cameron (Coalition)
	Oliver Letwin; MP for West Dorset (1956–)	14 July 2014	14 July 2016	in charge of the Cabinet Office	Conservative	David Cameron (II)
	Sir Patrick McLoughlin; MP for Derbyshire Dales (1957–)	14 July 2016	8 January 2018	Chairman of the Conservative Party	Conservative	Theresa May (I)
	Sir Patrick McLoughlin; MP for Derbyshire Dales (1957–)	14 July 2016	8 January 2018	Chairman of the Conservative Party	Conservative	Theresa May (II)
	David Lidington; MP for Aylesbury (1956–)	8 January 2018	24 July 2019	Minister for the Cabinet Office	Conservative	Theresa May (II)
	Michael Gove; MP for Surrey Heath (1967–)	24 July 2019	15 September 2021		Conservative	Boris Johnson (I)
	Michael Gove; MP for Surrey Heath (1967–)	24 July 2019	15 September 2021		Conservative	Boris Johnson (II)
	Michael Gove; MP for Surrey Heath (1967–)	24 July 2019	15 September 2021	Minister for the Cabinet Office (13 February 2020 – 16 September 2021)	Conservative	Boris Johnson (II)
	Steve Barclay; MP for North East Cambridgeshire (1972–)	16 September 2021	5 July 2022	Minister for the Cabinet Office (16 September 2021 – 8 February 2022); Downing Street Chief of Staff (8 February 2022 – 5 July 2022)	Conservative	Boris Johnson (II)
	Kit Malthouse; MP for North West Hampshire (1966–)	7 July 2022	6 September 2022		Conservative	Boris Johnson (II)
	Nadhim Zahawi; MP for Stratford on Avon (1967–)	6 September 2022	25 October 2022	Minister for Equalities; Minister for Intergovernmental Relations	Conservative	Liz Truss
	Oliver Dowden; MP for Hertsmere (1978–)	25 October 2022	5 July 2024	Secretary of State in the Cabinet Office (9 February 2023–5 July 2024); Deputy Prime Minister of the United Kingdom (21 April 2023–5 July 2024 )	Conservative	Rishi Sunak
	Pat McFadden; MP for Wolverhampton South East (1965–)	5 July 2024	5 September 2025	Minister for Intergovernmental Relations	Labour	Keir Starmer
	Darren Jones; MP for Bristol North West (1986–)	5 September 2025	20 July 2026	Minister for Intergovernmental Relations; Chief Secretary to the Prime Minister	Labour	Keir Starmer
	Louise Haigh; MP for Sheffield Heeley (1987–)	20 July 2026	Incumbent	First Secretary of State; Minister for the Cabinet Office	Labour	Andy Burnham

== Bibliography ==
- Baines, Edward (1836). The History of the County Palatine and Duchy of Lancaster. Vol. I. London, Paris, and New York: Fisher, Son, & Co.
- "Chancellor of the Duchy of Lancaster". Parliamentary Debates (Hansard).
- Venning, Timothy (2005). Compendium of British Office Holders. Basingstoke: Palgrave Macmillan.
