= Sir John Burgoyne, 1st Baronet =

English politician

Sir John Burgoyne, 1st Baronet (c. 1592–1657) was an English politician who sat in the House of Commons from 1645 to 1648. He supported the Parliamentarian cause in the English Civil War.

Burgoyne was the son of Roger Burgoyne, of Sutton, Bedfordshire, and Wroxall, Warwickshire and his wife Margaret Wendy, daughter of Thomas Wendy, of Haslingfield, Cambridgeshire. He was baptised at Haslingfield on 29 January 1592. He was admitted at Emmanuel College, Cambridge on 16 April 1607 and admitted at the Middle Temple in October 1611. His father, who was twice a High Sheriff acquired the estate of Honily at Sutton in 1625 and built Old Honily Hall. Burgoyne succeeded to the estates on the death of his father in 1636. He was High Sheriff of Bedfordshire in 1640 and was created a baronet of Sutton on 15 July 1641.

In 1645, Burgoyne was elected Member of Parliament for Warwickshire in the Long Parliament. He sat until 1648 when he was excluded under Pride's Purge.

Burgoyne died at the age of 65.

Burgoyne married Jane Kempe, daughter of Julius Kempe, of Spains Hall, Finchingfield, Essex, by whom he had four daughters and three sons. His son Roger succeeded him in the baronetcy.

Parliament of England
Preceded by Lord Compton; Richard Shuckburgh	Member of Parliament for Warwickshire; 1645–1648; With: Thomas Boughton	Succeeded by Not represented in Rump Parliament
Political offices
Preceded by Richard Child	High Sheriff of Bedfordshire; 1640–1641	Succeeded by Sir Thomas Alston
Baronetage of England
New creation	Baronet (of Sutton); 1641–1657	Succeeded by Roger Burgoyne
