= Reginald Bray =

English administrator (c.1440–1503)

Sir Reginald Bray KG KB
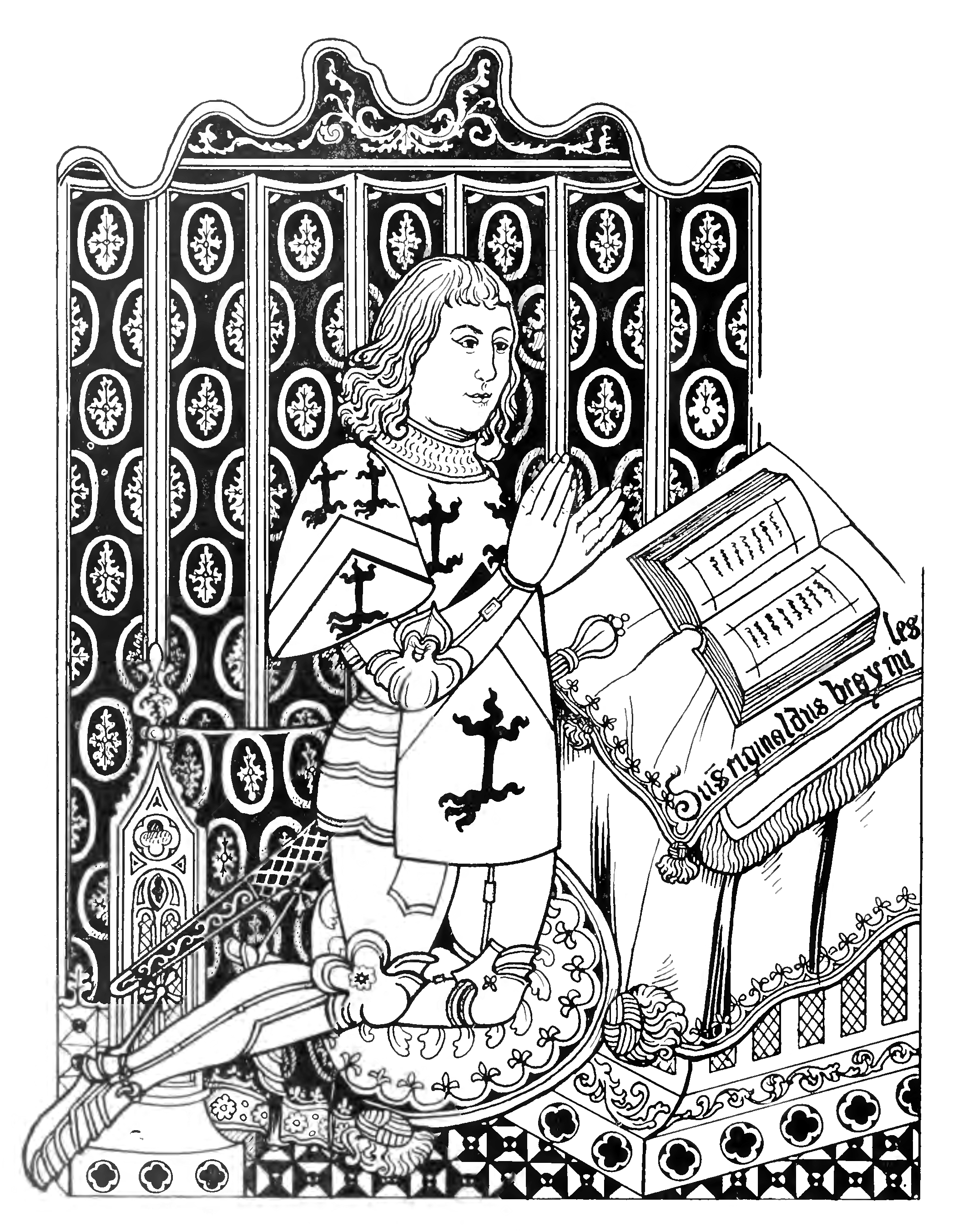
- Sir Reginald Bray, Privy Councillor to Henry VII in the north window of Jesus College, Priory Church, Great Malvern.

Chancellor of the Duchy of Lancaster
- In office 13 September 1486 – 5 August 1503
- Monarch: Henry VII
- Preceded by: Thomas Metcalfe
- Succeeded by: John Mordaunt

Personal details
- Born: c. 1440 St. John Bedwardine, Worcestershire
- Died: 5 August 1503 City of London
- Spouse: Katherine Hussey

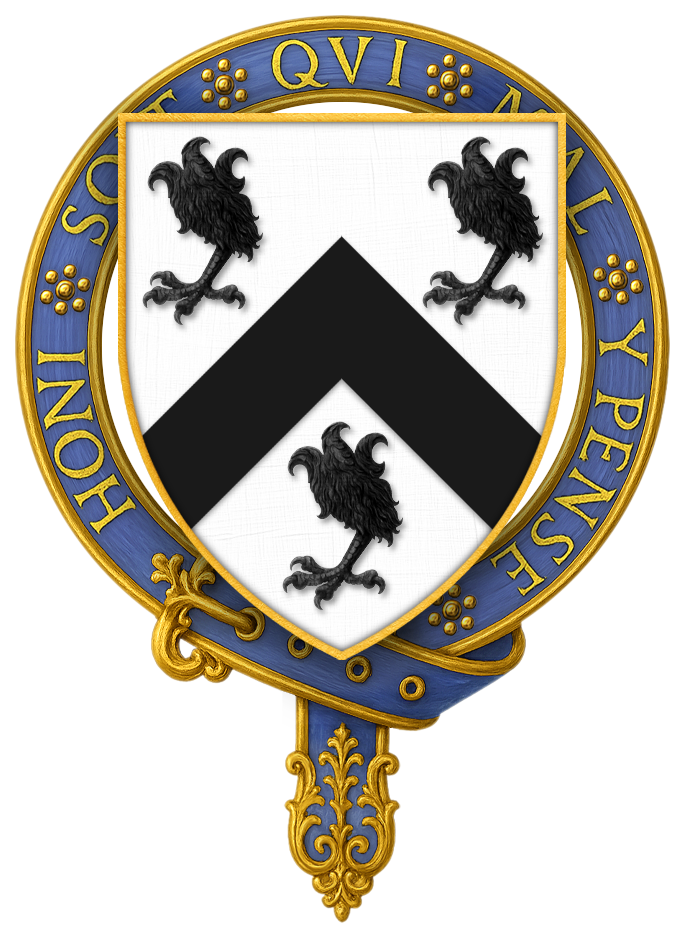
Arms of Sir Reginald Bray, KG: Argent, a chevron between three eagle's legs

Sir Reginald Bray (c. 1440 – 5 August 1503) was an English administrator and statesman. He was the Chancellor of the Duchy and County Palatine of Lancaster under Henry VII, briefly Treasurer of the Exchequer, and one of the most influential men in Henry VII's government and administration. He was an estate officer and senior councillor to both Henry VII and the king's mother, Lady Margaret Beaufort. He was a major benefactor to St George's Chapel, Windsor, where some of the building work for which he provided funds can still be seen and identified.

== Life before 1485 ==
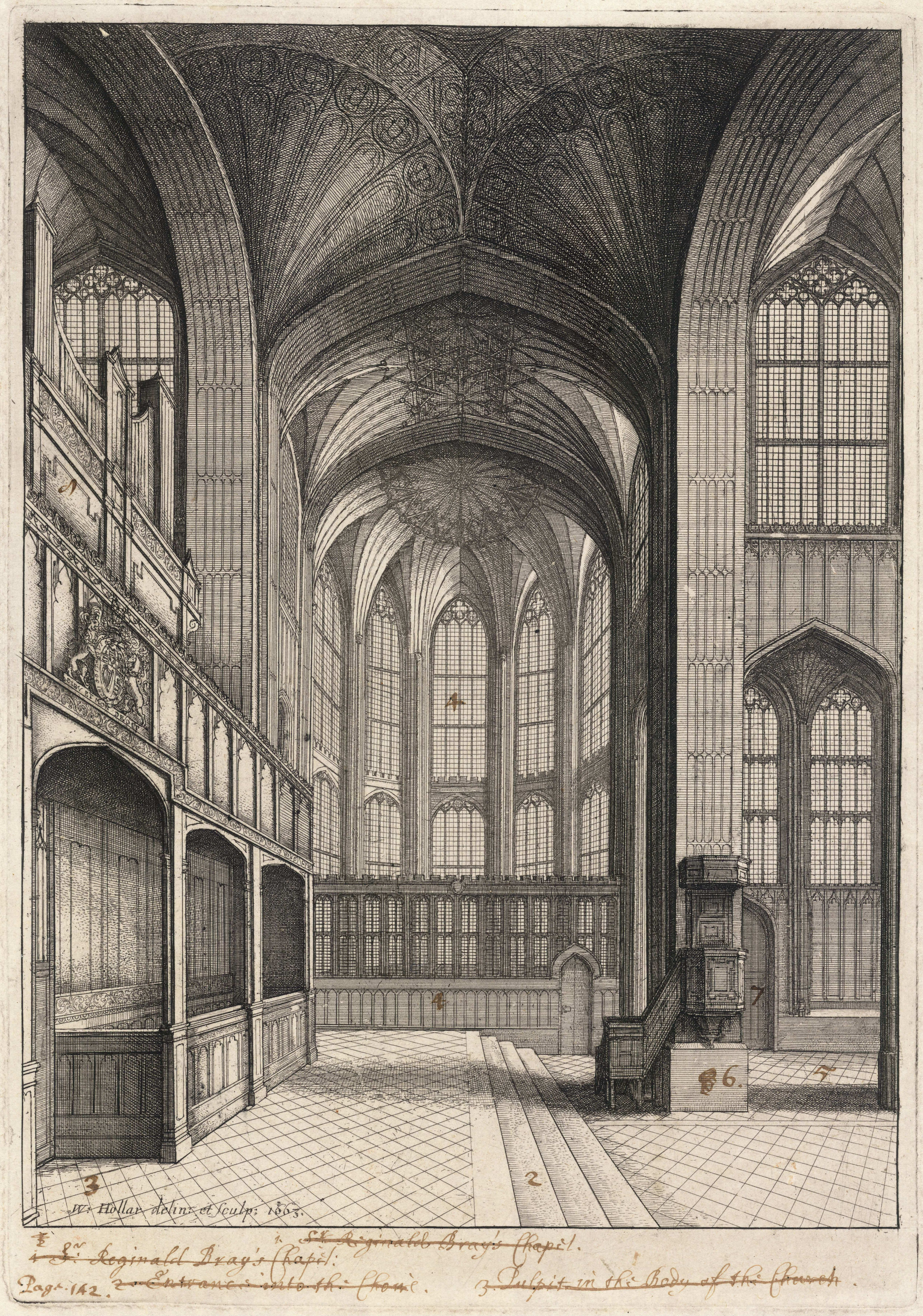
Bray's chapel in St George's Chapel, Windsor Castle

Reginald (Reynold) Bray was born about 1440 in St. John Bedwardine parish, then outside of Worcester, the second son of Richard Bray, a surgeon,. He was the eldest son born of his father's second marriage to Joan Troughton. With his younger brother, John, Bray entered the service of Margaret Beaufort during the period of her marriage to Sir Henry Stafford, acquitting himself sufficiently well to become the couple's receiver-general by 1465. Margaret sent Bray several times on missions to her son by Edmund Tudor. For example, in 1469 he brought the young Henry Tudor a gift of money from his mother to enable the boy to purchase a bow and arrows.

Bray continued in Margaret Beaufort's service after Stafford's death in 1471, and by 1485 had been her estate officer for more than twenty years, serving both Margaret and her successive husbands, Henry Stafford and Thomas, Lord Stanley.

He had a leading role in the various conspiracies of 1483-1485 whose aim was to place Henry Tudor on the English throne. Bray would continue as Margaret Beaufort's receiver-general until his own death in 1503.

== Career 1485-1503 ==
Bray was quickly established at the administrative and financial heart of the new regime. He enjoyed extraordinary and trusted access to the king whom he had first met as a boy. On 13 September 1485, Bray was appointed as Chancellor of the Duchy of Lancaster. He retained the office for life. The office brought immense patronage and responsibilities, both judicial and financial, as well as prestige and profit to its holder. Bray was one of the seven men created a Knight of the Bath at the coronation of Henry VII.

In the autumn and winter of 1485 he was employed doing one of the things he did best, raising money for the king. To this end, he acted jointly with the merchant Avery Cornburgh as under-treasurer of the Exchequer from mid-October 1485; and, on 28 February 1486, he replaced Archbishop Thomas Rotherham as Treasurer, serving until July 1486. He retained some fiscal responsibility until his own death in 1503. He was Treasurer of War for the king's invasion of France in 1492. Peace with France brought him personal profit in the form of a pension from the King of France.

In 1494, he was elected Steward of the University of Oxford, a position which carried judicial responsibilities. He was elevated to be a knight banneret after the battle of Blackheath in 1497. In 1501, he was elected as a Knight of the Garter. He was M.P. for Newcastle-under-Lyme in 1478, and for Hampshire in 1491, 1495, and 1497.

Neither Bray's office of Chancellor of the Duchy, nor the various receiverships, stewardships, custodianship of castles, and the like, to which he was appointed by the king, fully explain his influence. He was above all the king's councillor, one of many, but one of the most important. Under the king, from c. 1499 he led the development of the Council Learned, which met in the Duchy chamber at Westminster. His methods prefigured those of the notorious Empson and Dudley, although his authority and responsibilities were greater than both. As such, modern historiography casts him as one of Henry VII's 'new men'. The nineteenth century compared him to a Prime Minister. He was a known source of patronage and of intercession with the king. This spilled over into personal profit, whether such minor gifts as food and drink, or larger rewards of money and appointments to estate office and trusteeship by those seeking his favour.

The nineteenth century classed Bray as an architect. It would be more accurate to call him a prodigious builder, both on his own behalf, and by funding and assisting friends and projects in which he took an interest. He built, for example, at his houses of Edgcote, which Henry VII briefly visited in 1498, and at Eaton, now known as Eaton Bray, in Bedfordshire. His presence among the donor portraits in the great 'Magnificat' window at Great Malvern Priory suggests that he part funded the costs. He contributed to Jesus College in Cambridge and lent his assistance to Bishop Oliver King for building works at Bath Abbey. In January 1503 he helped to lay the foundation stone of the king's new chapel in Westminster Abbey. The major beneficiary, however, was St George's Chapel, Windsor, both during Bray's life, and under the terms of his will.

== Personal life ==
Bray married, about 1475, Katherine Hussey (d.1506), the younger of the two daughters and coheirs of Nicholas Hussey of Calais, by whom he had no issue. Katherine brought him lands in Harting, Sussex, and claims to lands in Berkshire and Hampshire. The bulk of Bray's large estates, however, were acquired after 1485, some gained by exploiting his position and privilege.

Bray died without issue on 5 August 1503, and was buried in St George's Chapel, Windsor. Bray had a brother of the whole blood, John Bray, and an elder half brother, also named John Bray. After litigation, Reginald Bray's estates were divided between his nephew, Edmund Bray, eldest son of his brother of the whole blood, John Bray, and William Sandys, 1st Baron Sandys, who had married Margery Bray, the daughter of Bray's elder brother of the half blood, John Bray.

== After-Life ==
No tomb is extant for Bray, although a coffin said to be his was found in 1740. The extent of his financial contribution to the building works for the completion of the chapel first begun at Windsor by King Edward IV is, however, marked by repeated stone bosses and other decoration in stone, metal, and other materials. They display his coat of arms or his initials within the garter, and above all, his rebus of the hemp-brake or hemp-bray. The hemp-bray was a fairly crude implement used to separate the fibres of hemp from the tough outer coating of the dried stems of the plant, and was an effective pun on Bray's name. By one count, one hundred and seventy five examples are found in the Chapel. A further ten such images, carved in wood, have recently been added by way of embellishments to the new furniture created by Treske of Thirsk for the Bray Chapel. In the twenty-first century Bray was again remembered and memorialised for his benefaction. As part of a fundraising effort for major works, the dean and canons established a 'Bray Fellowship' with HRH Prince Philip, Duke of Edinburgh, as honorary senior fellow, recognising the contributions of ten major donors to the works. A Canadian Bray fellowship was also established, with similar aims. In 2017 the Royal Mail issued a commemorative set of postage stamps celebrating Windsor Castle and St George's Chapel in which one of the quartet of stamps showing the Chapel was an illustration of a stone roof boss carved with Bray's initials set within the garter.

== Notes ==
Political offices
Preceded by Thomas Metcalfe	Chancellor of the Duchy of Lancaster; 1486–1503	Succeeded by Sir John Mordaunt
