= John Thomson (MP) =

16th-century English politician

John Thomson (1521–1597), of Husborne Crawley, Bedfordshire, and Aldersgate, London, was an English politician.

He was a member (MP) of the parliament of England for New Windsor in 1571 and Bedfordshire in 1572.

Parliament of England
Preceded by George Rotheram; Sir Henry Cheyne	Member of Parliament for Bedfordshire; 1572–1583; With: George Rotheram	Succeeded by George Rotheram; Nicholas Luke
