= Sir Roger Burgoyne, 2nd Baronet =

English politician

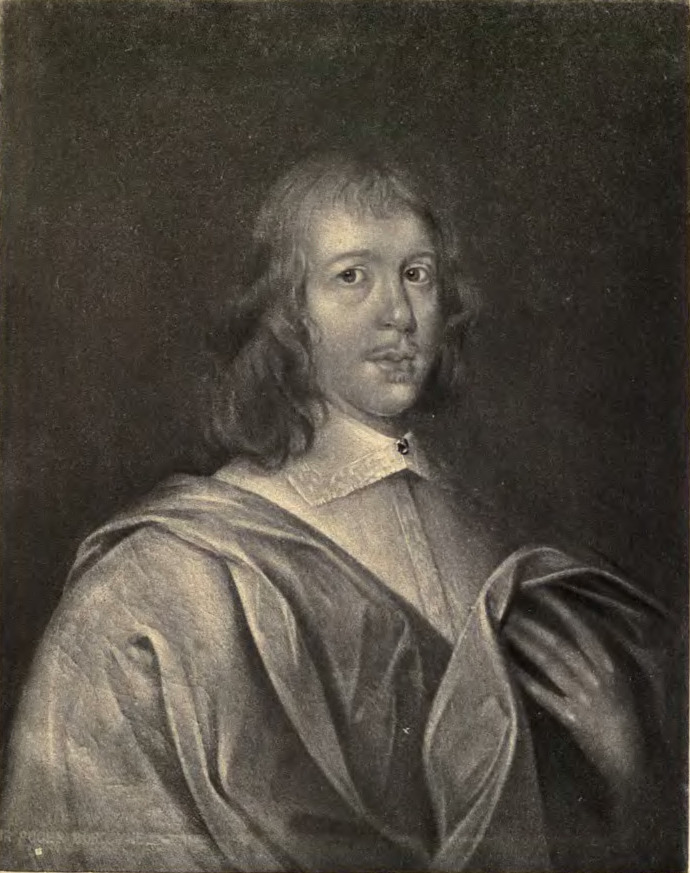
- Born: 1618
- Died: 16 September 1677 (aged 58–59)
- Spouse(s): Anne Robinson, Anne Snelling
- Children: Sir John Burgoyne, 3rd Bt.
- Parent(s): Sir John Burgoyne, 1st Baronet; Jane Kempe

Sir Roger Burgoyne, 2nd Baronet (1618 – 16 September 1677) was an English politician who sat in the House of Commons at various times between 1641 and 1656.

Burgoyne was the son of Sir John Burgoyne, 1st Baronet of Sutton, Bedfordshire, and Wroxall, Warwickshire, and his wife Jane Kempe, daughter of Julius Kempe, of Spains Hall, Finchingfield, Essex. He was baptised at Wroxall on 10 March 1618. He was admitted at Emmanuel College, Cambridge on 22 October 1634 and admitted at Lincoln's Inn on 11 November 1637. In 1641, Burgoyne was elected Member of Parliament for Bedfordshire in the Long Parliament after the sitting MP was raised to the House of Lords. He was knighted on 18 July 1641 He sat in parliament until 1648 when he was excluded under Pride's Purge. In 1656 he was elected MP for Warwickshire in the Second Protectorate Parliament.

Burgoyne succeeded to the baronetcy on the death of his father in 1657. He presented Edward Stillingfleet, later Bishop of Worcester, to the rectory of Sutton, where Stillingfleet wrote his Originas Sacra, when he was a young man. Burgoyne was High Sheriff of Bedfordshire in 1661.

Burgoyne died at the age of 59 and was buried in Sutton church.

Burgoyne married Anne Snelling, daughter of Charles Snelling, merchant of London, by whom he had several children. He married secondly Anne Robinson, daughter of John Robinson, of Dighton, Yorkshire, by whom he had further children. He was succeeded in the baronetcy by his son John.

Parliament of England
Preceded by The Lord Wentworth; Sir Oliver Luke	Member of Parliament for Bedfordshire; 1640–1648; With: Sir Oliver Luke	Succeeded by Not represented in Rump Parliament
Preceded by Richard Lucy; Thomas Willoughby; Sir Richard Temple	Member of Parliament for Warwickshire; 1656; With: Richard Lucy; Edward Peyto; Joseph Hawkesworth	Succeeded by Richard Lucy; Joseph Hawkesworth
Political offices
Preceded by Edmund Wilde	High Sheriff of Bedfordshire; 1661–1662	Succeeded by Francis Wingate
Baronetage of England
Preceded by John Burgoyne	Baronet (of Sutton); 1657–1677	Succeeded by John Burgoyne
