= Moggerhanger House =

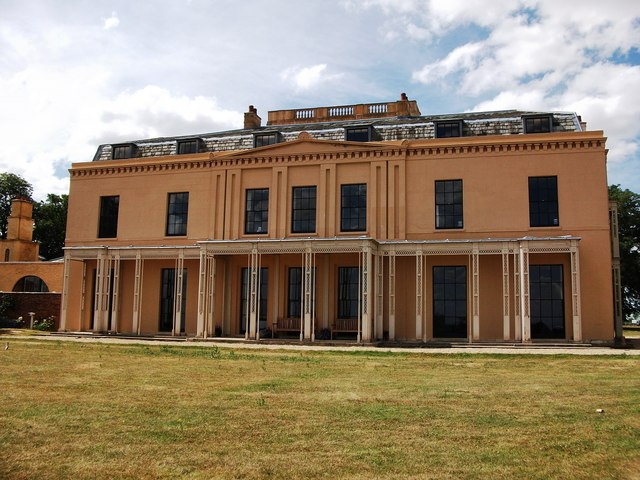

- Location within Bedfordshire

General information
- Type: Manor house
- Architectural style: Georgian architecture
- Location: Moggerhanger, Bedfordshire, England
- Coordinates: 52.12465°N 0.34291°W
- Ordnance Survey: TL1353248665
- Construction started: 1790
- Completed: 1812
- Renovated: 1994

Design and construction
- Architect: John Soane
- Other designers: Humphry Repton

Renovating team
- Architect: Peter Inskip

Website
- moggerhangerpark.com

Moggerhanger House is a Grade I-listed country house in Moggerhanger, Bedfordshire, England, designed by the eminent architect John Soane. The house is owned by a Christian charity, Harvest Vision, and the Moggerhanger House Preservation Trust, and has recently undergone a £7m refurbishment project with help from organisations such as the Heritage Lottery Fund, English Heritage, World Monuments Fund and the East of England Development Agency.

== History ==
The original house at Moggerhanger was small and of Georgian design. The house was acquired by Godfrey Thornton, a Bank of England director, who commissioned the Bank's architect, John Soane, to remodel it between 1790 and 1793. More substantial work would follow when Thornton's son Stephen inherited the house. Soane continued from 1806 until the scheme was completed in 1812 while the Bank of England reconstruction was under way. Soane remodelled Moggerhanger entirely, enlarging it to the west, relocating the entrance to the north and reproofing the house completely. He incorporated his previous work from 1793 maintaining symmetries and Classical axes. Soane experimented with decoration, using it as a prototype for future work.

As Ptolemy Dean notes, "with so much of the old fabric concealed by later finishes, it was little wonder that the importance of this building had been so under-recognised. The sense that this house and estate would soon emerge as one of Soane's key masterpieces was unimaginable."

The house was rendered by Soane using "Parker's Roman Cement" of biscuit-brown color. This was a new material, patented hydraulic lime render, of his time. The garden side of seven bays has a wooden veranda. In the centre is a shallow pediment on pilaster strips with sunk panels. The entrance has a low centre with a semicircular porch of Greek Doric columns of the Delos type. The end bays have on the ground floor arched windows with broad Grecian pediment over. Behind the porch is a square entrance hall once with a shallow dome. The window bars are painted dark grey, which causes the window detail to disappear so that pure shapes of openings are clearly visible appearing like punch recesses. Inside there is an all-cantilevered staircase with simple iron balustrade.

The gardens were designed by noted landscaper Humphry Repton. Only three other houses of Soane's are still standing: Pitzhanger Manor in Ealing, Tyringham Hall in Buckinghamshire, and Pell Wall Hall in Shropshire, plus the library at Stowe House in Buckinghamshire.

The house was used as a hospital for most of the 20th century. In 1919 it was opened as a TB isolation hospital, and then became an orthopedic hospital in the late 1950s. In 1960 it was renamed Park Hospital, but closed in 1987 when a new wing was built in Bedford Hospital

Modern Era

The house was bought by local developers, Twigden who had failed to obtain the necessary planning permission to convert the house into offices or apartments. The house was slipping into a state of disrepair with leaking roofs and dry rot. Under pressure from the County Preservation Officer, the developers obtained planning permission in 1993 as an ‘enabling’ concession to allow them to build 12 modest houses in the grounds around the house and in the walled gardens.

Twigden then gifted the house and 15 acres of parkland to Harvest Vision (£1 was required from Harvest Vision only by way of consideration contractually) on condition that they took all responsibility for the essential repairs on the house which they estimated at a cost of £350,000. Harvest Vision was a Christian trust set up by the Rev Dr Clifford Hill and Mrs Monica Hill for the purpose of owning and managing buildings as bases for two national charities but also for the Centre for Contemporary Ministry (CCM). This was their educational ministry providing in-service training for clergy and church leaders based at that time at Bawtry Hall in Yorkshire. The trust raised £500k from their supporters and so were able additionally to purchase the Stable Block for their offices, plus two Gatehouses and the Bungalow. They ran the house as a community project with a large number of volunteers beginning the work of restoration with a further grant from English Heritage to replace the roof. Twigden Homes then ceased trading and were subsumed by Kier

In 1997 the house was upgraded from a grade 2* to grade 1 listing and due to the house being the only remaining country house built by Sir John Soane that was capable of full restoration, English Heritage urged HV make an application to the National Heritage Memorial Fund for a grant to carry out the necessary work which was beyond their financial ability. NHMF offered a £3.5 million grant on condition that the 12 houses previously proposed by Twigden were not built.

Harvest Vision were then advised to bid for a grant from the Landfill Tax provision of £1.2 million to acquire the land on which the proposed houses were to be built upon. This was an amazing opportunity to add the original Humphry Repton landscape to the grounds around the House. The NHMF grant was then to be paid through the newly established Heritage Lottery Fund. One of the conditions imposed for the grant approval was the establishment of a Preservation Trust to carry out the restoration work. This therefore now applied to both the Soane Architecture and the Repton landscape.

In 1998 Harvest Vision therefore established the Moggerhanger House Preservation Trust (MHPT) with Harvest Vision as the only member to carry out the restoration while they concentrated on the usage. They appointed Mr Mark Eddison, a London architect to design the necessary restoration plans. He was later succeeded by Peter Inskip, a local architect with particular knowledge of Sir John Soane’s work. The chairman of MHPT, Andrew Ingrey Senn, a local businessman, was succeeded by Sir Sam Whitbread in 2007 and then by Lady Isabelle Errol in 2008.

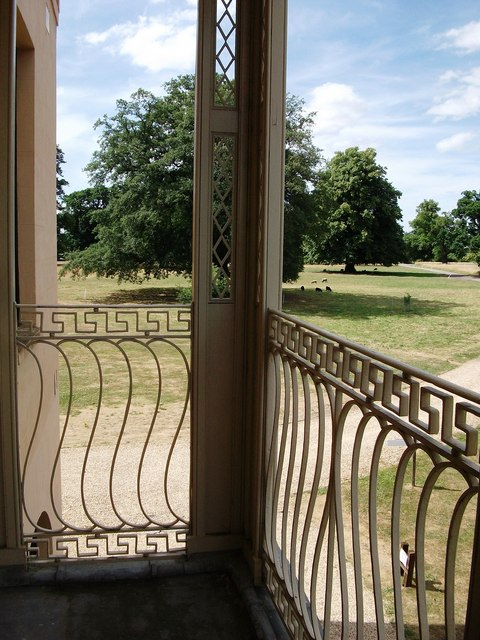
Moggerhanger House balcony

Soane's lengthy relationship with the house provided a backdrop for him to experiment, said Peter Inskip, the architect who oversaw the historic restoration. "In the records you could see a friendship develop between architect and client over 40 years," Inskip said. "This allowed Soane to experiment, so there are things here that tell us about aspects of some of the buildings that were lost. Through the depth of research and unpicking we have revealed a great work of art which has been ignored for 100 years. Soane is similar to the great British architects Jones, Wren, and Hawksmoor in his skill.

Initial Restoration

Isabelle Hay, Countess of Erroll, who lived at nearby Woodbury Hall was chair in 2009 and commented .. "All the original woodwork, the doors, bits of decorative ceilings, mantels, flags and fireplace surrounds, remnants of wallpapers, were all still there," the countess said. "It is such a fine example – there isn't another like it."[1]

The on-site Ministries were all working through Harvest Vision who passed the responsibility for coordinating and managing the use of the building and estate back to CCM who in 1999 changed their charitable objectives to include management of buildings. They appointed Simon Cooper as Manager working closely with his wife Jenny. Together they worked closely with the local community to establish a popular local resource largely run by volunteers. By 2003, MHPT needed to show ownership in order to regain VAT on the restoration, and to be responsible for major grants. They therefore formed Moggerhanger Park Ltd, a company that ran on community rather than commercial lines. Moggerhanger Park Ltd became the trading arm of MHPT with Harvest Vision remaining in ultimate control, and Simon Cooper became the first Managing Director. The Heritage Lottery Fund was then able to donate £3.3 million toward the project, and by 2005 the expenditure had approached £7 million. "We keep finding new wonderful things which cost money to restore," Lady Erroll said in 2009. "We have had to make sacrifice, which is why the car park hasn't been done yet, the Repton grounds haven't been restored and we have no furniture." All this work was subsequently carried out in 2005 and paid for in grants obtained by the Ministries and MP Ltd.

Soane's lengthy relationship with the house provided a backdrop for him to experiment, said Peter Inskip, the architect who oversaw the historic restoration. "In the records you could see a friendship develop between architect and client over 40 years," Inskip said. "This allowed Soane to experiment, so there are things here that tell us about aspects of some of the buildings that were lost. Through the depth of research and unpicking we have revealed a great work of art which has been ignored for 100 years. Soane is up there with the great British architects – Inigo Jones, Wren, Hawksmoor." Some of Soane’s experimental work at Moggerhanger House he subsequently used in the Cabinet Room at number 10 Downing Street.

This initial restoration project took 10 years to complete, and Harvest Vision formed a small residential community with members of the Ministries and from local village and local churches, volunteering help and support to complete the work and maintain the site whilst building contractors were working.

Recognising the historic value of the House and its inappropriateness for many of the ministry activities, CCM obtained an educational grant for the Trust to move and restore the Garden Room, (the one ward they had retained for their use from the hospital era) and move to a new site alongside the Walled Gardens as a community asset so that the Repton restoration of the surrounding parkland around the House could be brought back to its original splendour. This housed a distinctive library, community room and facilities and was let out to local communities for a donation. It is now used for exhibitions and tea rooms.

In 2008 Simon and Jenny Cooper left following a change to ‘commercialism’ in the overall emphasis of the organisation.

Then in 2010, CCM turned its attention to the neighbouring land and purchased Park Farm, formerly known as Home Farm when part of the Thornton Estate - and a further 60 acres of land to the north of the estate from the Council. CCM then adapted them to operate youth and community work there until 2016, when the Park and Farmland were transferred to the main estate in 2020.

== The present ==
The house is now used as a conference and training centre for most of the year, but opens as a tourist attraction from mid-June to mid-September, during which time public tours are conducted twice daily.

Free access to the grounds is available throughout the year. There is a spacious tea room and children's play area within the grounds.

The house had become a centre of local community activities and its successful restoration so far has been a triumph for the local village and for Bedfordshire.

It continues to need maintenance and more recently Covid has affected its continuing development but it is hoped that further developments will take place shortly.

The Moggerhanger House Preservation Trust, a registered charity, is currently trying to secure funds to restore Humphrey Repton’s 33-acre (130,000 m^{2}) parkland surrounding the house.

In March 2024, the Moggerhanger House Preservation Trust came under public scrunity for attempting to shut the house and its ground to the public so as to use the ground for private religious activities. One of the leading members of the trust, Danny Stupple, has previously been at the centre of controversy after calling the Islamic religion "demonic" in 2023, a comment that resulted in a government grant of over £40,000 being revoked from Zion Projects, a separate charity on which he sat chair.
