= Jacqueline Burgoyne =

British sociologist

- Born: 10 September 1944; Worcester
- Died: 10 January 1988 (aged 43)
- Occupation: Academic

Academic background
- Education: University of Sheffield

Academic work
- Discipline: Sociologist
- Sub-discipline: Families
- Institutions: Sheffield City Polytechnic
- Notable works: Making a Go of It: A Study of Step-Families in Sheffield (1984)

Jacqueline Lesley Burgoyne (10 September 1944 – 10 January 1988) was a British sociologist and academic who specialised in family life.

== Career ==
Jacqueline Burgoyne was born in Worcester on 10 September 1944 and schooled at Bristol. She enrolled at the University of Sheffield in 1963 and completed a sociology degree, before qualifying as a teacher in Bath and then returning to Sheffield to work on a project which would lead to her first book, Books and Reading (1969), the result of a collaboration with Peter H. Mann; after its completion, she worked as a teacher and then in 1971 joined Sheffield City College of Education (later Sheffield City Polytechnic and later still Sheffield Hallam University) as a lecturer. She was a founding editor of Polity Press's Family Life series of books and, in 1987, she was appointed to the Economic and Social Research Council's Behaviour and Human Development Group and in the same year was appointed to the editorial board of the journal Sociology. Burgoyne remained at Sheffield Polytechnic for the rest of her academic career, before dying of ovarian cancer on 10 January 1988. She was the dedicatee of a posthumous festschrift edited by David Clark: Marriage, Domestic Life and Social Change (1991). After her death, Sheffield Polytechnic founded a memorial collection in their library for Burgoyne, and established an annual memorial lecture series.

== Research ==
Burgoyne's sociological research began with a study of books and reading, before moving on to families, divorce and remarriage. A major aspect of her research in the late 1970s and early 1980s focused on stepfamilies and the children of divorced parents who married again, which had largely been studied from a psychological or therapeutic (and thus individual-focused) perspective up to that time; instead, her lengthy interviews revealed that the impact of divorce and marital failure was both a private and a public experience related to effects on employment, finance and legal proceedings. Interviewees frequently included accounts of these interactions in discussions about their marital history and the development of step-families; often, divorced parents who remarried found their situation frustrated by continuities from their previous marriage relating to issues such as child custody or maintenance, and complications when trying to establish a new family. As David Clark, who collaborated with Burgoyne on the project, later recalled: "It was these issues which constituted the main agenda for [her] intellectual interests and which constantly brought her back to key themes: public/private, structure/process, outer/inner, biography/history". Her research also focused on the gender dynamics of family life and on the psychodynamics of families and family counselling, on cohabitation (researched with Paul Wild), and divorce, which she studied with Martin Richards and Sir Roger Ormrod by borrowing ideas from sociology, psychology and law. As Sheffield's steel industry disappeared in the 1980s, she also worked with Nick Forster to study the effects of unemployment on families, and towards the end of her life became interested in women working in management roles.

== Selected publications ==
- (Co-authored with Peter H. Mann) Books and Reading (Andre Deutsch, 1969).
- What Are We Doing to The Children? (BBC Publications, 1982).
- (Co-authored with David Clark) Making a Go of It: A Study of Step-Families in Sheffield (Routledge and Kegan Paul, 1984).
- Breaking Even: Divorce, Your Children and You (Penguin, 1984).
- (Co-authored with Sir Roger Ormrod and Martin Richards) Divorce Matters (Penguin, 1987).
