= Thomas Burgoyne =

Thomas Burgoyne may refer to:

- Thomas Burgoyne (cricketer, born 1775) (1775–1847), English cricketer
- Thomas Burgoyne (cricketer, born 1805) (1805–1879), his son, English cricketer
- Thomas Burgoyne (Australian politician) (1827–1920), builder and politician in the colony of South Australia
- Thomas Burgoyne (Bere Alston MP), member of parliament for Bere Alston
- Thomas Burgoyne (Cambridgeshire MP), member of parliament for Cambridgeshire
