= Mindie Burgoyne =

American writer and businessperson

Mindie Burgoyne is an American writer and businessperson. She works for the Maryland Department of Business and Economic Development and has written several books about the history and folklore of the Eastern Shore of Maryland. She is the founder and owner of Chesapeake Ghost Walks.

== Background ==
Burgoyne has lived in the Baltimore–Washington metropolitan area for most of her life. At age 16, she composed a musical score for a promotional film, some of which was later used on national television.

Since 1991, Burgoyne has led an annual archeological field trip to Ireland. In 2002, she worked for the Snow Hill town government. She owned a business development company before working for the Maryland Department of Business and Economic Development as a business development representative from 2005. In 2005, she also founded the Tourism, Arts, and Downtown Development (TADD) collective to help coordinate business resources across the state. Burgoyne has also worked as a business development representative and a field reporter for the Government of Maryland.

== Writing ==
Burgoyne's first two books, Snow Hill and Easton, are part of Arcadia Publishing's "Images of America" series. Snow Hill is a historical book containing stories and photographs of Snow Hill, Maryland.

Burgoyne researched folklore for three years at Salisbury University for her 2009 book Haunted Eastern Shore, which she was inspired to write after moving into a house where she sensed hauntings. The book is a compilation of stories about the Eastern Shore. By 2015, Haunted Eastern Shore had sold 10,000 copies. In 2015, Burgoyne published The Haunted Mid-Shore, a book that contains 25 stories from Maryland's mid-shore region. It is the second of a three-book series about the folklore of the Delmarva Peninsula.

Burgoyne also conducts tours of supposedly haunted sites following stories from her books.

== Personal life ==
Burgoyne maintains a travel blog and writes about a variety of topics. In 2002, she and her husband, Dan, moved to the Vance Miles House in Marion Station, Maryland. They have six children.

== Works ==
- Burgoyne, Mindie (2006). Snow Hill. Arcadia Publishing. ISBN 0738543446. OCLC 84836368.
- Burgoyne, Mindie (2007). Easton. Arcadia Publishing. ISBN 9780738553122.
- Burgoyne, Mindie (2009). Haunted Eastern Shore: Ghostly Tales from East of the Chesapeake. Arcadia Publishing. ISBN 9781625852854.
- Burgoyne, Mindie (2014). Haunted Ocean City and Berlin. Arcadia Publishing. ISBN 9781625852847.
- Burgoyne, Mindie (2015). The Haunted Mid-Shore: Spirits of Caroline, Dorchester and Talbot Counties. Arcadia Publishing. ISBN 9781625853400.
- Burgoyne, Mindie (2016). Haunted Lower Eastern Shore: Spirits of Somerset, Wicomico and Worcester Counties. History Press. ISBN 9781626198098.
