= Diana Burgoyne =

Canadian artist

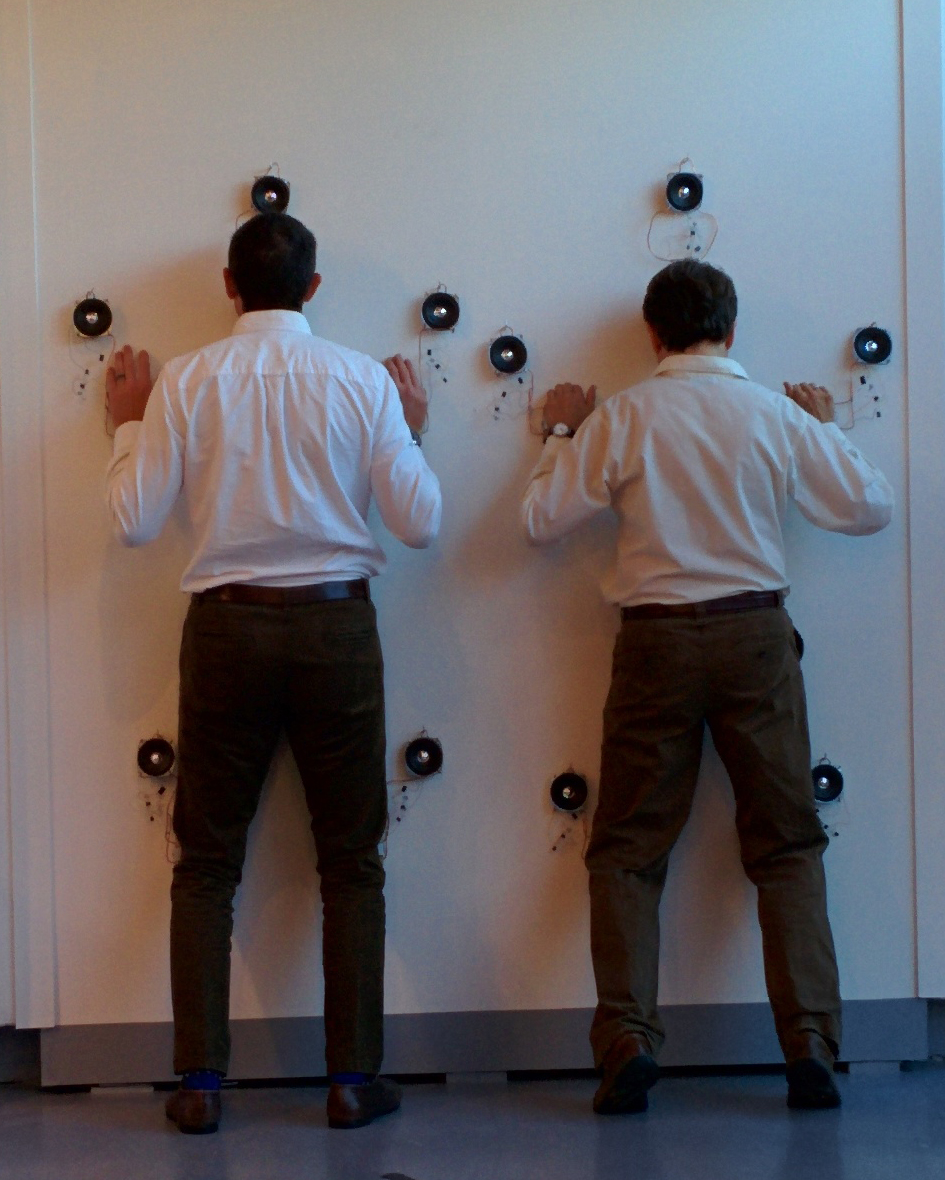
- Performance at Museum of Vancouver in August 2015
- Born: 1957 (age 67–68); Ottawa, Ontario, Canada
- Education: University of Victoria; University of California, Los Angeles
- Known for: interactive electronic installation and performance artist
- Website: http://www.connect.ecuad.ca/~dburg/main.htm

Diana Burgoyne (born 1957) is a Canadian artist known for her installations and performance works using handmade electronics.

== Career ==
Since the mid-1980s, Burgoyne has produced work that combines handmade electronics with aspects of sculpture, installation and live performance. Her work looks at the interaction of society, technology, culture, and environment, and their impact on the human body.

== Exhibitions ==
- The Western Front, Vancouver
- The Mattress Factory, Pittsburgh
- The University of Toronto Art Centre,
- Exploratorium, San Francisco
