= Cranfield Court =

Coordinates: 52.0610°N 0.6086°W

Cranfield Court was a country house in Cranfield, Bedfordshire, England. It belonged to the Harter family.

The last house at the site was Elizabethan, and designed by Thomas Chambers Hine of Nottingham for Reverend G. G. Harter in 1862–4. In 1912 the house was described as "a large modern red-brick building with Bath stone dressings, in the French Gothic style". At that time it belonged to the widow of James Francis Hatfield Harter. Harter had served as the Justice of the Peace for Bedfordshire and Buckinghamshire, and was High Sheriff of Bedfordshire in 1885. The house, which was compared to Battlesden House in style, was later demolished.
