= Robert D. Burgoyne =

British physiologist and neuroscientist

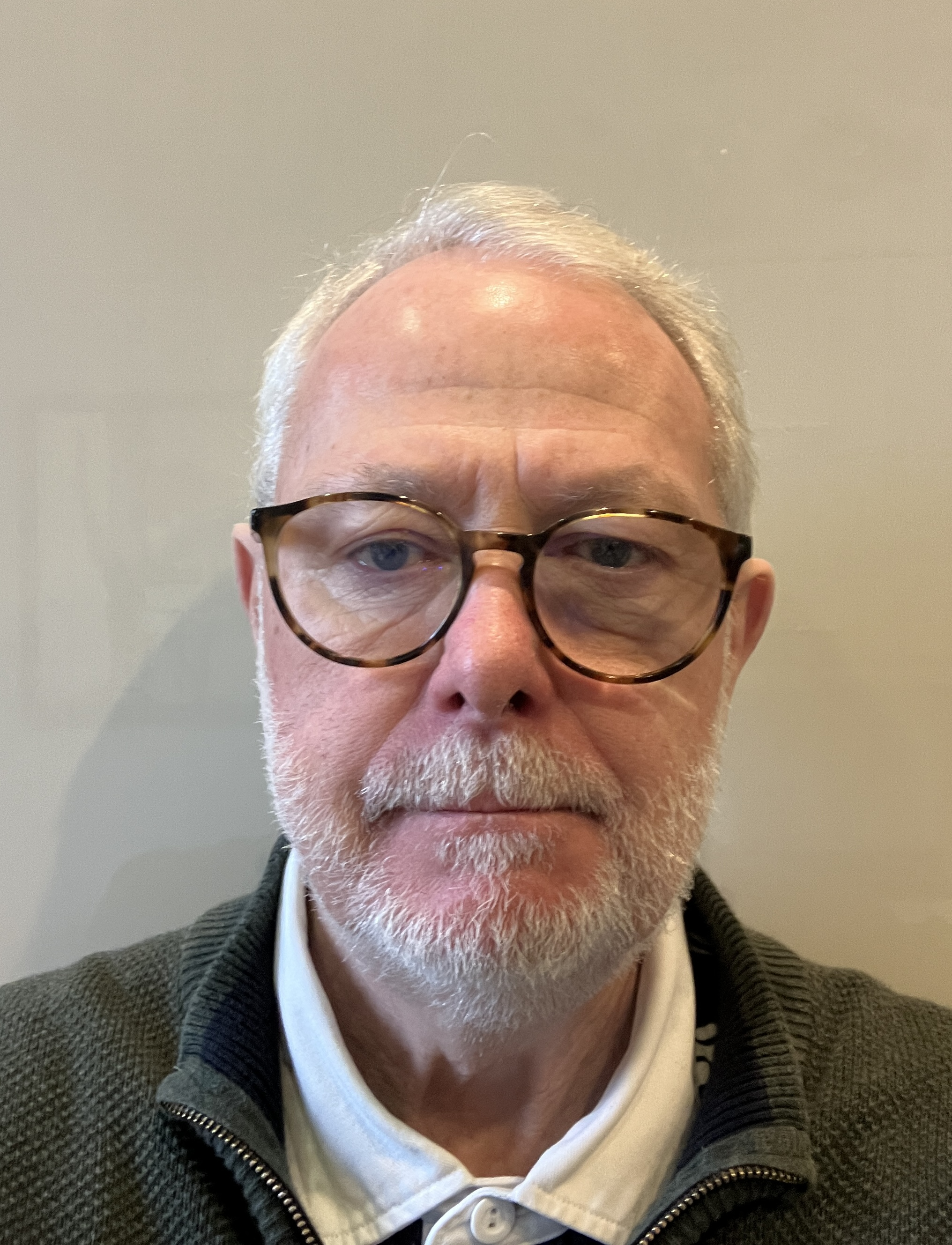
- Burgoyne in 2024
- Education: University of Birmingham (BSc, PhD)
- Awards: Fellow of the Academy of Medical Sciences
- Scientific career
- Fields: Physiology; Neuroscience
- Institutions: University of Liverpool

Robert D. Burgoyne (born 1953) is a British physiologist and neuroscientist and Emeritus Professor of Physiology at the University of Liverpool. He was elected a Fellow of the Academy of Medical Sciences in 2002. He was elected a member of Academia Europaea in 2001.

== Education and academic career ==
Bob Burgoyne received a Bachelor of Science degree in Bacteriology in 1974 and a PhD in Microbiology in 1977 from the University of Birmingham.

Following postdoctoral research at the Open University and the MRC National Institute for Medical Research in London, he joined the University of Liverpool in 1983 as a lecturer in physiology and was appointed Professor of Physiology in 1990.

He served as Head of the School of Biomedical Sciences from 2004 to 2009 building up research capacity within the School.

He was involved in establishing a research fellowship scheme at Liverpool intended to enable early-career scientists to focus on research activity and which received national attention.

Burgoyne later held senior leadership roles within the Faculty of Health and Life Sciences, including Associate Pro-Vice-Chancellor for Research and Executive Pro-Vice-Chancellor. He subsequently became Emeritus Professor of Physiology at Liverpool.

He served as a Non-Executive Director and Senior Independent Director of Liverpool Heart and Chest Hospital NHS Foundation Trust from 2019 to 2025, and in that capacity chaired the Trust’s charity.

== Research ==
Burgoyne’s research has focused on molecular mechanisms underlying neurotransmission, particularly calcium-dependent regulation of synaptic vesicle exocytosis and the function of neuronal calcium sensor (NCS) proteins.

His publication record and research output have been indexed by academic analytics services.

== Selected publications ==
- Christoforidis, S.; McBride, H. M.; Burgoyne, R. D.; Zerial, M. (1999). "The Rab5 effector EEA1 is a core component of endosome docking". Nature. 397 (6720): 621–625. doi:10.1038/17618.
- Burgoyne, R. D.; Morgan, A. (2003). "Secretory granule exocytosis". Physiological Reviews. 83 (2): 581–632. doi:10.1152/physrev.00031.2002.
- Burgoyne, R. D. (2007). "Neuronal calcium sensor proteins: generating diversity in neuronal Ca2+ signalling". Nature Reviews Neuroscience. 8 (3): 182–193. doi:10.1038/nrn2093.
- Burgoyne, R. D.; Weiss, J. L. (2001). "The neuronal calcium sensor family of Ca2+-binding proteins". Biochemical Journal. 353 (1): 1–12. doi:10.1042/0264-6021:3530001.
- Chamberlain, L. H.; Burgoyne, R. D.; Gould, G. W. (2001). "SNARE proteins are highly enriched in lipid rafts in PC12 cells: implications for the spatial control of exocytosis". Proceedings of the National Academy of Sciences of the United States of America. 98 (10): 5619–5624. doi:10.1073/pnas.091152398.
- Ali, S. M.; Geisow, M. J.; Burgoyne, R. D. (1989). "A role for calpactin in calcium-dependent exocytosis in adrenal chromaffin cells". Nature. 340 (6231): 313–315. doi:10.1038/340313a0.
- Pearce, I. A.; Cambray-Deakin, M. A.; Burgoyne, R. D. (1987). "Glutamate acting on NMDA receptors stimulates neurite outgrowth from cerebellar granule cells". FEBS Letters. 223 (1): 143–147. doi:10.1016/0014-5793(87)80315-3.
- Burgoyne, R. D.; Geisow, M. J. (1989). "The annexin family of calcium-binding proteins". Cell Calcium. 10 (1): 1–10. doi:10.1016/0143-4160(89)90001-6.
- Burgoyne, R. D. (1991). "Control of exocytosis in adrenal chromaffin cells". Biochimica et Biophysica Acta (BBA) - Reviews on Biomembranes. 1071 (2): 174–202. doi:10.1016/0005-2736(91)90044-5.

== Personal life ==
Burgoyne was married to Jenny for 43 years until her death in 2023.

Their twin sons are both academic researchers in biomedical sciences. Joe Burgoyne is a researcher in cardiovascular sciences at King's College London, and Tom Burgoyne leads a research group at the UCL Institute of Ophthalmology, part of University College London.
