= Cranfield =

Village near Milton Keynes, England

Coordinates: 52.0699°N 0.6081°W

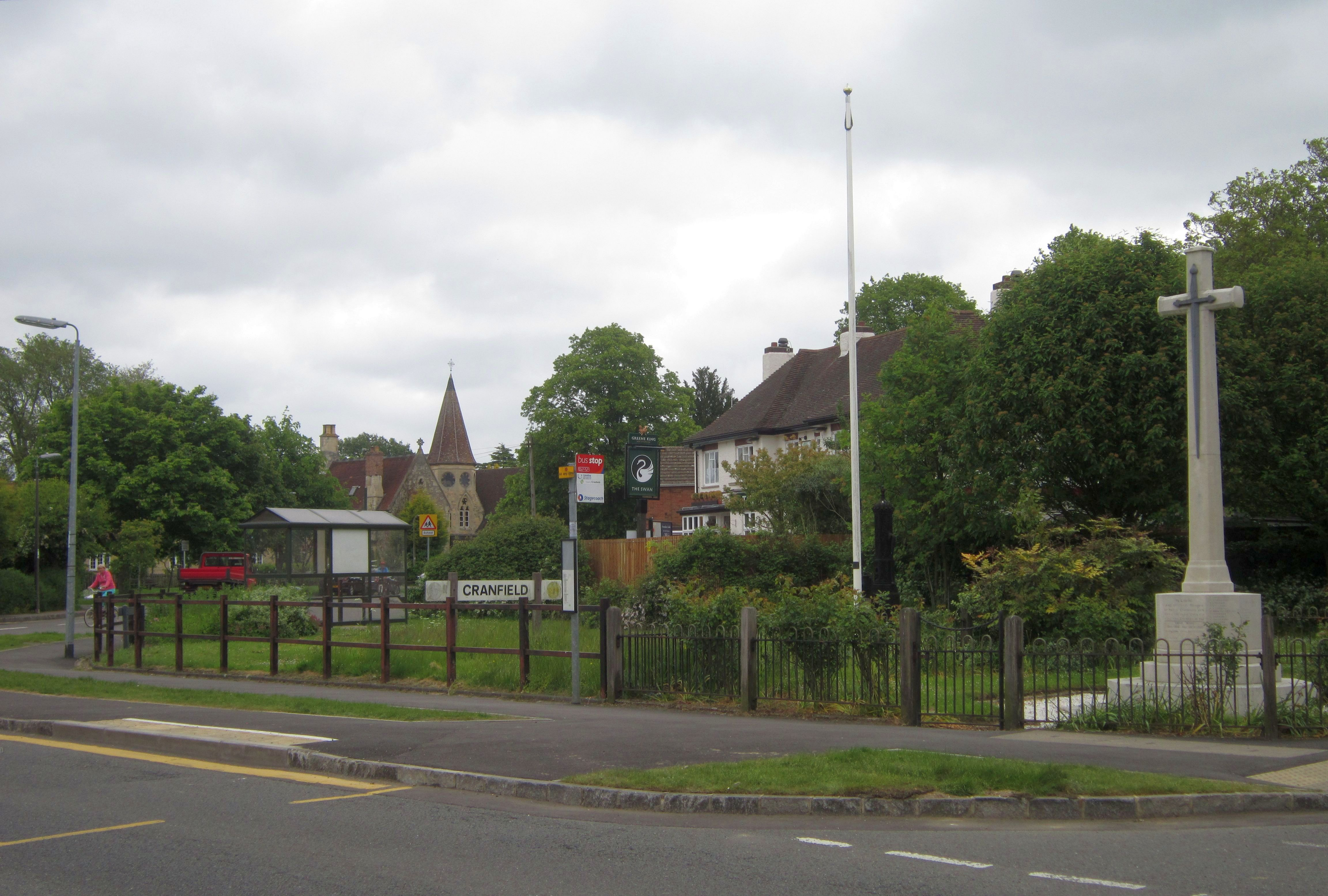
- Village centre

- Location within Bedfordshire
- Interactive map of Cranfield
- Population: 4,909 (2001); 5,369 (2011 census)
- OS grid reference: SP959425
  - London: 52 miles (84 km)
- Civil parish: Cranfield
- Unitary authority: Central Bedfordshire
- Ceremonial county: Bedfordshire
- Region: East
- Country: England
- Sovereign state: United Kingdom
- Post town: Bedford
- Postcode district: MK43
- Dialling code: 01234
- Police: Bedfordshire
- Fire: Bedfordshire
- Ambulance: East of England
- UK Parliament: Mid Bedfordshire

Cranfield is a village and civil parish in the west of Bedfordshire, England, situated between Bedford and Milton Keynes. It had a population of 4,909 in 2001, increasing to 5,369 at the 2011 census. The parish is in Central Bedfordshire unitary authority. It is best known for being the home of Cranfield University and Cranfield Airport (an airfield).

The hamlet of Bourne End is located just north of Cranfield, and is part of the civil parish. Wharley End was a separate settlement, but now forms the northern part of Cranfield village, by the university.

== Amenities ==
Cranfield has two public houses, a football club, coffee shop, dog grooming salon, hairdressers, barbers, several take-away restaurants, two small supermarkets and two car dealerships. There is also a surgery and dentist's practice along with a pharmacy. Cranfield has a university, three schools, three parks and a multi-use games area.

The village Post Office is now contained within The Co-operative Group store; previously it was on separate premises near the centre of the village. Cranfield has one of only a small number of Morgan dealerships, in addition to a Ford dealer. There are further facilities at the university campus including a Post Office and bookshop.

The local newspaper is the Cranfield Express. There is a news hyperlocal website, Cranfield and Marston Vale Chronicle, giving village information, local and national news, etc.

The Church of St Peter and St Paul has records going back at least to 1600 and is notable for its recently restored bells.

Cranfield Court belonged to the Harter family. The last house was built in 1862–4 in the French Gothic style, but was later demolished.

== Sport and leisure ==
Cranfield has a Non-League football team Cranfield United F.C. who play at their own ground, The Nest, in Crawley Road, Cranfield, MK43 0AA.

== Airport ==
Cranfield's airfield was originally an RAF training airfield and was used after the war by the College of Aeronautics, which has now become Cranfield University.

In October 2021, Marshall Group announced that it is to transfer its Group headquarters and aerospace operations to Cranfield from Cambridge "by 2030". The Group proposes to move its global group headquarters (as well as its Aerospace division) to Cranfield Airport.

== University ==
Cranfield University is adjacent to the village, to the north of the airfield.

== Technology park ==
The Cranfield Technology Park is west of the university at the entrance to the campus. It is being developed on a phased basis by Cranfield University and its development partner. The park's objective is to encourage knowledge-based companies to locate their activities on the park and to encourage the growth of such companies. A major extension to the technology park was started in January 2007 using land on Cranfield Airport.

In August 2005 a new business incubation centre was opened. It was designed to encourage and support hi-tech and knowledge based pre-start and early start companies during the formative stages of their development.
