= Frank J. Burgoyne =

Welsh librarian; Chief librarian Monmouth Council (1911)

Francis James Burgoyne (1858 – 18 October 1913) was a British librarian and author. Born in Blaenavon, he was the Chief Librarian of Lambeth from 1887 until his death in 1913. According to an article in the South London Press, "under his care the Lambeth Libraries became the best equipped institutions of the kind in the Metropolis". An obituary in the Pall Mall Gazette said that "in addition to several authoritative works on public library administration, [he] published some important contributions to Baconian literature".

== Books ==
- Library construction, architecture, fittings, and furniture (1897), London: George Allen
- Public Libraries (1899, with J.M. Brydon), London: Royal Institute of British Architects
- Leycester's Commonwealth (1904), Longman's, Green & Co.
