= François Bourgoing (Dominican) =

Father François Bourgoing (died c. 1589) was a prior of the Dominicans in Paris. He was accused of having pushed the monk Jacques Clément to assassinate Henry III of France. He certainly, at least, celebrated Jacques and his deed from the pulpit as "the heroic action and the glorious martyr". Taking up arms for the assault on Paris's suburbs in November 1589, he was condemned by the parlement de Tours to be dismembered as a regicide.
