= William Burgoyne (cricketer) =

English cricketer

William Burgoyne (born 28 October 1942) was an English cricketer. He was a right-handed batsman and a right-arm medium-fast bowler who played for Berkshire. He was born in Windsor.

Burgoyne made his debut for Berkshire in a World Cup warm-up match against the Sri Lankans, though his Minor Counties debut followed six weeks later.

Burgoyne played in the Minor Counties Championship for two seasons, and played in his only List A match during the 1976 season, against Hertfordshire. He scored 0 not out with the bat, and took figures of 0–25 from 11 overs with the ball.
