= Thomas Metcalfe (courtier) =

Canting arms of Metcalfe: Argent, three calves sable

Thomas Metcalfe was the Chancellor of the Duchy of Lancaster between 7 July 1483 to 13 September 1486. He was a Privy Councillor in 1460. He was a trusted member of King Richard III's council, and, by reason of his position, judge of the Duchy court that sat at Westminster.

Thomas Metcalfe built Nappa Hall in Wensleydale, North Yorkshire in the 1470s.

He married Elizabeth Hartlington of Hartlington, in Craven, Yorkshire, heiress of an ancient family of Clifford tenants who had been bailiffs of Kettlewelldale.

On 30 September 1484, Richard III granted him wardship and control of the marriage of Henry Gage, the son and heir of John Gage, a gentleman who had held land direct from the Crown.
