= George Rotheram =

Member of the Parliament of England

George Rotheram (1541-1599) was a Member of Parliament for Bedfordshire.

The son of Thomas Rotheram and Alice Wellesford or Wilsford. He lived at Someries Castle, Luton, Rotheram married Jane Smith, daughter of Christopher Smith, MP of Annables, Hertfordshire. His second wife was Elizabeth Barnes, daughter of London mercer, Richard Barnes.

In 1597, he tried to acquire the title of the barony of Ruthin, but failed. He had a family tree drawn up by William Dethick to support his claim. Another branch of the family lived at Farley Hill, Luton, where Anne of Denmark stayed with Sir John Rotherham on 26 July 1605.
