= François Bourgoing (priest) =

François Bourgoing (1585 – 1662) was a superior general of the Oratory of Jesus. He succeeded Charles de Condren. He was a follower of Pierre de Bérulle.

== Biography ==
Bourgoing was born at Paris in 1585, to a family of magistrates. As a young man, he was curé of Clichy, before resigning in favor of Vincent de Paul.

After his resignation, Bourgoing joined the Oratory of Jesus, where he worked to found and direct new houses. He became the assistant of de Condren in 1631; when de Condren died in 1641, Bourgoing succeeded him as superior general of the order. As superior general, Bourgoing worked to develop and expand the order, and to combat Jansenism.

Bourgoing died in 1662. His funeral oration was given by Jacques-Bénigne Bossuet.

== Works ==
Bourgoing wrote a number of ascetical treatises. Two of his major works are:

- Vérités et excellences de Jésus Christ notre Sauveur
- Exercices de retraites
