= Burgoyne baronets =

There have been two baronetcies created for members of the Burgoyne family, one in the Baronetage of England and one in the Baronetage of the United Kingdom. Both creations are extinct.

- Burgoyne baronets of Sutton (1642)
- Burgoyne baronets of the Army (1856): see John Fox Burgoyne (1782–1871)
