= Thomas Clinton (MP) =

Sir Thomas Clinton (died 1415) was an English soldier and member of parliament.

== Private life ==
Clinton was a younger son of John de Clinton, 3rd Baron Clinton of Maxstoke, Warwickshire.

Clinton married twice: firstly Alice and secondly Joan, the daughter and coheiress of Sir Ralph Meynell (d. 1388), of Langley, Derbyshire and Newton Regis, Warwickshire and the widow of John Staunton of Staunton Harold, Leicestershire. Through Joan he acquired land in Burton Overy and Upton, Leicestershire, Newton Regis (Warwickshire), Langley (Derbyshire) and Staffordshire. With her he may have had one daughter.

On the death of his father in 1398 he inherited the manors of Hunton and Bensted in Kent, where he established the family home.

== Career ==
He was knighted before 1386.

He saw military service in Scotland and on John of Gaunt's expedition to Spain. He then transferred his allegiance to Thomas Mowbray, the Earl Marshal, following him to Ireland in 1394.

He was elected Member of Parliament for Warwickshire in January 1397 and for Kent in October 1404 and April 1414.

He died of disease in mid-1415 at the siege of Harfleur when campaigning in the service of the Duke of Gloucester. There is a memorial to him in the chancel of Hunton church.

Parliament of England
Preceded by William Bagot; William Spernore	Member of Parliament for Warwickshire; 1397; With: William Bagot	Succeeded by William Bagot; Thomas Crewe
Preceded by Arnold Savage and Sir Reynold Braybrooke	Member of Parliament for Kent; Oct. 1404; With: Henry Horne	Succeeded by Richard Clitheroe and Robert Clifford
Preceded by John Darell; John Butler	Member of Parliament for Kent; 1414; With: John Darell	Succeeded by Arnold Savage; Robert Clifford
