= Haute =

Haute may refer to:

== People ==
- Nicholas Haute (1357 – c.1415), English knight, landowner and politician
  - William Haute (MP) (1390-1462), son of Nicholas, Member of Parliament, English politician
  - William Hawte or Haute (c. 1430 - 1497), son of William, composer, involved in the Wars of the Roses
- Haute, the pseudonym of Michelle Buzz of the band Haute and Freddy

== Fictional characters ==
- Haute FancyPants, a character in Nexo Knights

== Music ==
- "Haute" (song), by Tyga, 2019
- "Haute", by Janelle Monáe from The Age of Pleasure, 2023

== See also ==
- Terre Haute (disambiguation)
