= William Bettenham =

English politician

William Bettenham (fl. 1386–1400) was an English politician. He was the Member of Parliament for Kent in 1386 and 1388.

Bettenham is described as coming "from the least affluent group". He possibly had a background in law.

As some point before June 1389, Bettenham married his wife, Alice. There is little information on him, but he is commonly associated with Stephen Bettenham (d. 1415) of Cranbrook, Kent, who may have been his brother or a close relation. Stephen was a successful lawyer and landowner, and obtained a place on the commission of the peace. William, however, is not thought to have been heavily involved in local politics or to have owned much land. He owned 130 acres of land in Staplehurst; this seems to have come to him through his marriage.

The last record of Bettenham alive is from February 1400.

Parliament of England
Preceded by Thomas Fogge	Member of Parliament for Kent; 1386; With: Geoffrey Chaucer	Succeeded by Thomas Fogge with James Peckham
Parliament of England
Preceded by Thomas Fogge with James Peckham	Member of Parliament for Kent; 1388; With: James Peckham	Succeeded by Arnold Savage with John Cobham
