= William Burcester =

14th-century English politician

Sir William Burcester (died 1407) was an English politician.

== Life ==
Burcester, whose name may have come from the town of Bicester, was originally from Oxfordshire.

At some point before July 1378, Burcester married the twice-widowed Margaret Gisors of London. She died 1 July 1393. On 6 January 1396, he married another widow named Margaret, the widow of the MP Thomas Brewes.

== Career ==
He was a tax-collector and justice of the peace for Kent.

He was knighted while fighting in France under the Earl of Stafford in 1378 or 1379 and appointed Sheriff of Kent for 1390. He was elected Member of Parliament for Kent in 1393.

He was apparently loyal to Richard II of England.

== Death ==
Burcester died at his manor house in Southwark. He was buried in the Minories. His heirs were his two children from his second marriage, John Burcester and Willelma, the wife of Walter Urry, MP. His widow remarried, to the MP John Berkeley I.

Parliament of England
Preceded by Arnold Savage with Nicholas Potyn	Member of Parliament for Kent; 1393; With: Nicholas Potyn	Succeeded by William Pecche with John Cobham
