= Nicholas Haute =

English knight, landowner and politician

Sir Nicholas Haute (20 September 1357 – c. 1415), of Wadden Hall (Wadenhall) in Petham and Waltham, with manors extending into Lower Hardres, Elmsted and Bishopsbourne, in the county of Kent, was an English knight, landowner and politician.

== Haute of Wadenhall ==
The de Haute family were established at Wadenhall from the 13th century, when Sir William de Haute (died c. 1302) held office as lay steward to Christchurch Priory, Canterbury. He was perhaps briefly succeeded by his son Henry de Haute, who married Margery, an heiress of the de Marinis (Marignes) family, and then by Henry's son Sir Henry de Haute (c.1300-1370), who succeeded to Wadenhale in 1321, after a period of wardship in his minority superintended by his uncle Richard de Haute. Henry de Haute the younger soon married Annabel atte Halle, of a Dover family to whose lands she became heir. Sir Henry had seisin of his share of the de Marinis patrimony, partible by gavelkind, in 1349. He had one son, (Sir) Edmund (before 1329-c.1360), who married Benedicta Shelving in around 1357 and was the father of Nicholas Haute.

The de Haut pedigree in the 1619 Visitation of Kent by the herald John Philipot, Rouge Dragon, and much of the research into the family's descent since that time, were dependent upon materials collected by Sir Edward Dering (1598–1644). Dering, long suspected of having "improved" his own ancestral claims (which passed into the de Haute family) by "creative" genealogy, is now shown to have falsified them by the actual forgery of documents and monuments. Important documents for the de Haute descent are included among the Harleian collections and charters at the British Library, and it is known that Sir Robert Harley acquired substantial amounts from Dering's collections. The path through the sources for this family therefore has to be trodden very cautiously.

== Young life ==
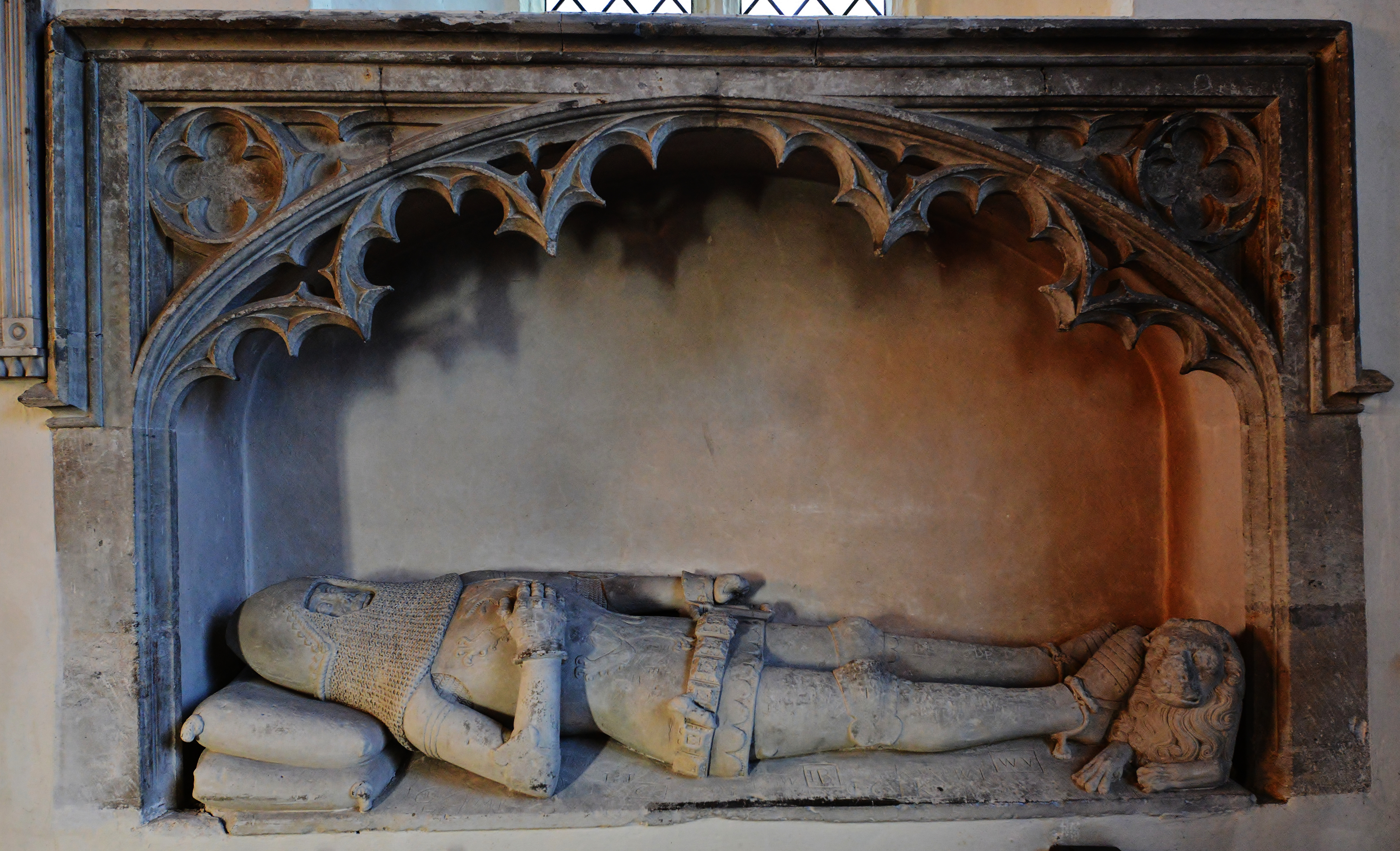
Tomb of Sir Thomas Cawne, father-in-law of Sir Nicholas Haute, at St Peter's church, Ightham

Nicholas Haute was the elder of two sons (the younger was Edward) of Sir Edmund de Haute and his wife Benedicta Shelving. Benedicta's father John de Shelving had died by 1331, when his inquisition showed that the manor of Bishopsbourne (Bourne Archiepiscopi), Kent, had come to him through the inheritance of his wife Benedicta. By Edmund's marriage Bishopsbourne passed to the Haute family and was sometimes known as Hautesbourne.

In 1358, in which year he had witnessed a charter on behalf of Christ Church Priory, Canterbury, an order was given for Sir Edmund Haute to be brought to the king's court to answer a charge. After this no more is heard of him, and Benedicta remarried (as his fourth wife) to the MP Sir Thomas Uvedale, of Titsey in Surrey, who died in 1367. Nicholas's grandfather Sir Henry de Haute was still living, but so weak that he had been granted special exemption from the king's commissions. Sir Henry had held Wadenhall of the archbishopric of Canterbury, and at his death in 1370 it was taken into the king's hands and granted in wardship to the archbishop during the minority of Nicholas Haute, then aged 13. Benedicta however maintained control of Wadenhall and Henry's other lands in Kent until Nicholas was of age in 1379, when he received knighthood and (having paid homage to the king) was granted seisin of his grandfather's lands. Bishopsbourne remained in Benedicta's right until her death.

== Marriages ==
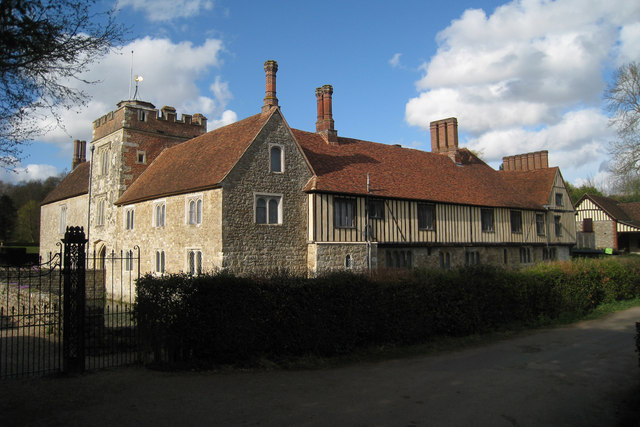
Ightham Mote, much developed by Richard Haute in the 15th century

The first wife of Nicholas was Alice Cawne, the widow of Richard Charlys (Charles) and daughter of Sir Thomas Cawne (or Couen), M.P. (d. 1374), and his wife Lora, daughter of Sir Thomas Moraunt of Chevening. Following the death of Alice's father Lora remarried to James de Pecham or Peckham of Yaldham manor, Wrotham, who took care to safeguard Alice's later affairs, especially her interests arising from her first marriage. By the marriage of Nicholas to Alice, Cawne's property of Ightham Mote, near Sevenoaks, Kent, passed into the Haute family. The descent of Alice, with many details of her family relationships, is shown in a suit of 1418 relating to the advowson of Warehorne church in Kent. Alice died on 11 March 1400, at which point her manor of Palster, "the denne of Palster" in Wittersham, Kent, representing one knight's fee held half from the king's castle of Leeds, Kent, and the other half from the archbishop of Canterbury by knight-service, passed by reversion to William Sneyth.

Nicholas married secondly Eleanor Flambard (d. 29 March 1422), daughter and heir of Edmund Flambard of Shepreth, Cambridgeshire, and widow of Walter Tyrrell, by whom she was the mother of Sir John Tyrrell, Speaker of the House of Commons.

== Service ==
The lands granted jointly by Nicholas and Edmund Haute to William Elys in March 1384/5 by indenture, reserving powers of entry for arrears of rent, in "Northynton", refer to an estate in Nackington, Lower Hardres, south of Canterbury. These were among the Haute hereditary lands. A writ of protection survives showing that Nicholas Haute was one of at least six knights who intended to travel on campaign in the baronial retinue of Richard Poynings, 3rd Baron Poynings, going to Spain in 1386. In 1395 Nicholas served as Member of Parliament for Kent, and in November 1395 received the King's appointment as High Sheriff of Kent and Keeper of Canterbury Castle, keeping his shrievalty at his manor and mansion of Wadenhall in Waltham. In 1396 he witnessed John de Cobham's grant of the charter of Cowling Castle and many other Kentish manors, including lands in Lower Hardres.

Haute received Commissions of array in Kent through the reign of Henry IV, commencing with the orders for December 1399-January 1400. He was a tax collector for Kent from 1404. He had a notable Commission of array in July 1405, "for the resistance of the king's enemies in France and others, at present assembled with no small force in the parts of Picardy, who propose to besiege and destroy the king's castles and towns in those parts and harm the king's lieges and to go to Wales to strengthen the rebels there." Again in May 1406 he was called upon to muster a force "for defence against the king's enemies of France and others, who intend shortly to invade the realm." His brother Edmund Haute served as Sheriff of Kent and Keeper of Canterbury Castle in 1408, but died in office in October 1408 and was replaced by William Sneyth.

Nicholas's benefactions include a grant to the church of the Domus Dei at Dover in July 1410, for a lamp burning daily before the high altar there. On 9 December of that year an important ceremony took place at Hoath in Kent, a dependency of Reculver. As it was inconvenient to carry bodies for burial to Reculver, Archbishop Thomas Arundel dedicated a chapel to the Virgin Mary and consecrated a churchyard at Hoath for the purpose, and immediately after the ceremony the inhabitants of Hoath, led by Sir Nicholas Haute, Peter Halle Esquire, and 'Dominus' Richard Hauk, chaplain of the chantry there, promised to fulfil the ordinances. The parish of Hoath includes Shelvingford and the site of Ford Palace, where this event was recorded on 20 January 1411. In November 1411 Haute, with others, who had acquired from the estate of Edmund Cokyn a garden adjacent to St Margaret's Canterbury, granted it to the master of the Hospital of Poor Chaplains at Canterbury (to which that church was annexed), for the enlargement of their burial-ground.

In 1415 Nicholas Haute and his son and heir William took part in Henry V's campaign in France. Nicholas was in the company of Humphrey, Duke of Gloucester (the king's brother) with three men-at-arms and nine archers. He may have died during the campaign or after his return, perhaps from wounds, but at any rate was no longer alive in April 1417 when William Haute inherited the family lands.

== Family ==
Sir Nicholas and Dame Alice had four sons:

- William Haute, son and heir (c. 1390–1462), of Bishopsbourne, Member of Parliament.
- Thomas Haute
- Edmund Haute
- Nicholas Haute (born by 1395)

Parliament of England
Preceded by William Pecche with John Cobham	Member of Parliament for Kent; 1395; With: Thomas Brockhill	Succeeded by Thomas Brockhill with Nicholas Potyn
