= Arnold Savage II =

English politician

Sir Arnold Savage II (ca. 1382 – 1420), of Bobbing, Kent, was an English politician.

== Family ==
His father, also named Arnold Savage, was Commons Speaker between 1400 and 1402. Around April 1399, the younger Savage married Katherine Scales (died 6 November 1436). Scales was the daughter of Roger de Scales, 4th Baron Scales, and Joan Northwood, daughter of John Northwood of Kent.

== Career ==
Savage was knighted before October 1414. He was a Member of Parliament for Kent in November 1414.

Parliament of England
Preceded by John Darell with Sir Thomas Clinton	Member of Parliament for Kent; 1414; With: Robert Clifford	Succeeded by ?
