= William Haute =

William Haute may refer to:

- William Hawte or Haute, composer
- William Haute (MP), English politician
