= John Cheyne (died 1467) =

English politician (1410–1467)

The Honourable Sir John Cheyne
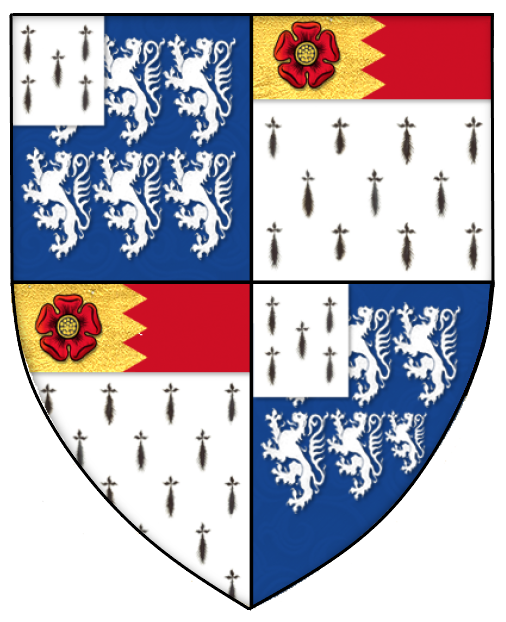
- Coat of arms of Sir John Cheyne: Quarterly — 1 and 4, Azure, six lioncels rampant Argent, a canton Ermine; 2 and 3, Ermine, a chief per pale indented Or and Gules, in the dexter side a rose of the last (Shottesbrooke)
- Born: 1410
- Died: 20 June 1467 (aged 56–57)
- Occupation: Politician
- Spouse: Eleanor Shottesbrooke (m. 1439)
- Children: Edmund Cheyne; William Cheyne; John Cheyne, Baron Cheyne; Edward Cheyne; Robert Cheyne; Roger Cheyne; Alexander Cheyne; Humphrey Cheyne; Edith Cheyne
- Parents: William Cheyne; Margaret de Shurland
- Family: Cheyne

Sir John Cheyne (1410 – 20 June 1467) of Eastchurch, Isle of Sheppey, was an English landowner and politician. By 1445 he was King's serjeant-at-arms and was knighted by 1447. He was elected MP for Kent in 1449. In 1452 he became Victualler of Calais, and was appointed sheriff of Kent in 1454.

== Family ==
He was born in 1410, the son and heir of William Cheyne (d. 1441) and Eleanor, daughter and heir of John Salerne of Iden, Sussex and his wife, Agnes.

In around 1439 he married Eleanor, daughter of Sir Robert Shottesbrooke of Faringdon, Berkshire, by whom he had at least eight sons and a daughter:

- Edmund Cheyne (died young)
- William Cheyne (d. 1487), married firstly, Isabel Boleyn, daughter of Sir Geoffrey Boleyn, by whom he had a son, Sir Francis Cheyne and secondly, Margaret Young, by whom he had a son, Sir Thomas Cheyne.
- John Cheyne, Baron Cheyne.
- Edward Cheyne (b. 1438), Dean of Salisbury, 1486–1502.
- Robert Cheyne
- Roger Cheyne, of Woodhay, Berkshire, married Anne, daughter of Richard Stanley of Lancashire.
  - John Cheyne
- Alexander Cheyne
- Humphrey Cheyne (died young)
- Edith Cheyne, married Sir William Sandys of The Vyne, with whom she had a son and a daughter:
  - William Sandys, 1st Baron Sandys
  - Edith Sandys (d. 1529), married, as his 2nd wife, Ralph Neville, Lord Neville (d. 1498), the son and heir of Ralph Neville, 3rd Earl of Westmorland She subsequently married, before 7 December 1499, as his 2nd wife, Thomas Darcy, 1st Baron Darcy de Darcy. She died at Stepney on 22 August 1529 and was buried at the Friars Observant, Greenwich.

== Career ==
Like the Cheynes before him he entered royal service and by April 1445 he was King's serjeant-at-arms. Cheyne was a justice of the peace for Kent from 28 December 1447 to 17 November 1460. By 1447 he had received a knighthood and was elected MP for Kent in February 1449. The following year he took part in Jack Cade's rebellion, for which he was pardoned. He was Victualler of Calais from 13 February 1452 to 1459, and served as sheriff of Kent from 1454 to 1455

He received pardons in 1452, 1455, 1458, and again with other Lancastrian officials in February 1462, when to the usual style "of Eastchurch" is added "of Wodehay, Berks." With Gervase Clifton, Treasurer of Calais, he accounted for expenditure on works at Calais from 1452 to 1457.

He died on 20 June 1467. His heir, William, according to the inquisition post mortem, was then aged 27.

== Bibliography ==
- Blaydes, Frederic Augustus (1884). The Visitations of Bedfordshire. Vol. 19. London: Harleian Society. p. 15.
- Herbert, Marcus (2011). "The Minster Yorkist: An Armoured Effigy in the Abbey Church of the Blessed Virgin Mary and St Sexburgha, Minster, Isle of Sheppey, Kent" (PDF). The Ricardian. 21: 1–22.
- Hyde, Patricia; Miller, Helen (1982). "Cheyne, Sir Thomas (1482/87-1558), of the Blackfriars, London and Shurland, Isle of Sheppey, Kent". In Bindoff, S.T. (ed.). The History of Parliament: the House of Commons 1509-1558 – via History of Parliament Online.
- Richardson, Douglas (2011). Everingham, Kimball G. (ed.). Magna Carta Ancestry: A Study in Colonial and Medieval Families. Vol. III (2nd ed.). CreateSpace. ISBN 978-1-4610-4520-5.
- Rylands, William Harry, ed. (1907). The Four Visitations of Berkshire Made and Taken by Thomas Benolte, Clarenceux, Anno 1532; by William Harvey, Clarenceux, Anno 1566; by Henry Chitting, Chester Herald, and John Philipott, Rouge Dragon, for William Camden, Clarenceux, Anno 1623; and by Elias Ashmole, Windsor Herald, for Sir Edward Bysshe, Clarenceux, Anno 1665-66. Vol. 1. Publications of the Harleian Society. Vol. 56. London: [Mitchell, Hughes and Clarke]. pp. 104–105. OCLC 556718842.
- Wedgwood, Josiah C.; Holt, Anne D. (1936). History of Parliament: Biographies of the Members of the Commons House, 1439-1509. London: His Majesty's Stationery Office. p. 181. OCLC 466732799.
- Woodger, L. S. (1993). "Cheyne, William (d.1441), of Shurland in Eastchurch, Isle of Sheppey, Kent.". In Roskell, J. S.; Clark, L.; Rawcliffe, C. (eds.). The History of Parliament: the House of Commons 1386-1421 – via History of Parliament Online.
