= Francis Cheyne =

English courtier (1481–1512)

Francis Cheyne KB
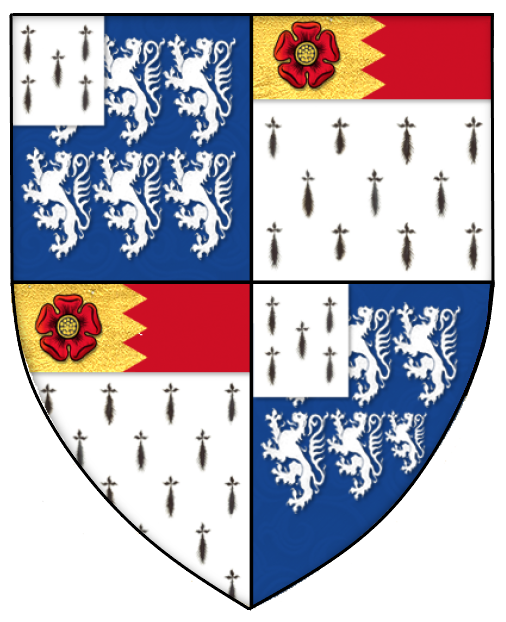
- Coat of arms of Sir Francis Cheyne: Quarterly — 1 and 4, Azure, six lioncels rampant Argent, a canton Ermine; 2 and 3, Ermine, a chief per pale indented Or and Gules, in the dexter side a rose of the last (Shottesbrooke)
- Born: 25 July 1481; Shurland Hall
- Died: 20 January 1512 (aged 30)
- Occupation: Courtier
- Spouse: Warberga Brereton (m. 1496)
- Parents: William Cheyne; Isabel Boleyn
- Relatives: Sir William Boleyn (uncle)
- Family: Cheyne

Sir Francis Cheyne (or Cheney) KB (25 July 1481 – 20 January 1512) of Shurland Hall, Isle of Sheppey, Kent, was an English landowner and courtier. He was an Esquire of the Body in the household of Henry VII and a Knight of the Body to Henry VIII. He was made a Knight of the Bath in 1509.

== Early life and family ==
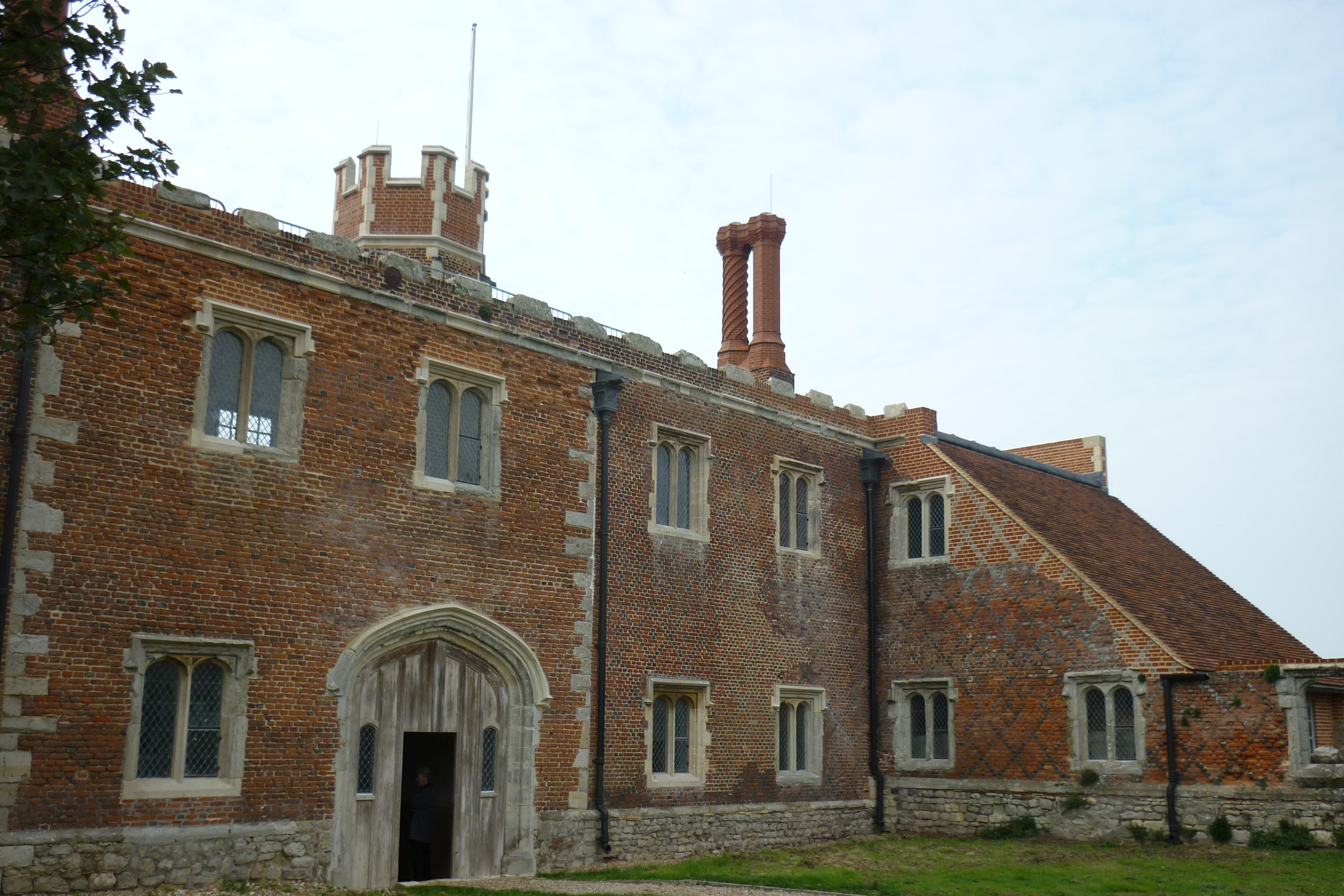
Shurland Hall near Eastchurch, Isle of Sheppey, Kent

He was born on 25 July 1481, the eldest son of William Cheyne (d. 8 May 1487) of Shurland Hall, Isle of Sheppey, Kent and his 1st wife, Isabel Boleyn (d. 23 April 1485), the daughter of Sir Geoffrey Boleyn and his 2nd wife, Anne Hoo.

William Cheyne was the eldest surviving son, and heir, of Sir John Cheyne of Sheppey, Kent and Eleanor, daughter of Sir Robert Shottesbrooke. When he died on 8 May 1487, his estates in Kent descended to Francis, his heir, who was then aged 5. Francis and his younger half-brother, Thomas, were then placed in the care of their uncle John, who took possession of the estates until his death on 30 May 1499.

In 1496 or 1497, at the age of 15, Francis married Werburga (1488–1525), the daughter of Sir John Brereton and Katherine Berkeley (d. 1494), daughter of Sir Maurice Berkeley and widow of John Stourton, 3rd Baron Stourton.

After John Cheyne had died childless in 1499 and his brother and heir Robert in 1503, Francis took possession of their lands in Berkshire and Kent which should by an earlier settlement have passed to John, the son of a younger brother, Roger.

In April 1501, Henry VII granted demise to Sir Richard Guldeford, comptroller of the household, Sir William Sandys, and Francis Cheyne, "to the use of the said Francis during his minority of the manors of Woodhey and Enborne, co. Berks, late of John Cheyne, knight, deceased, and in the king's hand by reason of the said minority; from Michaelmas last; so that they answer for the issues except 40 marks a year for the maintenance of the said Francis."

In March 1503, after Cheyne had reached the age of 21, a grant was made to Sir Reginald Bray, Sir William Sandys, Richard Empson and Francis Cheyne "of the keeping of the manors of Wodehey and Enborne, co. Berks, on the surrender of letters patent dated 18 [rectius 27] April, 16 Henry VII" by which the manors were demised to Sir Richard Guldeford, Sir William Sandys, and Francis Cheyne "to the use of the said Francis during his minority, with all the possessions and hereditaments of the late William Cheyne, esquire, father of the said Francis, and the late John Cheyne, knight, uncle of the said Francis: to hold and occupy the said manors and lands to the use of the said Francis as long as they shall remain in the king's hands, paying to the king for the next ten years the yearly sum of 100l. in satisfaction of 1,000l. for the marriage of the said Francis and the forfeiture thereof. Vacated as respects the yearly payment of 100l."

== Career ==
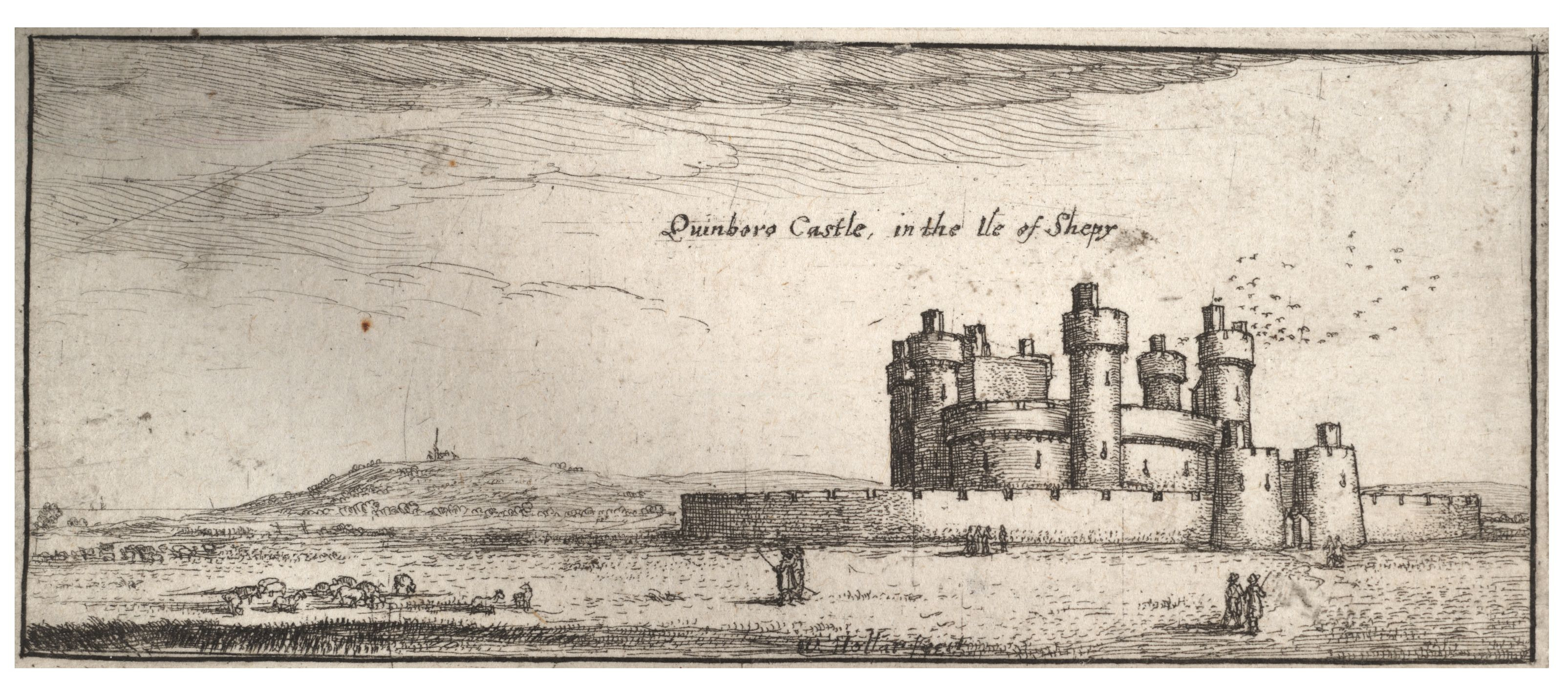
Queensborough Castle, by Wenceslaus Hollar

Holinshed's Chronicles stated that Thomas Cheyne was brought up in Henry VII's court as one of his henchmen. It seems reasonable to assume that the same was true of Francis. Both young men were esquires of the body in Henry VII's funeral procession.

In a grant dated 12 November 1506 "the king's servant, Francis Cheyne, esquire" was made Constable and porter of Queenborough Castle and steward of the lordship and manor of Middleton, and Merden and of the hundred of Middleton, Kent.

On the accession of Henry VIII in 1509 he was one of 26 men who were made Knights of the Bath:

[The King] has ordered 26 honorable persons to repair to the Tower of London on 22 June, to serve him at dinner, where those who are to be made knights shall bear dishes "in token that that they shall never bear none after that day"; and on 23 June, at the Tower, they are to be made Knights of the Bath

In the same year he was promoted to Knight for the Body, made Steward of the lordship or manor of Warblington, Hampshire and received a Pardon. He received another pardon in 1510 and was again made Constable and porter of the castle of Queenborough, Kent, and steward of the lordship or manor of Middleton and Merden, and the hundred of Middleton, Kent "with fees, from the first day of the reign, from the petty custom in the port of London; he having exercised the office from that time by the King’s mandate with no wages; on surrender of patent 5 Dec. last, because of its invalidity."

After the death of Henry VIII's son, Henry, Duke of Cornwall, on 22 February 1511, Cheyne was one of four Knights to bear banners at the lavish funeral and burial in Westminster Abbey. In July he received a Commission of Array for Hampshire and was given a grant, for life, of "the manor of Nusselyng Beauffeys, Hants, lately belonging to Sir William Stonour; with 18 acres of arable land called Stonyfeld, and 7 acres of meadow in Swathelyng, with rents from the villages of Milbroke (5s. 3d.) and Nusselyng (15d.) and from John Newman for his lands at Wymmeston called Peverell (7s.) forfeited by Edmund Dudley; and all other lands in the said places, and in Elyng and Rumsey, forfeited by the said Edmund."

In the same month, a force of around 1,500 men commanded by Sir Edward Poynings was sent to Guelders to support Margaret, Duchess of Savoy, who was under attack by the Duke of Guelders. Cheyne, who led a company of 200 men, had received a loan of 300l from the King which was to be repaid on his return to England. The army set sail a mile from Sandwich, Kent, on 18 July, landing at Armew on 19 July and returning to England on 25 November.

"And [at] Sir Edward Poynings' departure, the young duke made divers gentlemen of England knights, as Sir John Scott, Sir John Norton, Sir John Fogge, and Sir James Darell for our king sent the lorde Poynings, chief captain, with these 1500 hundred men, for to help the Duke of Burgundy against the Duke of Guelders. They all came back to Calais, and so over to England, the 25 of November. Sir Francis Cheyne, Sir John Dicky, Sir John Norton, Sir John Scott, Sir John Fogge, and Sir James Darell were the chief of that army."

An Indenture, dated 28 October 1511, with William Pawne, chief clerk of the Avery, who, by patent 23 August 1511, was appointed receiver of the lands assigned for payment of the garrison of Berwick, for his payments in that office, was recognised personally in Chancery on 14 December. Thomas lord Dacre and Sir Francis Cheyne were sureties.

In April 1512 Sir Charles Brandon, knight for the Body, replaced Sir Francis Cheyne, knight for the Body, deceased, as ranger of the New Forest.

== Death ==
He died without issue, at the age of 30, on 20 January 1512. His widow subsequently married, before 10 May 1512, the courtier, William Compton, of Compton Wynyates, Warwickshire. His heir, half-brother, Thomas, succeeded to their father's estates but failed to obtain possession of their uncles' lands, which in 1515 were finally given to his cousin, John Cheyne of West Woodhay, Berkshire.
