= Bettenham =

Bettenham is a surname. Notable people with the surname include:

- William Bettenham (fl. 1386–1400), English politician
- Stephen Bettenham, lawyer and landowner

== See also ==
- Bettenham Mill
