= William Nutbeam =

English politician

William Nutbeam, of Ash-next-Sandwich, Kent, was an English politician.

== Family ==
Nutbeam married, probably before 1398, Constance Ellis, daughter and coheiress of Thomas Ellis of Sandwich, Kent. They had one son.

== Career ==
Nutbeam was a justice of the peace for Kent from 1407 to 1416 and appointed High Sheriff of Kent for 1411–12. He was elected member of parliament for Kent in 1411.

Parliament of England
Preceded by ?	Member of Parliament for Kent; 1411; With: Reynold Pympe	Succeeded by ?
