= Henry Horne (MP) =

English politician

Henry Horne (fl. 1400 - 1434) was an English politician.

== Life ==
The Hornes were a prominent Kent family, around Horne's Place, near Appledore, Kent.

Horne had at least one son, the soldier and MP, Robert Horne, and a daughter, Joan Horne, who married William Haute.

== Career ==
Horne was Member of Parliament for Kent October 1404. He was appointed sheriff of Kent for 1406–1407. However, his name has been recorded as 'Michael'.

== Death ==
There is no definite record of Horne being alive after 1434.

Parliament of England
Preceded by Arnold Savage with Reynold Braybrooke	Member of Parliament for Kent; 1404; With: Thomas Clinton	Succeeded by Arnold Savage with Robert Clifford
