= William Cheyne =

William Cheyne may refer to:

- William Cheyne (died 1420) (c. 1374–1420), MP for Dorset (UK Parliament constituency)
- William Cheyne (15th century MP) for Kent
- William Cheyne (judge) (d. 1443), English Chief Justice, 1424–1438
- Sir William Cheyne, 1st Baronet (1852–1932), British surgeon and bacteriologist
- William Cheyne, 2nd Viscount Newhaven (1657–1728), MP for Amersham, Appleby and Buckinghamshire
- William Cheyne (footballer) (1912–1988), Scottish footballer for Rangers
