= John Butler (MP for Kent) =

14th to 15th-century English politician

John Butler I of Graveney, Kent, England, was an English politician.

Butler was appointed High Sheriff of Kent for 1398–1399 and was elected a Member of Parliament for Kent in May 1413.

Butler married, before June 1398, Joan Faversham (1376–1408), the third daughter of Richard Faversham of Graveney; she eventually inherited her father's estate. They had one daughter, Ann, who married John Martin.

Parliament of England
Preceded by ?	Member of Parliament for Kent; 1413; With: John Darell	Succeeded by John Darell with Sir Thomas Clinton
