= Burcester =

Burcester may refer to:

- Alternate version of Bicester
- William Burcester
