= William Hawte =

Sir William Hawte (also Haute or Haut) (c. 1430 – 2 July 1497) was a prominent member of a Kentish gentry family of long standing in royal service, which, through its near connections to the Woodville family, became closely and dangerously embroiled in the last phases of the Wars of the Roses.

It is claimed that he is the same Sir William Hawte who was a composer of liturgical and devotional choral music (who flourished c. 1460–1470), represented in a number of manuscript choirbooks that survive to this day. Two settings of the Benedicamus Domino are found in the Pepys Manuscript, and another work attributed to him, a Stella coeli, extirpavit (a Latin prayer to the Virgin, for protection from plague) exists in the Ritson Manuscript.

== Family ==
Hawte the composer is identified as a son of William Haute of Bishopsbourne, Kent, M.P., by his second wife, Joan Wydeville, daughter of Richard Wydeville, M.P. (1385–1441), of Grafton, Northamptonshire and Maidstone, Kent, who married c. 1429. William the father did have a child by his first wife, and there is mention of a young William Haute seeking a novitiate at Christ Church priory in Canterbury around 1430. However the weight of evidence is that Sir William was Joan Wydeville's son. He was therefore, by affinity and probably by blood, nephew of the 1st Earl Rivers and first cousin to Elizabeth Woodville, Queen Consort of King Edward IV.

== Young life and marriage ==
William therefore grew up, probably at Bishopsbourne, with an elder half-sibling and with three younger brothers and various sisters, one of whom, Alice, was by 1462 married to Sir John Fogge (as his second wife). William also was married before that date, and had a son of his own called William by his wife, Joan Horne (daughter of Henry Horne, M.P.), both of whom are mentioned in his father's will. Made in May 1462 and proved in October, this document is concerned mainly with the furnishings and chattels, the estates themselves having been disposed of by a testament now lost. Old William asked to be buried between his two wives before the image of St Katherine in the church of the Fraternity of St Augustine's, Canterbury. Among other things William inherited from his father the residue of his interesting collection of religious relics, after some of the choicer items had been allocated to selected recipients.

Both William and his father were included in commissions of array of December 1459 and 1460 to resist the rebellious adherents of Richard Earl of Warwick. William junior had already entered the service of Edward IV in 1461 when he was granted for life the office of Keeper of the King's Warren, near Sandwich, and soon afterwards received instructions to cause beacons to be set up along the Kentish coast to give warning of the approach of the king's enemies. He was created a knight at the queen's coronation on 26 May 1465, and rode before the queen's litter in the procession; in 1466–1467 he was for the first time High Sheriff of Kent (an office in which his father, his grandfather and his great-uncle had preceded him), and received the freedom of Canterbury in 1467.

== Sir William Haute and Richard Haute, Esq. ==
In 1470 Hawte's cousin Anthony Woodville, 2nd Earl Rivers, appointed William his attorney for entry into his Kentish estates. William's sister Anne was in the later 1460s and earlier 1470s engaged to marry Sir John Paston, but was released from the arrangement. William's brother Richard inherited some estates jointly with his brother by grant from their father, and in 1463 and 1468 released tenements in Canterbury to William. The full estates were finally granted among the brothers by their father's trustees in 1480, in tail, with mutual remainders. In the meantime Richard married Dame Elizabeth Darcy, widow of Sir Richard Darcy of Maldon and Danbury, and daughter of Sir Thomas Tyrrell of Heron, Essex, restoring the familial bond formed by his grandfather Nicholas Haute's second marriage. Like William Haute, Darcy was knighted at Elizabeth Woodville's coronation, but died in 1469 leaving a son Thomas aged 10.

Elizabeth remarried almost immediately to Richard Haute who held commissions for the peace for Worcestershire in 1472 and 1473 and for Shropshire, Gloucestershire and Herefordshire in May 1474. Richard was, from 1472 to 1475, Member of Parliament for Essex and from 1472 to 1480 held commission for the peace in that county. He was further Sheriff of Essex and Hertfordshire in 1474–1475. In the latter year Richard was granted the freedom of the city of Canterbury by birth, and represented it in parliament in 1478. He was appointed a justice in eyre of the queen's forests in 1477. By the partition indentures of 1480 Sir William received the old family manors of Bourne, Ford and Wadenhall, and the de Marinis lands of Otterpool, Blackmanstone and Elmsted, while Hastingleigh, Alderlose and Ightham Mote fell to Richard, their brother Edward taking the manor of Crofton, lands in Hougham near Dover and rents in Canterbury.

Through this period Sir William, the eldest brother, held a prominent position among the gentry of Kent. Although only two of his sons, William and Thomas, and a daughter Alice, reached maturity, there were besides four other sons and two daughters born in this time who appear to have died in their youth. He was a justice of the peace for Kent in 1461, 1462, 1464, 1465, 1467, 1469 and 1471–1475. With a commission of oyer and terminer to judge certain alleged traitors in 1463, in 1465 he was appointed to a commission against smugglers, and was reappointed in 1474 and 1475. Often in association with Sir John Fogge, Sir John Scott, Sir John Colepeper and Ralph St Leger the younger (who married Richard Haute's daughter Isabel), he took musters of soldiers in 1468, held commissions of array in 1469–1472, and mustered at Sandwich in the latter year.

He was (with Lord Rivers) commissioned to arrest rebels in 1471, to investigate fees owing to the king's progenitors in 1473, and to survey walls and ditches in 1474 and 1479. He made an important lease of his lands at Shelvingford in 1474, at much the same time that he received lands from his cousins, the daughters of his grandfather's nephew John Haute of Pluckley. His second term as Sheriff of Kent was in 1475–1476. In 1478, when the king granted him an annuity of 20 marks, he was appointed to conduct an inquest into the castles and lands of the Duke of Clarence. And in that year, 1478–79, Richard Haute of Ightham served as Sheriff of Kent.

== Towards revolt ==
Queen Elizabeth had appointed Richard Haute to be a tutor to her son Edward the Prince of Wales in 1472, a duty which took him to Ludlow Castle, and he became comptroller of the prince's household: but it is questioned whether this Richard was Sir William's brother, or their cousin the younger (Sir) Richard Haute, of Swerdling in Petham, Kent, (a descendant in a junior line from Sir Nicholas, William's grandfather), who was knighted in c. 1482. In 1478 one Richard Haute had distinguished himself in the tourneys at the marriage of Prince Richard, Duke of York to Anne Mowbray, and in 1481 Richard Haute the younger was made steward of the Gower lordship of that prince during his minority, and constable of Swansea Castle. Close association with the Wydevilles brought the Hautes into the sphere of the Duke of Gloucester's enmity.

In 1480 Sir William granted family manors and possessions in Canterbury to trustees for the purposes of a will, though none survives. Richard Haute of Ightham was again Sheriff of Kent in 1481–82, and from Michaelmas 1482 Sir William Haute was his immediate successor, in that year making a lease of lands in Waltham near the old Haute seat of Wadenhall. He was also holding a commission for walls and ditches. The story is attributed to Sir Thomas More, that "Sir" Richard Haute was with Anthony Woodville, 2nd Earl Rivers, Sir Richard Grey and Sir Thomas Vaughan bringing Prince Edward from Ludlow to London, when they were intercepted by the Duke of Gloucester and arrested at Stony Stratford; and that afterwards Haute was beheaded with the others, "and buryed naked in the monastery at Poumfret". (Woodville made Richard Haute Esq. an executor of his will.) But while this all appears clearly in Edward Hall's Chronicle, and Hawte may have been arrested, yet Richard Hawte is not named where the story appears in More's History of King Richard the Third, according to William Rastell's 1557 edition from More's manuscript. In fact both Richard Hautes, and also Sir William, survived the reign of Richard III.

When Richard III was proclaimed king on 22 June 1483, Sir William Haute was immediately removed from office as Sheriff of Kent and replaced with Sir Henry Ferrers. In Buckingham's rebellion, in the insurrection which occurred in Kent in the middle weeks of October 1483, Sir William was held by the December 1483 proclamation to be a ringleader, and was outlawed among the principals, with Sir John Guildford and Sir Thomas Lewknor, as being "the king's rebels and traitors, which imagined and utterly conspired the destruction of the king", yet is seemingly absent from the general act of attainder of January 1484, where instead the name of "Richard Haute, late of Ightham, squyer" appears prominently. This is certainly Richard the brother of Sir William, and his lands were seized and granted instead to his brother James Haute, who had not rebelled. Sir William, however, was able to perform a second lease of his lands in Shelvingford in 1484.

== Last years ==
Following the Battle of Bosworth Field, Richard Haute of Ightham was then included in the general act of restitution which was issued in the first year of King Henry VII. Anthony Woodville, awaiting execution, had made him an executor of his will, and Richard is also mentioned in the will of young Thomas Darcy his stepson, made 5 March 1483/4 and proved 16 June 1486. Richard of Ightham died in 1487, a writ for his inquisition being issued on 11 May and the inquest held on 14 November 1487: Edward Haute, aged 11 and more, was his son and heir, and Ightham Mote his inheritance. Richard left a will making Elizabeth Darcy (his widow) his executrix, but it is not recorded except from a pardon which she received in January 1488. It refers to Richard as "late Sheriff of Essex and Hertfordshire" and "late justice of sewers to Edward IV". Elizabeth's will was proved in January 1506/07.

Sir William's life of service was not yet concluded. He held commissions of the peace (Kent) and of gaol delivery (principally for Canterbury) from 1485 continuously through to 1493, and in that latter year granted a lease of a house in Canterbury. His cousin Sir Richard Haute died at the end of 1492, leaving his lands to his wife and little son Henry at Swerdling (in Petham), and providing that his mother Margaret should have convenient lodging there, with £5 rent to be paid at Warehorne: he left several riding horses to his servants, and "maister Thomas Haute" (perhaps Sir William's son) was among the witnesses. Sir Richard's widow was Katherine, daughter of Thomas Boston, whom he had married after the death in 1486 of her second husband John Green of Wicken Bonhunt, Essex. (Sir Richard's first wife Eleanor, daughter of Sir Robert Roos, had brought him Yorkshire manors forfeit by Thomas Roos.) Katherine Hawte died in the following year, and Sir William in 1495 made an agreement with Edward, his brother Richard's son, that Swerdling should be held to his use in tail. In 1505 Edward, who married Elizabeth Frognall, was a gentleman of Petham.

In 1496 Sir William was commissioned to participate in taking a muster of Kentish soldiers for the defence of Berwick against attack by the Scots. Sir William Hawte of Bishopsbourne died on 2 July in the 12th year of Henry VII (1497). His inquest, for which the writ was issued on 7 September 1499, showed that he died seised of the manors of Wadenhall, Bishopsbourne, Elmsted, Blakmanston, Otterpool, Warehorne and Snave, in fee. His elder son William having died before him, the next son Thomas Haute, then aged 33 and more, was his heir.

In 1512 Sir William's sister Dame Alice Fogg made a grant from lands at Ashford to provide for an Obit of 10s. 6d., at the anniversary of her husband, to pray for the souls of her husband, her own soul, for William Haute and Joan his wife, their children and all their friends.

== Literary interests ==
The literary interests of this family in this or the next generation are suggested by early ownership of the Middle English prose Merlin, derived from an Old French prose cycle of Arthurian literature. It is also remarked that the only surviving manuscript copy of the English version (attributed to Anthony Wydeville) of Christine de Pizan's Livre du corps de policie has an opening embellishment of the Haute family arms; and that a volume of French vulgate romances in the British Library (from the English Royal Library), including Estoire del Saint Graal, La Queste del Saint Graal, and Morte Artu, belonged to Sir Richard Roos ("my grete book called Saint Grall bounde in boordes covers with rede leder and with plates of laton"), who in 1482 bequeathed it to his niece Eleanor Haute (née Roos), the first wife of Sir Richard Haute. It was apparently afterwards given to Elizabeth Wydeville.

Related interest attaches to the books of John Goodere the elder (whose grandson Thomas married William Hawte's granddaughter Joan), who possessed print copies of Dives et Pauper and Knight of the Tower (presumably William Caxton's), a parchment Canterbury Tales, 'an old boke of the cronycls of yngeland', 'an olde boke of Bonuauentur' (more likely pseudo-Bonaventure), and 'a queyr of phisik of the secrets of women' (De Secretis Mulierum, of pseudo-Albertus Magnus).

== Children ==
Sir William and Dame Joan were the parents of:

- Alicia Hawte, who married Sir William Crowmer
- William Hawte, who died before his father.
- Thomas Hawte (c.1464-28 November 1502), who married Elizabeth (Isabella), sister of the distinguished judge Sir Thomas Frowyk. He was thus uncle to Frideswyde Frowyk, wife of Sir Thomas Cheyne. He was made Knight of the Bath in November 1501 at the marriage of Arthur, Prince of Wales to Catherine of Aragon. The inquisition post mortem of Sir Thomas Haute, which is lost, was held in the 18th year of King Henry VII (1502/03). A Chancery suit (brought by Isabella) of May 1517 to January 1517/18 shows that Thomas and Isabella had two sons (William and Herry) and five daughters (Jane, Margery, Agnes, Elizabeth and Alice), and supplies other useful information.
  - Their son (Sir) William Hawte of Bishopsbourne (c. 1489–1539), whose wardship was granted to Sir Henry Frowyk in 1503, married Mary Guildford (daughter of Sir Richard Guildford, and relict of Christopher Kempe), and was by her father of Jane Haute, the wife of Sir Thomas Wyatt the Younger. William remarried to Margaret, daughter of Oliver Wood.
  - Their daughter Joan Hawte married (1) Thomas Goodere of Monken Hadley, Middlesex (died 1518): they have monumental brasses there. Their children included Francis Goodere, M.P., and Alice, wife of Sir George Penruddock of Ivychurch. Joan Hawte married (2) Robert Wroth of Enfield, by whom she was mother of Sir Thomas Wroth and mother-in-law of Edward Lewknor (died 1556).

The following children probably died in youth:

- John Haute
- Robert Haute
- James Haute
- Richard Haute
- Joan Haute
- Cecily Haute
