= Thomas Town =

English fifteenth century politician

Thomas Town of Town Place in Throwley, Kent, was an English politician.

== Family ==
Town was the son and heir of Thomas atte Town, who died in 1403, by Bennet Detling, daughter and heiress of John Detling of Detling, Kent, who was also known as John Brampton. Thomas Town married Joan Cheyne, daughter of William Cheyne of Eastchurch, Isle of Sheppey, Kent. They had three daughters.

== Career ==
Town was a Member of Parliament for Kent constituency in 1420.
