= Richard Wydeville (died 1441) =

English soldier, politician, administrator from Northamptonshire (d. c. 1441)

Richard Woodville
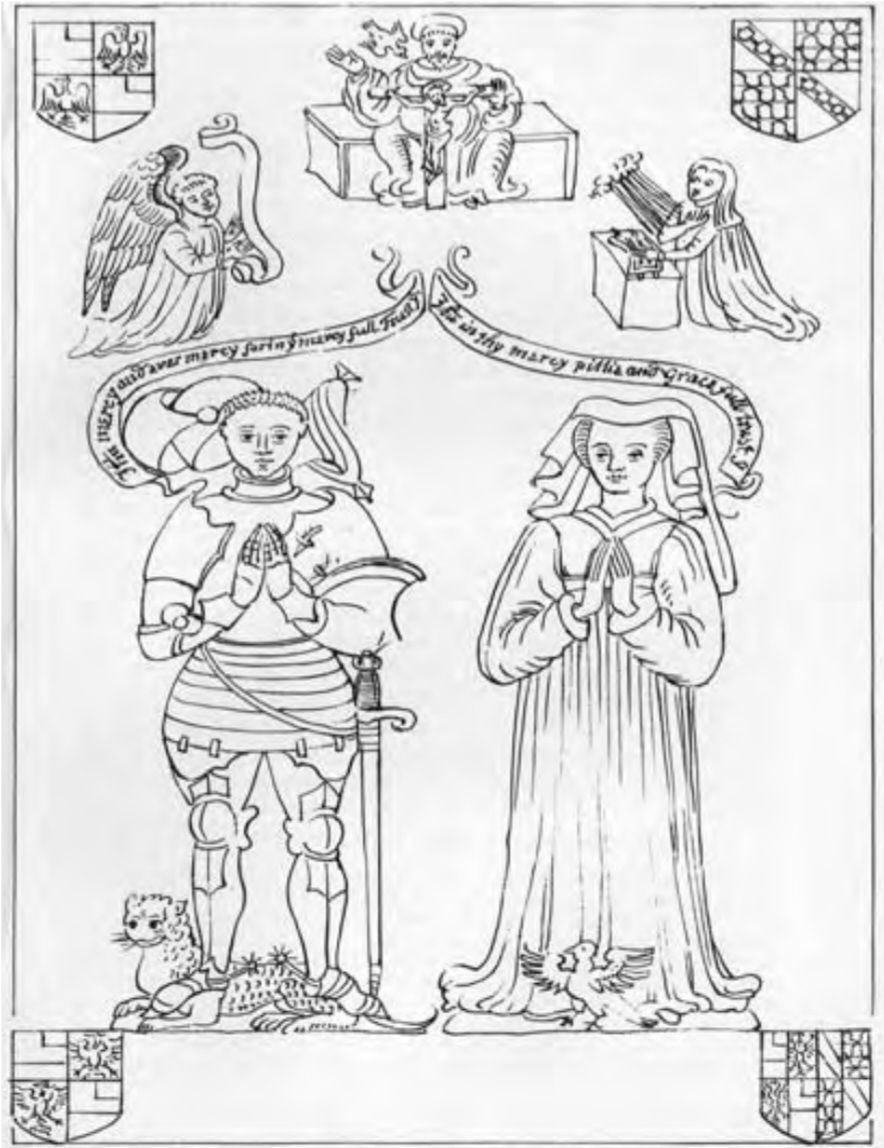
- Memorial brass of Sir Richard Woodville, and his wife.
- Born: 1375
- Died: 1441 (aged 65–66)
- Spouse: Joan Bedlisgate
- Issue: Richard Woodville, 1st Earl Rivers; Joan Woodville
- Father: John de Wydeville of Grafton
- Mother: Isabel Goddard

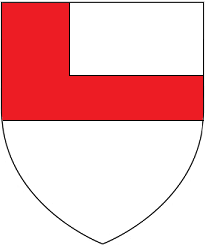
Arms of Woodville: Argent, a fesse and a canton conjoined gules

Richard Wydeville (also written contemporaneously as Wydville and Woodville) (died 1441) was an English landowner, soldier, diplomat, administrator and politician. His son married an aunt of King Henry VI and they were the parents of the wife of the next king, Edward IV.

== Origins ==
He was the younger son of John Wydeville (died before 1401), a Northamptonshire landowner with a long career as administrator and politician, and his second wife Isabel, widow of Robert Passelow, of Drayton Parslow. The heir to the family lands was his elder brother from his father's first marriage, Thomas Wydeville (died about 1435), who followed his father as an administrator and politician.

From at least 1268, the Wydeville family had been tenants in the village of Grafton Regis, where they occupied the manor house next to the church, and had acquired lands in neighbouring parishes. According to Hasted, it was John Wydeville who acquired the manor of Mote at Maidstone in Kent, which eventually came to Richard.

== Career ==
By 1411 he was serving in France in the garrison of Guînes, then part of the English territory of the Pale of Calais, under the Duke of Clarence, King Henry V's brother. In 1415 and 1417, he was a captain in Henry Vs forces fighting in France, later coming under the command of another brother of the King, the Duke of Bedford.

In 1419 and 1420 he was granted various domains, lordships and bailiwicks in Normandy, culminating in 1421 with appointment as Seneschal of the province of Normandy. In 1423 he was Chamberlain to the Duke of Bedford, Treasurer of Normandy, and Captain of the city of Caen. After disturbances in London in 1425, he was ordered there to safeguard the Tower, followed in 1426 by being one of a mission sent to negotiate with Philip III, Duke of Burgundy. In that year, his son Richard was knighted by the Duke of Bedford. In 1427 he was made Lieutenant of Calais, and in 1431 was appointed to safeguard the young king Henry VI while in France.

In 1433 he was elected Member of Parliament for Kent, and was named a justice of the peace for the county. In the spring of 1434 he attended the meeting of the Great Council at Westminster, during which the Duke of Bedford and his brother Humphrey, Duke of Gloucester fell out over the handling of the English war effort in France, following which he was called back to active service there. While he was a member of the council, his son Richard would have met the Duke of Bedford's French wife Jacquetta, whom he married after the Duke's death.

In 1435 he was made Lieutenant of Calais again, and was named as chief commissioner to negotiate for England with the Duchy of Burgundy, the Teutonic Order and the Hanse. In that year his brother Thomas died without children and left nearly everything to his sisters Elizabeth and Agnes, apart from the ancestral manor of Grafton which went to Richard. He disputed the will, and legal argument went on for the rest of his life.

In 1437 he was appointed Constable of Rochester Castle, but later that year was chosen as sheriff of Northamptonshire, where he also served on a commission in 1439.

He made his will on 29 November 1441 and died shortly after, being buried at Maidstone. Despite his career of public service and his close connections to the royal family, he was never knighted.

== Family ==
His wife was Joan, daughter of Thomas (or John) Bedlisgate, of Knightstone in the parish of Ottery St Mary in Devon, and his wife Joan Beauchamp. He had two known children:

- Richard (died 1469), who married Jacquetta of Luxembourg, widow of the John of Lancaster, Duke of Bedford, and was created Earl Rivers. Their daughter Elizabeth Woodville was the Queen Consort of King Edward IV, becoming the ancestor of all ruling monarchs of England from 1509 on and of Scotland from 1513 on.
- Joan (died 1462), who married the Kent MP William Haute, of Bishopsbourne. She is a great great-grandmother of Katherine Parr, the sixth, and final, wife of King Henry VIII.

His widow died some time after 17 July 1448, when she had property in Ireland, and was probably buried at Maidstone.
