= Roger Rye =

English politician

Roger Rye (died 1425), of Canterbury and Eythorne, near Dover, Kent, was an English politician.

== Family ==
Before June 1414, he married a woman named Margery. He is thought to have come originally from Dover.

== Career ==
Rye was a Member of Parliament for Kent in 1417.
