= Henry Redford =

Member of the Parliament of England

Coat of arms of Henry Redford
Escutcheon Argent fretty Sable a chief of the second.

Sir Henry Redford or Retford (c. 1354 – c. 1409) was a Knight of the Shire, Sheriff of Lincolnshire and the Speaker of the House of Commons.

In 1384 he served on a number of royal commissions and was knighted.

After serving with Richard II on an ill-fated Scottish campaign in 1385 he accompanied John of Gaunt in 1386 on his expedition to Spain. In 1389, 1392 and 1397 he served as High Sheriff of Lincolnshire and represented Lincolnshire in parliament as Knight of the Shire for 1400, and in 1401 was summoned to the privy council.

In 1402 he again represented Lincolnshire in the parliament that met on 1 Oct 1402 and two days later he was elected speaker. The parliament was held at Coventry before moving to Westminster (due to problems with lodgings and food), with the Lord Chancellor asking for:

Ways and means for maintaining the war against Scotland, for utterly subjecting the enemies of Wales, for wholly conquering Ireland and for defending Guienne, Calais and the Marches thereof.

Alarmed at the scale of the request, Parliament took several days to consider it, but found they couldn't come to any conclusion. On 10 October they asked permission to confer with members of the House of Lords, which the King granted under duress. As a result, 4 Bishops, 4 Earls and 4 Barons were ordered to attend, and the end decision was a three-shilling tax on wine and a 15 pence tax on merchandise to sponsor the King's efforts. It is reported that Henry was so pleased with the result that he invited both houses to dine with him privately.

In 1403 Redford was again attending meetings of the privy council, and in 1404 once more represented Lincolnshire in parliament and served as sheriff of the county for the fourth and last time in 1406.

He died around 1409. He had married by Easter 1385, Katherine, widow of Sir Ralph Paynell of Caythorpe and Carlton Paynell; they had one son, Henry, who succeeded him and was later attained for treason as a Yorkist.

Political offices
Preceded by Arnold Savage	Speaker of the House of Commons; 1402	Succeeded by Arnold Savage
