= Roger Honyton =

English politician

Roger Honyton, of Goudhurst, Kent and Little Horsted, Sussex, was an English politician.

== Family ==
Honyton was married three times. Before June 1407, he married Joan, daughter and coheiress of John Mayhew of Ashford, Kent. He married again, before November 1423, a woman named Alice. They had two sons. His third wife was named Joan.

== Career ==
Honyton was a member of parliament for Kent constituency in December 1421.
