= John Cheyne, Baron Cheyne =

English royal bodyguard and official (c. 1442–1499)

The Right Honourable John Cheyne PC KG
- Baron Cheyne
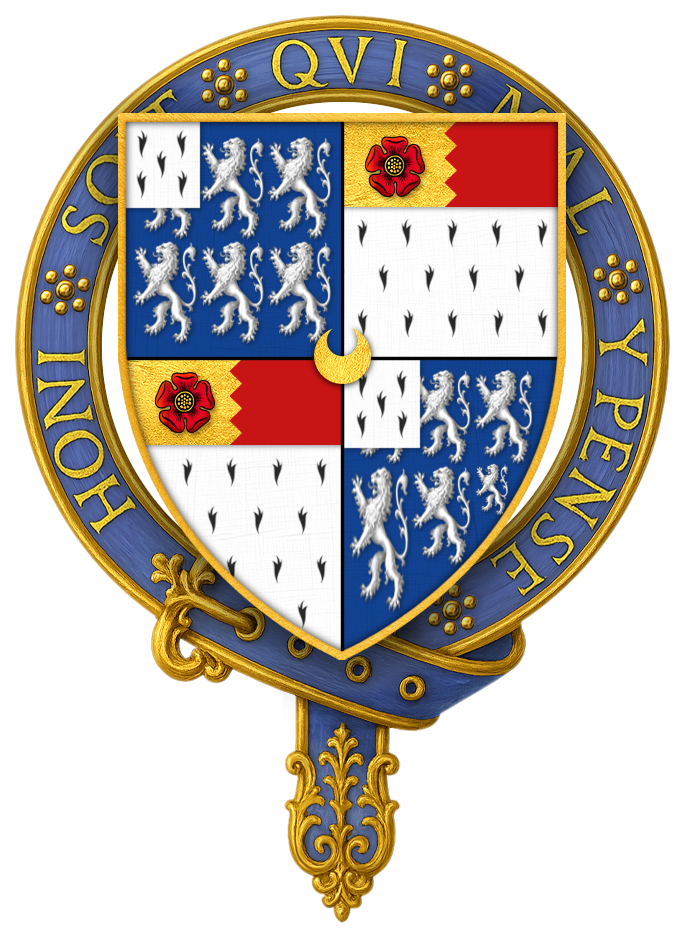
- Coat of arms
- Reign: Henry VII
- Born: c. 1442; Shurland Hall
- Died: 30 May 1499 (aged 56–57)
- Buried: Salisbury Cathedral
- Noble family: Cheyne
- Spouse: Margaret Chidiock (m. 1479)
- Father: Sir John Cheyne
- Mother: Eleanor Shottesbrooke
- Occupation: Courtier

John Cheyne, Baron Cheyne (c. 1442 – 30 May 1499) was Master of the Horse to King Edward IV of England and personal bodyguard to King Henry VII of England.

== Biography ==
John was the third but second surviving son of Sir John Cheyne (d. 1467) of Shurland Hall in Kent, by his wife, Eleanor, daughter and sole heiress of Sir Robert Shottesbrooke of Faringdon in Berkshire (now Oxfordshire). He was the uncle of Thomas Cheyne, Lord Warden of the Cinque Ports and grand-uncle of Tudor soldier and MP John Cheyne (d. 1567).

In the 1460s he was appointed Esquire of the body to Elizabeth Woodville, Queen of Edward IV. He was MP for Wiltshire in 1478, and in 1479 was appointed Master of the Horse. In the same year he married Margaret Chidiock, eldest daughter of Sir John Chidiock, and widow of William Stourton, 2nd Baron Stourton.

He was present when the Treaty of Picquigny was signed in 1475, and remained behind as a hostage of King Louis XI of France until King Edward IV had gone back to Calais and thence to England. Also in that year, he was granted the manor of Faulstone near Salisbury (now in Bishopstone parish) which had been confiscated from Sir Robert Baynton for his support of Henry VI.

After the death of Edward, and the seizure of the crown by Richard III, Cheyne switched sides to support Henry Tudor's claim to the throne, joining him in exile in Brittany. Henry knighted him on 7 August 1485, at Milford Haven, on their return to England. He fought in 1485 at the Battle of Bosworth Field. When Richard III launched his last charge directly at Henry, Cheyne was part of Henry's personal bodyguard. Richard unhorsed him with a blow from his broken lance. He fought again at the Battle of Stoke in 1487. In 1486 he was made a Knight of the Garter and was called to parliament as Baron Cheyne. By April 1497 he was a member of the Privy Council.

In later life he lived at Enborne in Berkshire. Nicknamed the "Vigorous Knight" by contemporaries, he was a massive man of redoubtable strength. A 21" thighbone, found in his tomb in Salisbury Cathedral in the 18th century, puts his estimated height at 6 feet 8 inches.

== Death ==
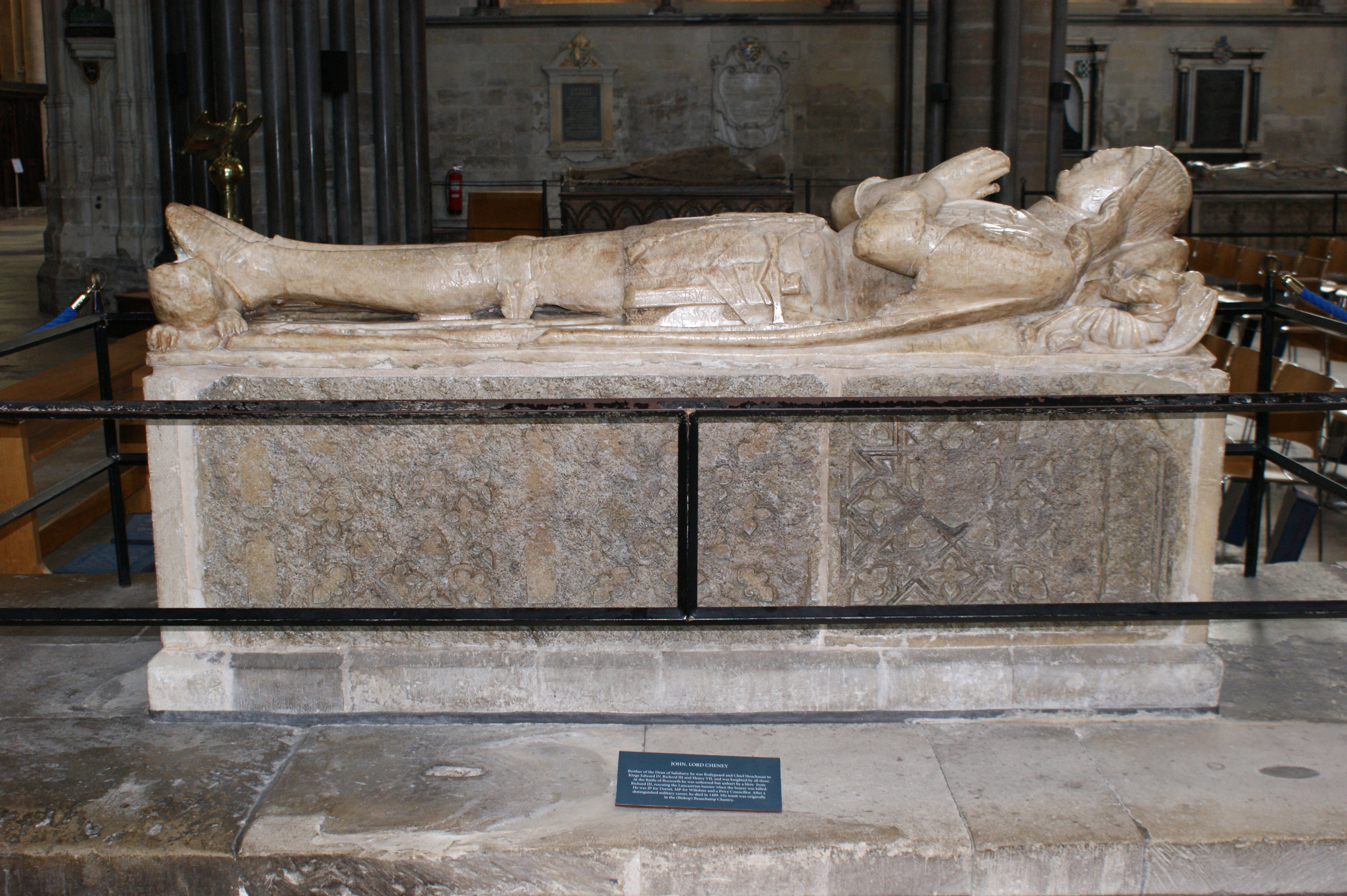
Tomb of John Cheyne, Baron Cheyne in Salisbury Cathedral

He died without issue on 30 May 1499 and was buried in Salisbury Cathedral. On his death the Barony became extinct and his estates passed to his elder brother William's son, Francis. His widow died on 12 March 1503 at the age of 30.
