= Kent (constituency) =

Former parliamentary constituency in the United Kingdom

- Former county constituency for the House of Commons

1290–1832
- Seats: Two
- Replaced by: Eastern Kent, Western Kent and Greenwich

Kent was a parliamentary constituency covering the county of Kent in southeast England. It returned two "knights of the shire" (Members of Parliament) to the House of Commons by the bloc vote system from the year 1290. Members were returned to the Parliament of England until the Union with Scotland created the Parliament of Great Britain in 1707, and to the Parliament of the United Kingdom after the union with Ireland in 1801 until the county was divided by the Reform Act 1832.

== History ==
=== Boundaries ===
The constituency consisted of the historic county of Kent. (Although Kent contained eight boroughs, each of which elected two MPs in its own right for part of the period when Kent was a constituency, these were not excluded from the county constituency, and the ownership of property within the borough could confer a vote at the county election. This was even the case for the city of Canterbury, which had the status of a county in itself: unlike those in almost all other counties of cities, Canterbury's freeholders were entitled to vote for Kent's MPs.)

The constituency boundaries may have theoretically encompassed a much larger area and population than would at first appear. After the American Revolution, it was apparently solemnly argued in Parliament that the rebels' complaint of no taxation without representation was mistaken, since "all the grants of land in America were to be held of the Manor of Greenwich in the County of Kent, and therefore the Knights of the Shire for the County of Kent represented all Americans". However, this somewhat flimsy argument - relying on an obsolete legal fiction dating back to the land ownership laws of the feudal system - seems not to have been received entirely respectfully even in the 18th century, and it is certainly not recorded that Kent's returning officer was ever bothered by American colonists demanding their right to vote.

=== Franchise ===
In medieval times, the custom in Kent, as elsewhere, was for the MPs for the county and those for its boroughs to be elected on the same day at the county court, by the suitors to the court, which meant the tiny handful of the local nobility who were tenants in chief of the Crown. Thus we find it recorded that in the second year of the reign of Henry V, "In the County Court of Kent, held at Rochester, Four Coroners and Eight others present, chose the Knights for the County, and the same person elect two Citizens for Canterbury, and two for Rochester."

From 1430, the Forty Shilling Freeholder Act extended the right to vote to every man who possessed freehold property within the county valued at £2 or more per year for the purposes of land tax; it was not necessary for the freeholder to occupy his land, nor even in later years to be resident in the county at all.

Except during the period of the Commonwealth in the mid 17th century, Kent had two MPs elected by the bloc vote method, under which each voter had two votes. In the nominated Barebones Parliament, five members represented Kent. In the First and Second Parliaments of Oliver Cromwell's Protectorate, however, there was a general redistribution of seats and Kent elected 11 members, though most of the county's boroughs lost one or both of their MPs. The traditional arrangements were restored from 1659.

=== Political character ===
At the time of the Great Reform Act in 1832, Kent had a population of approximately 480,000, though only between 8,000 and 9,000 of these were qualified to vote at the start of the 19th century, and fewer than 4,000 actually voted at the last contested election, in 1818. It has been estimated that in this period around a third of Kent's voters were urban, spread among a couple of dozen medium-sized and small towns: Canterbury, Maidstone, Dover, Deal, Chatham and the growing resorts of Ramsgate and Margate were the biggest, but at the election of 1802 the pollbooks show that only Canterbury (with 384 voters) contributed more than 250 to the poll.

With the villages outvoting the towns by two to one, no particular local interest predominated. By custom, the choice was generally one member from East Kent and one from West Kent. The county's MPs were generally drawn from the leading local families of gentry, but rarely from the nobility, and the voters jealously guarded their independence: although important peers wielded significant influence at times - the Earl of Westmorland and Earl of Winchelsea at the turn of the 18th century for example, the Duke of Dorset sixty years later - it always fell far short of control over the outcome.

Elections were held at a single polling place, and voters from the rest of the county had to travel to the county town to exercise their franchise. It was normal for voters to expect the candidates for whom they voted to meet their expenses in travelling to the poll, making the cost of fighting an election substantial. Contested elections were therefore rare in most counties, but Kent was something of an exception: voters went to the polls at 14 of the 29 general elections between 1700 and 1832, a total exceeded only by Surrey among the other English counties.

Those elections which were contested seem rarely to have been decided on party lines, and too great an adherence to party loyalty by the MPs was sometimes resented. The voters also expected the solicitous attention of their members. Jupp reprints the resolutions passed by a County meeting of Kent freeholders in 1820:

1. That it is essential to the honour and credit of this County, that it should be represented by two gentlemen constantly resident therein.
2. That it is the opinion of this Meeting that this county was in the last Parliament very inefficiently represented by one of its members, inasmuch as his residence was elsewhere, and the Freeholders were thereby deprived of that easy access and free communication which are essential between the constituent and the representative.
3. That it is the opinion of this meeting that the conduct of a County member in Parliament should be at all times marked by independence, equally free from subserviency to any Administration and unshackled by any Party indiscriminately hostile thereto.
4. That we cannot recognise in Mr Honywood's uniform opposition to every measure recently proposed in Parliament, for the purpose of restraining the career of sedition, blasphemy and crime, the influence of that elevated spirit, which should direct the actions of an independent representative for this great and enlightened County.

These sentiments were clearly not held universally, however, since the apostrophised Mr Honywood was re-elected at that year's election.

=== Abolition ===
The constituency was abolished in 1832 by the Great Reform Act, being divided into two two-member county divisions, Eastern Kent and Western Kent.

== Members of Parliament ==
=== MPs 1290–1660 ===
- Constituency created (1290)

Parliament	First member	Second member
1372	James Peckham	
1376–1388	Sir Thomas Fogge	
1377 (Oct)	James Peckham	John Freningham
1378	Sir Thomas Fogge	
1380 (Nov)	Sir Thomas Fogge	William Guildford
1381	John Freningham	Sir Thomas Fogge
1383 (Feb)	James Peckham	Sir Thomas Fogge
1383 (Oct)	Sir Thomas Fogge	
1384 (Nov)	Sir Thomas Fogge	William Guildford
1386	William Bettenham	Geoffrey Chaucer
1388 (Feb)	Sir Thomas Fogge	James Peckham
1388 (Sep)	William Bettenham	James Peckham
1390 (Jan)	Sir Arnold Savage	John Cobham
1390 (Nov)	Sir Arnold Savage	Sir Thomas Cobham
1391	Sir Arnold Savage	Nicholas Potyn
1393	Sir William Burcester	Nicholas Potyn
1394	Sir William Pecche	John Cobham
1395	Sir Nicholas Haute	Thomas Brockhill
1397 (Jan)	Nicholas Potyn	Thomas Brockhill
1397 (Sep)	Sir William Pecche	John Cobham
1399	John Freningham	Thomas Brockhill
1401	Sir Arnold Savage	Robert Clifford
1402	Sir Arnold Savage	Thomas Brockhill
1404 (Jan)	Sir Arnold Savage	Sir Reynold Braybrooke
1404 (Oct)	Sir Thomas Clinton	Henry Horne
1406	Richard Clitheroe	Robert Clifford
1407	Richard Clitheroe	John Darell
1410	returns lost	
1411	Reynold Pympe	William Nutbeam
1413 (Feb)	returns lost	
1413 (May)	John Darell	John Butler I
1414 (Apr)	John Darell	Sir Thomas Clinton
1414 (Nov)	Sir Arnold Savage II	Robert Clifford
1415	returns lost	
1416 (Mar)	William Cheyne	John Wilcotes
1416 (Oct)	returns lost	
1417	John Darell	Roger Rye
1419	William Haute	Edward Guildford
1420	William Rickhill	Thomas Town
1421 (May)	returns lost	
1421 (Dec)	Thomas Ellis	Roger Honyton
1422	Geoffrey Lowther	Reginald Lowther
1426	Edward Guildford	
1430	William Scott	
1435	Edward Guildford	
1445–1446	Thomas Browne	
1449	John Cheyne	
1450	William Haute	
1455	Gervase Clifton	Sir Thomas Kyriell
1461–1462	Sir John Fogge	Sir Thomas Kyriell
1463–1465	Sir John Fogge	
1467	Sir John Scott	
1478	Sir John Fogge	
1483	Sir John Fogge	
1489-1495	Sir Richard Guildford (3 times)	
1510	No names known	
1512	?Sir Edward Poynings	?
1515	?Sir Thomas Nevill	?
1523	?	
1529	Sir Edward Guildford, died and replaced Oct 1534 by Sir John Dudley	Sir Henry Guildford
1536	?Thomas Cromwell	?
1539	Sir Thomas Cheyne	Gregory Cromwell
1542	Sir Thomas Cheyne	Sir Thomas Wyatt, died and replaced Jan 1543 by Sir John Guildford
1545	Sir Thomas Cheyne	George Harper
1547	Sir Thomas Cheyne	Sir Thomas Wyatt II
1553 (Mar)	Sir Thomas Cheyne	Sir Henry Sidney
1553 (Oct)	Sir Thomas Cheyne	Sir Robert Southwell
1554 (Apr)	Sir Thomas Cheyne	Sir John Baker
1554 (Nov)	Sir Thomas Cheyne	Sir John Baker
1555	Sir John Baker	Sir Robert Southwell
1558	Sir Thomas Cheyne	Sir John Baker
1558–9	Sir Anthony St. Leger I	Sir Richard Sackville, sat for Sussex, repl. Feb 1559 by Sir Thomas Kempe
1562–3	Sir Henry Sidney	Sir Henry Cheyne
1571	Sir Thomas Scott	Sir Henry Sidney
1572	Sir Henry Sidney	Sir Thomas Scott
1584 (Nov)	Sir Philip Sidney	Edward Wotton
1586 (Oct)	Sir Henry Brooke alias Cobham I	Sir Thomas Scott
1588 (Oct)	Henry Brooke alias Cobham II	Sir Henry Brooke alias Cobham I
1593	Sir Edward Hoby	Moyle Finch
1597 (Sep)	Sir Robert Sidney	Sir William Brooke alias Cobham, killed in duel and replaced Jan 1598 by Percival Hart
1601	Francis Fane	Sir Henry Nevill
Parliament of 1604-1611	Sir John Scott	John Leveson
Addled Parliament (1614)	Sir Peter Manwood	Sir Thomas Walsingham
Parliament of 1621-1622	Viscount Lisle	Sir George Fane
Happy Parliament (1624–1625)	Nicholas Tufton	Sir Edwin Sandys
Useless Parliament (1625)	Mildmay Fane	Sir Albertus Morton
Parliament of 1625-1626	Sir Edward Hales	Sir Edward Scott
Parliament of 1628-1629	Thomas Finch	Sir Dudley Digges
No Parliament summoned 1629-1640

=== MPs 1640–1832 ===
Year	First member	First party	Second member	Second party
April 1640	Norton Knatchbull		Sir Roger Twysden	
November 1640	Sir John Colepeper	Royalist	Sir Edward Dering	Royalist
1642	Sir John Colepeper	Royalist	Augustine Skinner	
January 1644	Colepeper disabled from sitting - seat vacant		Augustine Skinner	
1645	John Boys		Augustine Skinner	
December 1648	Boys excluded in Pride's Purge - seat vacant		Augustine Skinner	
1653	Kent had five members in the Barebones Parliament: Viscount Lisle, Thomas Blount, William Kenrick, William Cullen, Andrew Broughton			
1654	Kent had 11 members in the First Protectorate Parliament: Lieutenant Colonel Henry Oxenden, William James, Colonel John Dixwell, John Boys, Sir Henry Vane (senior), Lambert Godfrey, Colonel Richard Beal, Augustine Skinner, John Selliard, Colonel Ralph Weldon, Daniel Shatterden			
1656	Kent had 11 members in the Second Protectorate Parliament: Henry Oxenden, Richard Meredith, Sir Thomas Style, William James, Colonel John Dixwell, John Boys, Lambert Godfrey, Colonel Richard Beal, John Selliard, Colonel Ralph Weldon, Daniel Shatterden			
January 1659	Sir Thomas Style		William James	
May 1659	Augustine Skinner		One seat vacant	
April 1660	Sir Edward Dering		Sir John Tufton	
1661	Sir Thomas Peyton		Sir John Tufton	
1679	Sir Vere Fane		(Sir) Edward Dering	
1685	Sir William Twysden		Sir John Knatchbull	
1689	Sir Vere Fane		Sir John Knatchbull	
1691	Sir Thomas Roberts		Sir John Knatchbull	
1695	Sir Thomas Roberts		Philip Sydney	
1698	Sir James Oxenden		Sir Stephen Lennard	
January 1701	Sir Thomas Hales		Thomas Meredith	
December 1701	Sir Thomas Hales		William Campion	
1702	Sir Thomas Hales		Sir Francis Leigh	
1705	Sir Cholmeley Dering, Bt	Tory	Viscount Villiers	
1708	Sir Thomas Palmer		Sir Stephen Lennard, Bt	
January 1710 by-election	Sir Thomas Palmer		David Polhill	
October 1710	Sir Cholmeley Dering, Bt	Tory	Percival Hart	
1711 by-election	Sir William Hardres		Percival Hart	
1713	Sir Edward Knatchbull, 4th Bt		Percival Hart	
February 1715	Mildmay Fane		William Delaune	
September 1715 by-election	Colonel the Hon. John Fane		William Delaune	
1722	Sir Edward Knatchbull, 4th Bt		Sir Thomas Twisden	Tory
1727	Sir Roger Meredith		Sir Robert Furnese	Whig
1733 by-election	Sir Roger Meredith		Sir Edward Dering	Tory
1734	The Viscount Vane		Sir Edward Dering	Tory
1735 by-election	Sir Christopher Powell	Whig	Sir Edward Dering	Tory
1741	Sir Roger Twisden	Tory	Sir Edward Dering	Tory
1754	Hon. Lewis Watson	Whig	Hon. Robert Fairfax	
1760 by-election	Sir Wyndham Knatchbull-Wyndham, 6th Bt	Whig	Hon. Robert Fairfax	
1763 by-election	Sir Brook Bridges	Whig	Hon. Robert Fairfax	
1768	Sir Brook Bridges	Whig	John Frederick Sackville	
1769 by-election	Sir Brook Bridges	Whig	Sir Charles Farnaby	
1774	Hon. Charles Marsham		Thomas Knight, junior	
1780	Hon. Charles Marsham		Filmer Honywood	
1790	Sir Edward Knatchbull, 8th Bt		Filmer Honywood	
1796	Sir Edward Knatchbull, 8th Bt		Sir William Geary, Bt	Tory
1802	Filmer Honywood	Whig	Sir William Geary, Bt	Tory
1806	Sir Edward Knatchbull, 8th Bt	Tory	William Honywood	Whig
1812	Sir Edward Knatchbull, 8th Bt	Tory	Sir William Geary, Bt	Tory
1818	Sir Edward Knatchbull, 8th Bt	Tory	William Philip Honywood	Whig
1819 by-election	Sir Edward Knatchbull, 9th Bt	Tory	William Philip Honywood	Whig
1830	Sir Edward Knatchbull, 9th Bt	Tory	Thomas Law Hodges	Whig
1831	Thomas Rider	Whig	Thomas Law Hodges	Whig
1832	Constituency abolished: see Eastern Kent, Western Kent			

== Election results ==
=== Elections in the 1790s ===
General election, 30 June 1790: Kent
Party	Candidate	Votes	%
Tory	Sir Edward Knatchbull	4,285	
Whig	Filmer Honywood	3,101	
Tory	Charles Marsham	2,724	

General election, 16 June 1796: Kent
Party	Candidate	Votes	%
Tory	Sir Edward Knatchbull	5,211	
Tory	Sir William Geary	4,418	
Whig	Filmer Honywood	4,285	
Tory gain from Whig			
Tory hold			

=== Elections in the 1800s ===
General election, 13 July 1802: Kent
Party	Candidate	Votes	%
Whig	Filmer Honywood	4,761	
Tory	Sir William Geary	4,085	
Tory	Sir Edward Knatchbull	3,933	
Whig gain from Tory			
Tory hold			

General election, 11 November 1806: Kent
Party	Candidate	Votes	%
Whig	William Philip Honywood	1,854	
Tory	Sir Edward Knatchbull	1,852	
Tory	Sir William Geary	828	
Tory hold			
Whig hold			

General election, 13 May 1807: Kent
Party	Candidate	Votes	%
Tory	Sir Edward Knatchbull	Unopposed	
Whig	William Philip Honywood	Unopposed	
Tory hold			
Whig hold			

=== Elections in the 1810s ===
General election, 13 October 1812: Kent
Party	Candidate	Votes	%
Tory	Sir William Geary	Unopposed	
Tory	Sir Edward Knatchbull	Unopposed	
Tory gain from Whig			
Tory hold			

General election, 27 June 1818: Kent
Party	Candidate	Votes	%
Tory	Sir Edward Knatchbull	3,417	93.0
Whig	William Philip Honywood	2,997	81.6
Tory	Sir William Geary	934	25.4
Tory hold			
Whig gain from Tory			

Kent by-election 16 November 1819
Party	Candidate	Votes	%
Tory	Sir Edward Knatchbull	Unopposed	
Tory hold			

=== Elections in the 1820s ===
General election, 18 March 1820: Kent
Party	Candidate	Votes	%
Whig	William Philip Honywood	Unopposed	
Tory	Sir Edward Knatchbull	Unopposed	
Whig hold			
Tory hold			

General election, 20 June 1826: Kent
Party	Candidate	Votes	%
Whig	William Philip Honywood	Unopposed	
Tory	Sir Edward Knatchbull	Unopposed	
Whig hold			
Tory hold			

=== Elections in the 1830s ===
General election, 9 August 1830: Kent
Party	Candidate	Votes	%
Whig	Thomas Law Hodges	Unopposed	
Ultra-Tory	Sir Edward Knatchbull	Unopposed	
Whig hold			
Ultra-Tory gain from Tory			

General election, 11 May 1831: Kent
Party	Candidate	Votes	%
Whig	Thomas Law Hodges	Unopposed	
Whig	Thomas Rider	Unopposed	
Whig hold			
Whig gain from Ultra-Tory			
