= Terre Haute (disambiguation) =

Terre Haute may refer to:

== Places in the United States ==
- Terre Haute, Indiana
  - Terre Haute metropolitan area
  - Terre Haute Regional Airport
  - Terre Haute station (Amtrak)
- Terre Haute Township, Henderson County, Illinois
  - Terre Haute, Illinois
- Terre Haute, Iowa
- Terre Haute, Missouri
- Terre Haute, Ohio

== Other uses ==
- Terre Haute (play), by Edmund White, 2006
- Terre Haute (novel), by Will Aitken, 1989

== See also ==
- Haute (disambiguation)
