= William Sandys, 1st Baron Sandys =

English diplomat

Arms of Sandys of The Vyne: Argent, a cross ragulée sable

William Sandys, 1st Baron Sandys (1470 – 6 December 1540), KG, of The Vyne in the parish of Sherborne St John, Hampshire, was an English diplomat, and a favourite of King Henry VIII, whom he served as Lord Chamberlain. In the 1520s he built a palatial Tudor-style mansion at "The Vyne", which survives in a reduced and classicised form as a possession of the National Trust.

== Origins ==
William was a younger son of Sir William Sandys (1440–1496) of The Vyne. His mother, his father's second wife, was Edith Cheyne, daughter of Sir John Cheyne of Shurland on the Isle of Sheppey in Kent. His sister was Edith Sandys, whose first husband was Ralph Neville, Lord Neville (died 1498), the son and heir of Ralph Neville, 3rd Earl of Westmorland.

== Career ==
As a young man, he gained preferment at court and was soon associated with the future King Henry VIII, assisting at his knighthood and at the reception of his future wife Catherine of Aragon. He was appointed as a Knight of the Body to Henry VIII, becoming a close companion to the King in the early years of his reign. In 1517 he was appointed Treasurer of Calais, a personal possession of the king, and in 1518 was made a Knight of the Garter. He was apparently instrumental in organising the meeting of the English and French kings at the Field of the Cloth of Gold, near Calais. He was created Baron Sandys of The Vyne, in 1523. In 1530 he was made Henry's Lord Chamberlain and later that same year he was appointed Captain of Guisnes, a position he held until his death in 1540. Guines, to give it its modern spelling, is some 7 miles south of Calais. At the time of his appointment, it was the main outpost of English authority in the Pale of Calais. Its strategic importance was considerable and this appointment was no sinecure. His responsibility for the castle and county of Guisnes took him out of England frequently, especially in the years 1526 to 1529 and again between 1538 and 1540.

It was almost certainly at Guisnes that he first contracted the sweating sickness which, in later life sometimes kept him from court. In January 1529 he was so ill that he could not walk; in October 1533 the sweating sickness returned. By March 1534 he was so ill that he almost died. This was almost certainly malaria, which was rife in marshy areas of Europe at that time. Guines is a low-lying area, once marshy and subject to frequent flooding from the sea and land.

King Henry VIII visited him three times at the Vyne, once with his queen, Anne Boleyn, whom Sandys was later to escort to her imprisonment in the Tower of London. He is known to have disapproved of the King's marriage to Anne, and as a result, spent less time at court. Although his sister Edith had married, secondly, Thomas Darcy, 1st Baron Darcy de Darcy, one of the leaders of the Pilgrimage of Grace (1536), Sandys certainly played no part in the uprising. In October 1536 he was summoned to "attend upon the King's own person" with 400 men, and, on 10 October, was ordered to muster at Ampthill, Bedfordshire, and to "prepare victuals and lodging for the King and his train", a task for which he would have been well qualified as Henry's Lord Chamberlain. Later he accompanied Thomas Howard, 3rd Duke of Norfolk as far as Cambridge but took no further action in the suppression of the rebellion.

In his later years, Sandys seems to have taken no great part in court life but his responsibilities at Guisnes kept him very busy in the early years of his appointment and between 1538 and 1540. Most of his work at Guisnes involved the refortification of the castle and town. Nevertheless, despite his frequent attention to these tasks, the castle, in particular, was reported as being practically indefensible for much of that period. In 1540 Arthur Plantagenet, 1st Viscount Lisle, the Lord Deputy of Calais was accused of having let the defences of Calais and Guisnes be so reduced that they could easily have been taken by an enemy. Under suspicion, he was imprisoned in the Tower. Remarkably, Sandys does not appear to have been implicated.

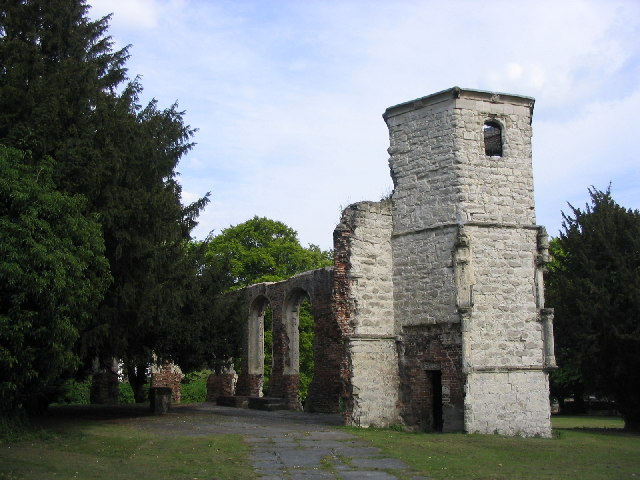
Holy Ghost Chapel, Basingstoke, the burial place of its founder, the 1st Baron Sandys

He returned to The Vyne from Calais in October 1540. On 7 December, Lord Matravers, the Lord Deputy of Calais, received a message from England announcing that Sandys had died at The Vyne. On that same day, Henry VIII wrote to the Council of Calais advising them that "the Lord Chamberlain, who was captain of Guisnes is dead.". On 10 October, the French ambassador in London reported back to France that "lord Sens (sic) died four days ago, who was much esteemed here and was one of the few ancient captains left." He was buried in the Chapel of the Guild of the Holy Ghost in Basingstoke, which he had founded, near his residence at The Vyne, and parts of his tomb survive within the ruins of the chapel.

== William Sandys and Anne Boleyn ==
Henry VIII fell for Anne Boleyn in 1526, the same year in which Sandys was appointed Lord Chamberlain and Captain of Guisnes. By 1529 Anne Boleyn was accompanying Henry as frequently as if she were the Queen. During those years Sandys spent some 18 months in Guisnes but, otherwise, his responsibilities at Court as Lord Chamberlain would have meant that he had frequent occasions to make provision for Anne Boleyn and her household, and that he would have known her well.

In 1532 he attended the ceremony at which she was raised to the peerage as the Marquess of Pembroke. In 1533 he was one of the several lords who accompanied her from Greenwich to Westminster for her coronation. In October 1535 he hosted her and Henry's visit to The Vyne, when she was Queen. On the following 9 May Sandys was summoned to a meeting of the Privy Council to consider "matters relating to the surety of [the King's] person, his honour, and the tranquillity of the realm"; on 12 May he attended the trial of the four men accused of committing adultery with the Queen, and on 15 May, after escorting her from Greenwich to the Tower of London, he was one of the jury which found her guilty of adultery, incest and treason.

== Marriage and issue ==
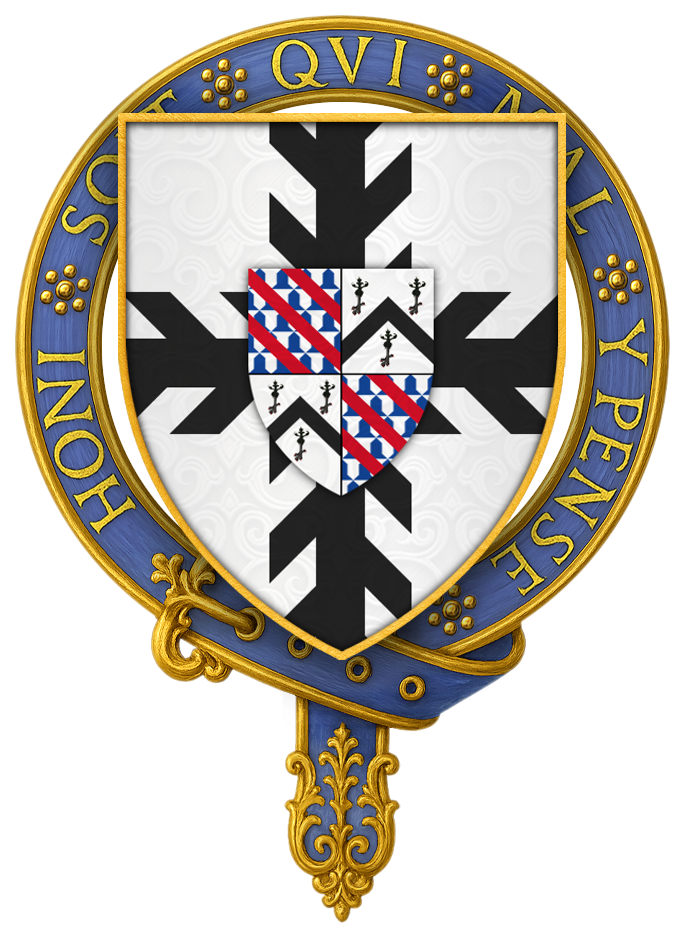
Arms of William Sandys, 1st Baron Sandys, KG, with inescutcheon of pretence of his heiress wife Margery Bray

He married Margery Bray (his half second cousin), the daughter and heiress of John Bray, half brother to Sir Reginald Bray, one of the powerful counsellors of King Henry VII. He had at least three sons and four daughters, including:

- Thomas Sandys, 2nd Baron Sandys, of The Vyne, eldest son and heir;
- Mary Sandys, who married Sir William Pelham, and was the mother of Sir William Pelham and Sir Edmund Pelham, Lord Chief Baron of the Irish Exchequer.
- Alice Sandys, who married Walter Hungerford, 1st Baron Hungerford of Heytesbury and had issue.

== Cultural references ==
He is a minor character in the historical novel The Man on a Donkey by H. F. M. Prescott.

He appears in William Shakespeare's Henry VIII as Lord Sands, who flirts with Anne Boleyn when she arrives at court and comments unfavourably upon the new fashions brought over from France.

== Notes ==
Peerage of England
New creation	Baron Sandys; 1523–1540	Succeeded by Thomas Sandys
Political offices
Preceded by The Earl of Arundel	Lord Chamberlain; 1530–1535	Succeeded by William Paulet
