= Geoffrey Lowther =

Geoffrey Lowther (fl. 1422), was an English Member of Parliament (MP).

He was a Member of the Parliament of England for Kent in 1422.
