= Thomas Cobham (MP) =

English politician

Thomas Cobham, 3rd Baron Cobham (c. 1343 – 8 February 1394) was an English nobleman and politician.

== Life ==
Thomas Cobham was the eldest son of Sir John Cobham (1319–61) of Randall in Shorne, Kent and the brother of John Cobham, also an MP for Kent. he succeeded his father in 1361, inheriting the manor of Randall and Allington Castle. His first wife was Maud Morice; his second, a woman named Beatrice, who outlived him. He died in 1394 and was buried in Birling church. His main heir was his son, Reynold, from his first marriage.

== Career ==
In the early 1370s Cobham twice sailed to Ireland for military service with the King's lieutenant, William of Windsor. He also joined Thomas, Earl of Warwick, for the 1372 naval expedition to relieve La Rochelle. He was knighted by 1372.

He was elected a Member of Parliament for Kent in 1376, May 1382, November 1384, and November 1390. He was appointed High Sheriff of Kent for 1377–78.
