= William Scott (died 1434) =

English Member of Parliament

William Scott (fl.1430), was an English Member of Parliament (MP).

Scott was a Member of the Parliament of England for Kent in 1430.
