= John Freningham =

English politician

John Freningham (1345–1410) was an English politician and a member of parliament for Kent.

== Life ==
Freningham was born in East Farleigh, the eldest son and heir of Ralph Freningham, MP, and his wife Katherine. Circa 1365, he married Alice Uvedale, the daughter of Thomas Uvedale, MP. They had no children.

== Career ==
Freningham was appointed High Sheriff of Kent for 1378 – 79 and 1393–94 and elected member of parliament for Kent in October 1377, 1381 and 1399.

He was a member of Henry IV's council from 1 November 1399 to 10 March 1401.

== Death ==
His nephew, John Pympe, son of his sister and Reynold Pympe, was his main heir.
