= William Haute (MP) =

English politician

William Haute (1390–1462) of Bishopsbourne, Kent, was an English politician.

== Early life ==
Haute was born 1390 in Waddenhall, Kent, the eldest son of Sir Nicholas Haute, MP, of Wadden Hall in Waltham, Kent, and Alice, daughter of Sir Thomas Couen or Cawne of Ightham Mote and his wife Lora (Moraunt). William's mother having died in March 1400, leaving him as her heir, his father remarried to Eleanor Flambard (daughter of Edmund Flambard of Shepreth, Cambridgeshire), formerly the wife of Walter Tyrrell of Avon (between Ringwood and Christchurch), Hampshire.

William Haute thus became stepbrother to Sir John Tyrrell of East Horndon, later to be Speaker of the House of Commons and Treasurer of the Royal Household. In 1415, for Henry V's expedition to France, both Sir Nicholas Haute and his son William were mustered to join the retinue of Humphrey, Duke of Gloucester. William chose to enlist not in his father's company but in that of Tyrrell his stepbrother, and in that capacity was at the Battle of Agincourt. Nicholas is thought to have died, perhaps of wounds, within a year or so after his return to England: William had succeeded to him by 1417, and Eleanor died in 1422.

== Two marriages ==
Haute was a Member of Parliament for the Shire of Kent in 1419, and before October of that year he married Margaret Berwyk, daughter of Sir Hugh Berwyk of Frilsham, Berkshire. She was the sister and heiress of Thomas Berwyk, and the widow of Ralph Butler of Gloucestershire. William and Margaret had one daughter. In 1420–1421 they together conducted a suit against William Sevenoke for the wardship of one William Bryan of Turville, Buckinghamshire, in a case which drew in the mayor and aldermen of the city of London. He was appointed Sheriff of Kent for the year of 1420–21, during which he supervised elections for the county to three parliaments. In 1423 he was a commissioner for weirs and impediments to navigation between Reculver and Maidstone. From 1424 he held commission of the peace for Kent, During the 1420s his relations with John and Edmund Tyrrell presumably encouraged his continuing allegiance to the Duke of Gloucester.

His second marriage, to Joan Wydeville (1410-1481), daughter of Richard Wydeville (1385–1441) (of Grafton, Northamptonshire and Maidstone, Kent) and his wife Joan (Bittlesgate), was arranged in the middle of 1429, to take place in Calais. At this time Wydeville was newly appointed Captain of Calais, and Haute was seeking to join the retinue of Sir John Stuard at Rysbanck Tower. Considerable endowments were agreed upon on both sides, those made by Haute involving the intention to frustrate his former wife's entail of her estates upon their daughter. He also acted as feoffee for estates of Sir John Passhele, his wife's brother-in-law. In the same year he stood surety in £100 for John, Earl of Oxford, who had married without licence while yet in wardship, and late in 1429 he was again MP for Kent.

== Wydeville associations ==
Haute developed a friendship with his father-in-law, and having served again for the Shire in 1432 supported Wydeville at his election in 1433. Together they attended the council of spring 1434 at which Gloucester, complaining of the progress of the French war, fell into dissent with John of Lancaster, who could expect Wydeville's loyalty as his chamberlain. Although his overseas service is not well understood, from the earlier 1430s onwards Haute held numerous commissions for array, musters for France, oyer and terminer, escapes from prisons, smuggling, etc. and his continuing commissions for the peace.

The marriage of the younger Richard Wydeville (future 1st Earl Rivers) to Jacquetta of Luxembourg, widow of John of Lancaster, followed in c. 1435, and Elizabeth Woodville was born c. 1437. In 1441 Richard Wydeville senior appointed Haute executor of his will, and he retained a trusted position in his son's family circle. He was also executor to Edward Tyrrell. He represented Kent in Parliament a fourth time in 1450. He did not always occupy the same political stance as the younger Wydeville, however, and showed some favour to the cause of Jack Cade (perhaps misliking the growing power of James Fiennes, 1st Baron Saye and Sele), receiving a pardon in that connection and retaining his commission for the peace until 1453.

== Last years ==
His failure in two Chancery causes in the years following, concerning his trusteeships, were more damaging. It was apparently late in life that William Haute made a petition to Henry VI in consideration of his military service:

"Please it unto your highnesse of youre most habundant grace to considre the long good and contynuell service the whyche your full humble servant William Haute Squier hath doon to youre most noble ffader whom god assoill and to you soverain lorde in the werres of ffraunce bicause of whiche he is so broken and brused, and comen to so grete age that he may not nowe well labour nor travayle, to graunt him youre gracious lettres to be made after the forme and effect of a cedule herto annexed, and he shal pray to god for you and for youre most noble estate."

Having been entrusted in January 1461 with certain responsibilities in preparations to resist the army of Margaret of Anjou, Haute died at the end of September 1462. He therefore could not know of his niece Elizabeth's marriage and coronation as the Queen Consort of King Edward IV in 1464. His will reveals that he possessed a large collection of religious relics.

== Children ==
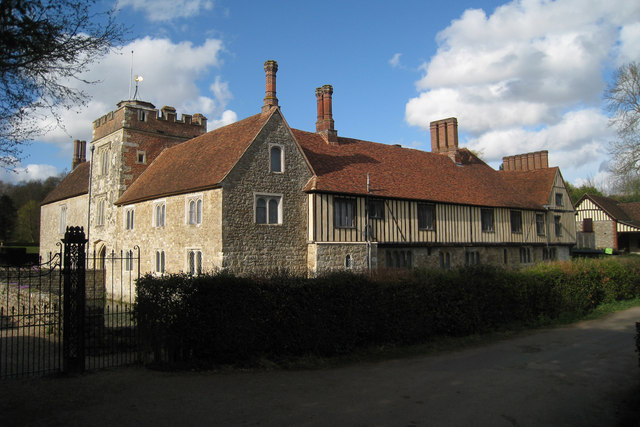
Ightham Mote, greatly developed by Richard Haute during the later 15th century

William Haute and Joan Wydeville had four sons and five daughters. The family is represented among the Pedigrees of the Harleian Visitations for Kent, and William himself mentions several of them in his will.

- (Sir) William Haute of Hautesbourne, who married Joan, daughter of Henry Horne, MP. They were the parents of one son, (Sir) Thomas Hawte, who married Elizabeth, sister of Sir Thomas Frowyk, and one daughter Alice (wife of William Cromer/Crowmer, Knight, of Tunstall, Kent).
- Richard Haute ("the elder"), Esquire, who inherited Ightham Mote, greatly enlarged and improved the manor house there. He married Elizabeth Tyrrell (daughter of Sir Thomas Tyrrell of Heron (Essex) and Anne Marney), widow of Sir Robert Darcy (who had died in 1469). A tutor to Prince Edward, one of the Princes in the Tower (King Edward V), Richard was attainted for association with Buckingham's Rebellion but escaped execution, was pardoned, and died in 1487. Elizabeth died c. 1507.
- Edward Haute, Esq., living in 1492. Was listed in taking part in the funeral of his cousin, Elizabeth Woodville.
- James Haute, Esq., living in 1473. He married _____. They had three sons, Henry, Esq., Edward, and Richard, and one daughter, Alice.
- Alice Haute (living 1512), second wife of the Yorkist Sir John Fogge, of Ashford, Kent, to which marriage she carried the Haute manor of Ashenfield in Waltham. She was a great-grandmother of King Henry VIII's sixth consort, Katherine Parr.
- Anne Haute, for a long time engaged to Sir John Paston, but did not marry him.
- Joan Haute, married (as his 2nd wife) George Darrell, Knight, of Littlecote, Wiltshire.
- Elizabeth Haute, married Robert Baynton, Knight, of Faulstone (in Bishopston), Wiltshire.
- Margaret Haute.
