= Thomas Wood (judge) =

English judge (died 1502)

Sir Thomas Wood KS (died 31 August 1502), in archaic spelling Wode, of Childrey in Berkshire (now in Oxfordshire), was an English landowner, lawyer, administrator and politician who became Chief Justice of the Common Pleas.

== Origins ==
There is no certainty over his origins. In 1936, the History of Parliament suggested that he was born before 1449 in or near Oxfordshire and that his father, a landowner who died before 1478, was also Thomas. In 2018, the Oxford Dictionary of National Biography rejected on heraldic grounds claims that he was from gentry families named Wood in Cambridgeshire, Cheshire and Suffolk, suggesting instead that he was born before 1452 in or close to either Hampshire or Wiltshire. He is first mentioned in records as a gentleman living in London in 1473, presumably studying and practising law.

== Career ==
After training at the Middle Temple, by 1475 he was retained as counsel by Winchester College and in 1478 entered public life. Acquiring an estate at Childrey, he was appointed a JP of the quorum for Berkshire, staying on the bench for life, and was elected a Member of Parliament for Wallingford. He also obtained confirmation of his charters concerning his lands at Childrey.

From 1483 he was appointed to various royal commissions for Berkshire. and was made a serjeant-at-law in 1486, From 1487 he was a JP for the five counties of the Western Circuit, acting as an assize judge there until 1500, and in 1488 was raised to a King's Serjeant.

In 1489, jointly with Thomas Englefield, he obtained custody of the lands of the late Nicholas Stucley, of Affeton in Devon, together with the right to select a wife for his heir Thomas Stucley, then aged 13. On 24 November 1495 he was made a puisne justice of the Court of Common Pleas, In 1496, when King Henry VII made his will, he was named as one of the trustees.

On 28 October 1500 he became Chief Justice of the Common Pleas, followed next year by a knighthood. His presidency of the court was brief however, as he died in office on 31 August 1502. He was buried at Reading Abbey in accordance with his will made three days earlier, in which he bequeathed a gold ring with a ruby and two books to Sir Thomas Frowick who succeeded him as Lord Chief Justice.

== Family ==
With a first wife whose name is unknown and who died before 1491, he had a daughter and heiress Anne (or Elizabeth) Wood. She was married to her father's ward Thomas Stucley (1475-1542), later knighted and a Sheriff of Devon, and they were the parents of Sir Hugh Stucley (1496-1560). Her arms were Gules crusily or, three demi-woodmen with clubs or.

After 1491 he married Margaret Delamare, widow of Robert Lenham, of Tidmarsh, and daughter of Sir Thomas Delamare, of Aldermaston, a Sheriff of Berkshire. She died on 5 December 1499 leaving a young son Henry Lenham, for whom her widower took responsibility, and was buried at Tidmarsh.

Legal offices
Preceded by Sir Thomas Bryan	Chief Justice of the Common Pleas; 1500–1502	Succeeded by Sir Thomas Frowick
