= Arnold Savage (died 1375) =

English knight and administrator

Arms of Arnold Savage: Argent, six lions rampant sable.

Sir Arnold Savage (Note: Also Ernaud Savage.) (died 1375), Lord of Bobbing, was a 14th century English knight and administrator from the Savage family, who was a commissioner of array in Kent (1346), lieutenant of the Seneschal of Gascony (1350), sat in the parliament of January 1352, Warden of the Coasts of Kent (1355), Mayor of Bordeaux (1359-63), and was employed in negotiations between England and Castile and France.

== Life ==
Savage was the son of Roger Savage (died 1308) and Clarice de la Warre. Arnold served in France in 1345, and was a commissioner of array in Kent in 1346. Appointed as lieutenant of the Seneschal of Gascony, John de Cheverston and sat in the parliament of January 1352, was also appointed as Warden of the Coasts of Kent on 13 April 1355. He then served as mayor of Bordeaux from 12 March 1359 until 1363. Employed in negotiations with Pedro of Castile during 1352 and with France in 1371 and 1373 to treat for peace. He died in 1375, his son Arnold succeeding him.

== Family and issue ==
Arnold married firstly Margery, daughter of Michael Poynings, Lord Poynings and Joan de Rokesley. He married secondly Joan Eychingham and they had the following known issue:

- Arnold Savage (died 1410), married Joan Eychingham, had issue.
- Joan Savage (1332-1359), married Sir Ralph St. Leger (b. 1330) and they had issue.
