= Thomas Fogge =

14th-century English politician

Sir Thomas Fogge
- Died: 13 July 1407
- Buried: Canterbury Cathedral
- Spouse: Joan de Valence
- Issue: Thomas Fogge; John Fogge son Fogge

Sir Thomas Fogge (died 13 July 1407) was an English politician and soldier.

== Career ==
The names of Thomas Fogge's parents are not known with certainty, although he is said to have been the son of Sir Thomas Fogge, Knight of the Shire for Kent in 1377, 1379 and 1381, who married Anne, Countess of Joyeux in France, and was buried at Glastonbury, Somerset.

In his early years he was a soldier of fortune on the continent. He purchased land around Canterbury, in Chartham, Harbledown and Boughton under Blean. By October 1360 he had been knighted. He was elected Member of Parliament for Kent in 1376, 1378, November 1380, 1381, February 1383, October 1383, November 1384, and February 1388.

Fogge died on 13 July 1407. He was survived by his wife, and provided for her in his will. His heir was his grandson, William Fogge.

He was buried in Canterbury Cathedral, of which he had been a benefactor.

== Friendship ==
Sir William Septvenn requested in his testament of 1407, ‘as a Canterbury man’, to be buried next to Sir Thomas Fogge in Canterbury Cathedral.

In Canterbury Cathedral, some little distance higher in the nave was an inscription in French, with the figure of a knight in armour, and shields of arms, for Sir William Septvans, who died in 1407. Near it was an inscription in Latin, with the figures of a knight and his wife, with their shields of arms, for Sir William Septvans, who died anno 1448, and Elizabeth his wife, daughter of Sir John Peche, and these verses:

Sum quod eris, volui quod vis, credens quasi credis.

Vivere forte diu, mox ruo morte specu

Cessi quo nescis, nec quomodo, quando sequeris.

Hinc simul in cælis ut simus quoque preceris.

This Sir William Septvans, says Weever, served in the wars of France under King Edward III. It appears by his will in the consistory court of Canterbury, that his residence was at Milton, near Canterbury, and that which was very remarkable, he gave manumission to divers of his slaves and natives.

== Marriage and issue ==
Before May 1365 Fogge married Joan de Valence (d. 8 July 1420), widow of William Costede of Costede, Kent, and daughter of Sir Stephen de Valence of Repton, by whom he had three sons:

- Thomas Fogge (d. 1405), eldest son, who married Eleanor St. Leger, daughter of Sir Thomas St. Leger, by whom he had a son
  - William Fogge, born 31 October 1396 at Cheriton, Kent. According to Robertson:

In the year 1396, Thomas (once mis-called or misprinted John) Fogge, junior, whose wife was Alianora (daughter of Thomas St. Leger), brought to [Cheriton] church, for baptism, his infant son and heir, William Fogge, who was ultimately the coheir also of his grandfather Thomas St. Leger. The priest, "Dom." or "Sir" William Newynton, declared to the assembled congregation "that God had, in that infant, multiplied his people after the late pestilence". Here also Thomas Fogge, the father of the infant, caused "Sir" William Newynton, to make an entry in the Missal or Service Book of the church to the effect that William Fogge (the infant) was born on the Vigil of All Saints in the year 1396. This entry was made in the presence of Ralph Norys and other parishioners upon All Souls Day 1396.

This William Fogge had died by February 1447, when his considerable inheritance came to Sir John Fogge (d. 1490). In The Family Chronicle of Richard Fogge of Danes Court in Tilmanstone published in 1868, it is strongly suggested that this was the William Fogge who married the daughters of Wadham and Septvans.

At the siege of Rouen in 1418 the Foster Roll blazoned his arms as: Argent on a fess between three annulets sable as many mullets of the field.

- John Fogge, Esquire, named executor in his father's will, who was the father of Sir John Fogge (d. 1490).

His male line blazoned their arms as: Argent on a fess between three annulets sable as many mullets pierced of the field.

- Another son, who died without issue.

== Monument in Canterbury Cathedral ==
He was buried in the nave of Canterbury cathedral. Nearer the north side of the Cathedral, an inscription and figure of a knight with shields of arms, as follows:

Thomas Fogge, jacet hic, jacet hic sua sponsa Johanna,

Sint celo cives per te Deus hos et Osanna;

Regni Protector Francos Britones superavit

Nobilium rector sicuti Leo Castra predavit

Et quoq, Militiam sic pro patria peramavit

Ad summan patriam deus hunc ab agone vocavit.

By his will in the consistory court of Canterbury, anno 1407, he gave ten marcs to the work of this church; and it is recorded in the obituary, that Sir Thomas Fogge gave 20l. sterling, towards the new chapter-house; and his wife gave 20d. to each monk in the convent. Joan, Lady Fogge’s will of 1419, recorded in Archbishop Chichele’s register, also bequeathed a silver gilt cup to the cathedral priory. She was descended from the royal blood of the kings of England, being daughter of Sir Stephen de Valence, who was descended from William de Valence, Earl of Pembroke, half-brother by the mother to King Henry III.— She died July 8, 1425. The shield of arms of this Sir Thomas Fogge, carved and painted on wood, hung till of late on the pillar of the nave, next his place of burial.
