= Thomas Frowyk =

English justice

Sir Thomas Frowyk
- Born: c.1460 Gunnersbury, Middlesex
- Died: 7 October 1506
- Spouses: Joan Bardville; Elizabeth Carnevyle
- Issue: Thomas Frowyk; Frideswide Frowyk
- Father: Sir Thomas Frowyk
- Mother: Jane Sturgeon

Sir Thomas Frowyk KS (c. 1460 – 7 October 1506) was an English justice.

== Family ==
Born at Gunnersbury, Middlesex, Thomas Frowyk was the son of a London mercer, Sir Thomas Frowyk, by his second wife, Jane Sturgeon, daughter of Richard Sturgeon. He had a sister, Isabel Frowyk, who married Sir Thomas Haute (d. 1502, son of Sir William Hawte), a sister Elizabeth Frowyke, who married Thomas Bedlow (d. 1478) and a brother, Sir Henry Frowyk. His grandfather, Henry Frowick, was also a mercer (five times Master), alderman (Bassishaw ward, 1424–57) and twice Lord Mayor of London (1435-6 and 1444–5). Frowyk was mentioned in the 1464 will of his grandmother, Isabella Frowyk. An important seat of the Frowyk family was at South Mimms, Hertfordshire, where Sir Thomas's ancestors and others of his kin are represented in a series of tombs and monuments in the parish church of St Giles. The present Sir Thomas however was buried at Finchley.

== Career ==
Frowyk is said to have been educated at Cambridge University. He was admitted to the Inner Temple, where he appears to have shared a chamber with Thomas Marowe (d.1505), Serjeant-at-law, author of the legal treatise, De Pace (On The Peace). Frowyk and John Kingsmill, Justice of the Common Pleas, were later among those appointed as executors of Marowe's will.

At the Inner Temple Frowyk 'gave readings in the autumn terms of 1492 (Westminster II cc.6–11) and 1495 (Prerogativa regis), readings which were often cited subsequently'.

He was appointed Common Serjeant of London about 1486, Serjeant-at-law in 1495, and King's Serjeant in November 1501. At about this time he was on retainer to the Earls of Stafford and the Dukes of Buckingham. He was appointed Chief Justice of the Common Pleas on 30 September 1502. In that year, with others, he formulated an important award between the town and university of Cambridge, adjusting disputes and defining their jurisdictions precisely. In his capacity as Chief Justice he wrote 'a significant dissenting judgment in the celebrated case of Orwell v. Mortoft (1505) contributing to the development, in later years, of the action on the case as an alternative process to recover a debt'.

Frowyk was knighted in 1502. He died 7 October 1506, and was buried at Finchley with his first wife, Joan (née Bardville), where a memorial to him was erected which was later defaced. The inscription in medieval French on her monument was apparently written by him, and expressed the wish to lie beside her:

"JOAN la feme THOMAS DE FROWICKE gist icy
Et le dit THOMAS pense de giser aveque luy."

He left a will dated 13 August 1505, with a codicil dated 6 October 1506.

He was said by Thomas Fuller to have been 'accounted the oracle of law in his age'.

== Marriages and issue ==
He first married Joan Bardville, with whom he had a son Thomas, who appears to have died young.

He married secondly, by 1498, Elizabeth Carnevyle, daughter of William Carnevyle of Tockington in Gloucestershire. They had a daughter, Frideswide, aged 8 on 2 February 1506, who was the first wife of Sir Thomas Cheyne, Lord Warden of the Cinque Ports.

After his death, his widow married Thomas Jakes (died 1516), one of his executors who was a Clerk of the Warrants of the Inner Temple. His niece Elizabeth, daughter of his brother Sir Henry, married Sir John Spelman, a Justice of the King's Bench.

== Sources ==
- Doe, Norman (2004). "Frowyk, Sir Thomas (c.1460–1506)". Oxford Dictionary of National Biography (online ed.). Oxford University Press. doi:10.1093/ref:odnb/10206. (Subscription, Wikipedia Library access or UK public library membership required.)
- Wedgwood, Josiah C. (1936). History of Parliament: Biographies of the Members of the Commons House 1439–1509. London: His Majesty’s Stationery Office. pp. 358–9.

Legal offices
Preceded by Sir Thomas Wode	Chief Justice of the Common Pleas; 1502–1506	Succeeded by Sir Robert Rede
