= Thomas Brockhill =

English politician

Thomas Brockhill (d. c. 1411) was an English politician.

== Life ==
Brockhill was probably a younger son (or nephew) of Thomas Brockhill of Saltwood, near Hythe, MP for Kent, and thus the brother of MP John Brockhill. He had a wife, Joan, and one daughter.

The family's name is still remembered in Saltwood's secondary school, Brockhill Park Performing Arts College and Brockhill Country Park.

== Career ==
Brockhill was appointed High Sheriff of Kent for the period May 1383 to November 1384 and was elected Member of Parliament for Kent in October 1382, 1385, 1395, January 1397, 1399 and 1402.
