= Richard Clitheroe (died 1420) =

English politician

Richard Clitheroe (died 1420), of Clitheroe, Lancashire and London and Goldstone in Ash-next-Sandwich, Kent, was an English politician.

Clitheroe married a woman named Alice and they had one son and probably one daughter.

He was a Member (MP) of the Parliament of England for Kent in 1406 and 1407.
