= Reynold Pympe =

English politician

Reynold Pympe (c. 1371–1426), of Nettlestead and Pympe's Court in East Farleigh, Kent, was an English politician.

Pympe was the son and heir of Sir William Pympe, MP, who died in 1375, when Reynold was around four years old.

Pympe was High Sheriff of Kent for 1409–10 and was elected Member of Parliament for Kent in 1411 and 1422.

His wife, whose first name was unrecorded, was the daughter of Sir Ralph Freningham of Farningham and West Barming, Kent. She was the sister of the MP, John Freningham. They had two sons, the eldest of whom predeceased him, leaving a child. Pympe was succeeded by the young grandchild, who also died young, and so the Pympe's Court and Nettlestead estates passed to Pympe's younger brother John.
