= Bensted =

Bensted is a surname. Notable people with the surname include:

- Eric Bensted (1901–1980), Australian cricketer
- Jake Bensted (born 1994), Australian judoka
- Emily Bensted (born 1986), Australian judoka
