= William Cheyne (15th-century MP) =

English politician

William Cheyne (died 1441), of Shurland in Eastchurch, Isle of Sheppey, Kent, was an English politician.

== Biography ==
Cheyne was the son and heir of Richard Cheyne of Shurland and Margery, daughter and coheiress of Robert Cralle of Cralle, Sussex.

Cheyne was Sheriff of Kent for 1423 and JP for Kent from 1416 to 1420 and 1422 to 1423. He was elected a Member of Parliament for Kent in March 1416.

== Family ==
Cheyne married firstly, before February 1405, Eleanor, daughter and coheiress of John Salerne I of Iden, Sussex and his wife Agnes. They had one son, John Cheyne, an MP for Kent in 1449.
