= Nicholas Potyn =

English politician

Nicholas Potyn (died 1398) was an English politician.

== Life ==
Potyn was the son of MP John Potyn of Rochester, Kent. He married a woman named Alice. The heir to his manors in Kent was his only daughter, Juliana (d.1417), whose second husband was Thomas St. Leger, a younger son of Sir Ralph St. Leger.

He was buried at the chapel of Holy Trinity at St. Dunstan-in -the-East. St Dunstan-in-the-East was a Church of England parish church on St Dunstan's Hill, halfway between London Bridge and the Tower of London in the City of London. The church was largely destroyed in the Second World War and the ruins are now a public garden.

== Career ==
He was controller of customs for London from 1375 to 1377 and JP for Kent from 1394 until his death.

Potyn was MP for Kent in 1391, 1393 and January 1397, and was appointed Sheriff of Kent for 1398, dying in office.

== Death ==
His heir was his daughter, Juliana.
