= Shurland =

Coordinates: 51.4075°N 0.8494°E

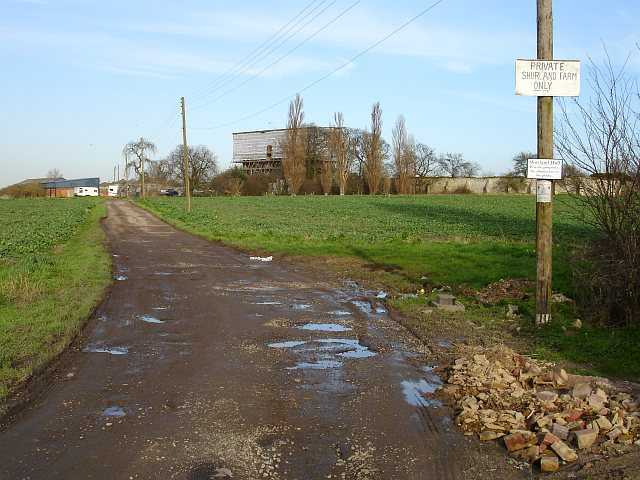
Looking towards Shurland Hall

Shurland is a place near Eastchurch, Isle of Sheppey, Kent, England. Shurland Hall stood here and was visited by Henry VIII of England and used during World War I for billeting.

== Shurland Hall ==
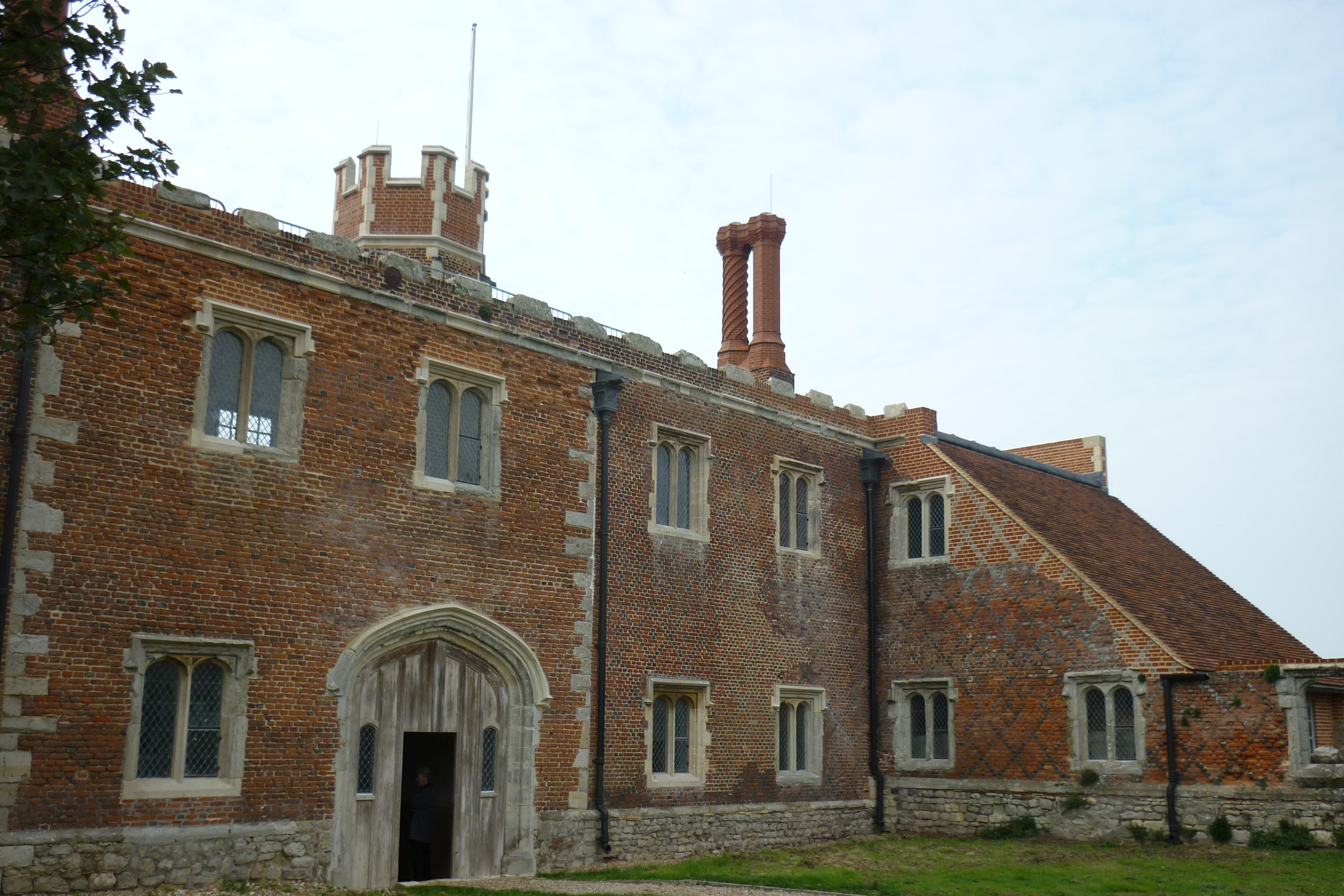
Shurland Hall in 2011

Shurland Hall, near Eastchurch, is named after its first owners, the De Shurland family. In 1188 Adam de Shurland possessed a mill with more than 1,000 acres (405 ha) of mixed land, mostly marsh with a small meadow: he also let a number of cottages thereabouts.

Sir Robert de Shurland (d. 1324), a member of the family, served in the Anglo-Scottish wars, including the siege of Caerlaverock (1300), where he was knighted; and shortly afterwards obtained a charter of free warren for his manor of Ufton, in the parish of Tunstall. He fought on the rebel baronial side at the Battle of Boroughbridge (1322), was captured, and was held for over a year in the Tower of London. On his release, he was appointed mayor of Bordeaux (1323–1324).

A curious legend (first recorded in the 17th century) surrounds Sir Robert. It is said that he killed a priest, and resolved to ask the king for a pardon. Mounted on horseback, he swam out to the Nore (north of Sheppey), where the king's ship was anchored, and gained forgiveness. On his return, he met an old woman who predicted that the horse that had helped save his life would be the cause of his death. To defy the prophecy, Sir Robert killed his horse; but later encountering its bones, he kicked them in scorn, only for a shard to pierce his foot, causing an infection from which he died. The tale takes elements from Italian, Slavic and Icelandic folklore (including the story of Oleg the Wise, and that of Örvar-Oddr). It was greatly popularised in a version published in 1837 by Richard Barham ("Thomas Ingoldsby"), as one of his Ingoldsby Legends.

Sir Robert died in 1324 leaving as his heir a daughter Margaret, who married William, son of Alexander Cheyne of Patrixbourne. To William passed the manor of Shurland. It remained in possession of the Cheyne family until the sixteenth century when it was sold by Sir Henry Cheyne. During the First World War troops were billeted at the Great Hall, and it suffered considerable damage as a result.

Shurland Hall is a Grade II listed building. In 2006 a grant of £300,000 was made by English Heritage to restore the hall's façade. The Spitalfields Historic Buildings Trust carried out the restoration work which was completed in 2011. The house was put on the open market for £1.5 million, and was sold.
