= James Peckham =

English politician (c.1346–1400)

James Peckham (c. 1346 – 1400) was an English politician.

== Life ==
Peckham was the eldest son of John and Ellen Peckham of Yaldham, near Wrotham, Kent. His first wife was named Margery. At some point by December 1376, he was married to the widow Lora Morant, the sole daughter and heir of Sir Thomas Morant, of Morant's Court, Chevening and widow of Sir Thomas Cawne. She brought him, among other estates, the manor of Barsted, near Borough Green, in Wrotham. He had two legitimate daughters and an acknowledged illegitimate son, John Wrotham. He is recorded as helpful to his stepchildren, Robert and Alice Couen, the children of his second wife Lora.

== Career ==
In 1377, he was poll tax collector for Kent.

Peckham was Member of Parliament for Kent 1372, October 1377, February 1383, February 1388, and September 1388.

He was appointed Sheriff of Kent in 1380 and 1389.
