= William Pecche =

Sir William Pecche (9 February 1359 – 1399) was an English member of parliament.

== Life ==
Pecche was the son of MP and Mayor of London, John Pecche. He married Joan Hadley, a daughter and coheiress of John Hadley, MP for London 1369–1402. Pecche's heir was his son, John.

== Career ==
Pecche was member of parliament for Kent in 1394 and September 1397.
