= John Darell (died 1438) =

English politician

John Darell (died 1438) was an English politician.

== Life ==
Darell was of Calehill in Little Chart, Scotney Castle in Lamberhurst, Kent. He was the second son of William Darell. The Darell family were from Sessay, Yorkshire. In 1400, he married Thomasina Barey of Faversham, who would only have been around twelve years old at this time. His second wife was Joan Chichele, a widow.

== Career ==
Darell was a member of parliament for Kent in 1407, May 1413, April 1414, 1417, 1425, 1427 and 1429, and Sheriff of Kent three times (1411, 1417 and 1422).
