= John Cobham (MP) =

English politician

John Cobham (died 12 November 1399) was an English politician.

== Life ==
Cobham was the son of John Cobham of Hever, Kent. His brother, Thomas Cobham, was also an MP for Kent. He married three times. Before 1363, he married Juliana, a widow from Sittingbourne, Kent. Around 1375, he married Joan d’Oyley from Staffordshire, also a widow. At some point before June 1398, he married a woman named Margaret.

== Career ==
Cobham was Member of Parliament for Sussex 1378 and 1385, Surrey January 1380, April 1384, November 1384 and Kent January 1390, 1394 and September 1397. He was considered a loyal adherent to Richard II of England.
