= Robert Clifford (MP) =

English politician

Robert Clifford (died 1423) was an English politician.

Clifford was the brother of Richard Clifford, Bishop of Worcester and London. Their ancestry is uncertain.

His first wife was a widow, named Jacqueline (or Jacoba) Emelden, the coheiress of the MP Richard Emelden. She died in 1391. Little is recorded about his second wife, Joan.

Clifford served as a Member of Parliament for Northumberland May 1382 and October 1382 and for Kent 1401, 1406 and November 1414. He was appointed High Sheriff of Northumberland in 1383 and High Sheriff of Kent for 1400 and 1415 (representing Kent as MP at the same time).

Clifford died in 1423, and was buried in the nave of Canterbury Cathedral.
