= Thomas Cheney =

Member of the Parliament of England

The Right Honourable Thomas Cheney KG PC
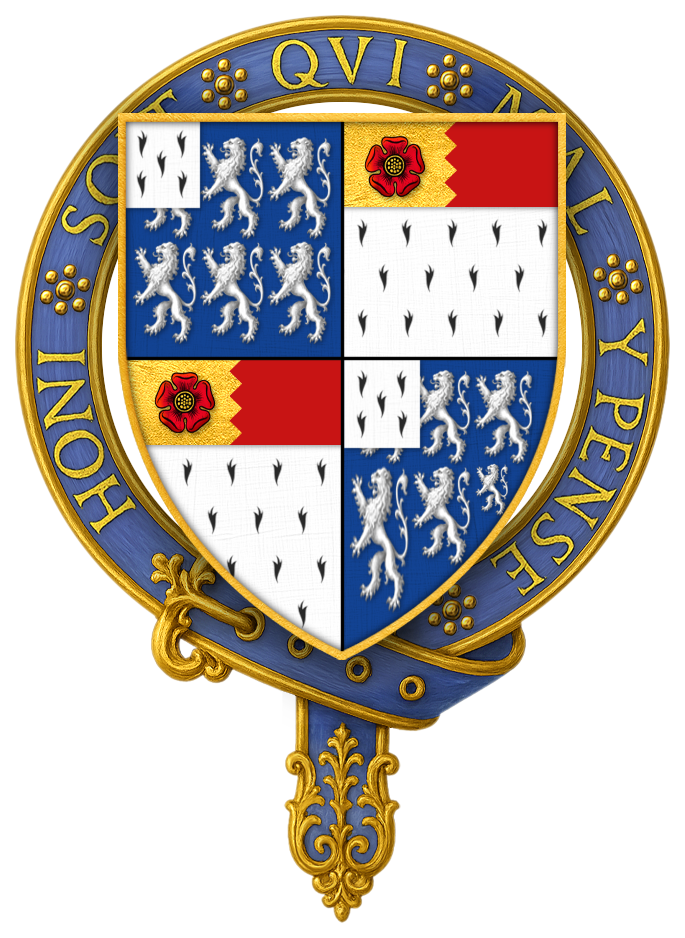
- Coat of arms of Sir Thomas Cheyne: Quarterly — 1 and 4, Azure, six lioncels rampant Argent, a canton Ermine; 2 and 3, Ermine, a chief per pale indented Or and Gules, in the dexter side a rose of the last
- Born: c. 1485; Shurland Hall
- Died: 16 December 1558 (aged 72–73); Tower of London
- Resting place: Minster Abbey, Isle of Sheppey; 51.4221°N 0.812011°E
- Occupation: Diplomat
- Spouses: Frideswide Frowyk (m. 1515; died 1528); Anne Broughton (m. 1539)
- Children: with Frideswide: John Cheney; Anne Cheney; Frances Cheney; Katherine Cheney; with Anne: Henry Cheney, 1st Baron Cheyne
- Parents: William Cheyne; Margaret Young
- Relatives: Thomas Boleyn (cousin)
- Family: Cheyne

Letter from Sir Thomas Cheyne to John Monynge [Monyn], dated at Shurland, 1 August [1547–1549]. The letter relates to orders from the Lord Protector, Edward Seymour, Duke of Somerset, regent for the boy king, Edward VI. It announces the despatch of letters by which the Duke has directed that 270 mariners be engaged for the royal service, within the liberties of the Cinque Ports, who are to be at Gillingham by the 12th of the month. To Cheyne, this number seems excessive, because he has never raised more than 50 or 60 at a time, and there are evidently not enough men at Sturbourne available. Monyn is directed to raise 60 men at the very least. He says that John Anthony can give him the names of some mariners available in Thanet, and Cheyne thinks that some can be found at Dover.

Sir Thomas Cheney (or Cheyne) (c. 1485 – 16 December 1558) of the Blackfriars, City of London and Shurland, Isle of Sheppey, Kent, was an English administrator and diplomat, Lord Warden of the Cinque Ports in south-east England from 1536 until his death.

== Early life ==
Thomas Cheney, born about 1485, was the son of William Cheney (d.1487) of Shurland Hall near Eastchurch, in the Isle of Sheppey, Kent, Constable of Queenborough Castle and Sheriff of Kent in 1477, by his second wife, Margaret Young.

Thomas Cheney's father, William, was the eldest surviving of eight sons and a daughter, and at his death in 1487 his property in Kent was inherited by Francis Cheney (d. 1512), his son and heir by his first marriage, but was in the possession of Francis Cheney's uncle, John Cheyne, Baron Cheyne until the latter's death without issue in 1499. Baron Cheyne's heir, his brother, Robert Cheney, died without issue in 1503, at which time Francis Cheney 'wrongfully took possession of their lands in Berkshire and Kent which should by an earlier settlement have passed to John, the son of a younger brother Roger'. Francis Cheney died without issue in January 1512, and Thomas Cheney succeeded to his father William's lands; however the other properties wrongfully acquired by Francis Cheney were awarded in 1515 to his cousin, John son of Roger Cheyne (d. 1499) of West Woodhay, Berkshire.

== Career ==
Cheney was appointed Sheriff of Kent in 1515, and was Justice of the Peace for Kent from 1526 until his death.

He was a favourite of Henry VIII's mistress, Anne Boleyn to whom he was distantly related, and she fought Cardinal Wolsey for his promotion in 1528 and 1529.

He was a knight of the shire from 1539 to 1558.

In 1550, he became a privy counsellor and owner of the Manor of Ospringe (in the parish of Faversham).

== Reign of Mary I ==
Mary sent him as ambassador to Charles V at Brussels in August 1553 to announce her accession to the throne. He was known by the title of his office as "Lord Warden".

In January 1554, Cheney gathered a force in Kent to resist Wyatt's rebellion. In London, there was a rumour that he held Dover Castle for the rebels..

== Death ==
Cheney died on 16 December 1558 at the Tower of London, and was buried on 3 January 1559 in St Katherine's chapel of Minster Abbey on the Isle of Sheppey. He was survived by his son, Henry, and three daughters, Anne, Frances and Katherine.

== Marriages and issue ==
Cheney married firstly, by 1515, Frideswide Frowyk (died c. 1528), the daughter of Sir Thomas Frowyk, by whom he had a son and three daughters:

- John Cheney, who predeceased his father
- Anne Cheney (d. 1553), who married Sir John Perrot, Lord Deputy of Ireland
- Frances Cheney (d. 1561), who married Nicholas Crispe (d. 1564)
- Katherine Cheney (d. before 1550), who married Sir Thomas Kempe (d. 7 March 1591) of Olantigh in Wye, Kent, by whom she had three daughters, Margaret Kempe, who married William Cromer (d. 12 May 1598); Anne Kempe, who married Sir Thomas Shirley, and Alice Kempe, who married firstly Sir James Hales (d. 1589), grandson of Sir James Hales (d. 1554), and secondly Sir Richard Lee (d.1608), illegitimate half-brother of Queen Elizabeth's champion, Sir Henry Lee

According to Lennard, Anne, Frances and Katherine were all daughters of Cheney's first marriage:

Sir Henry Cheyne, knight, summoned in 1572 as Lord Cheyne of Toddington, died s.p. in 1587, having wasted his estate. His three half-sisters, daughters of the first marriage of his father Sir Thomas Cheyne of Sheppey, K.G., were his coheirs. Anne Cheyne, the third of these, was the first wife of Sir John Perrot, the lord deputy of Ireland, and mother of Sir Thomas Perrot his heir. Sir John Perrot, who was reckoned a bastard son of Henry VIII., died in 1592.

Cheney married secondly, by dispensation dated 24 May 1539, Anne Broughton (d. 16 May 1562), stepdaughter and ward of John Russell, 1st Earl of Bedford, and daughter of Sir John Broughton (d. 24 January 1518). of Toddington, Bedfordshire, by Anne Sapcote (d. 14 March 1559), and granddaughter of Sir Robert Broughton by his first wife, Katherine de Vere, said to have been the illegitimate daughter of John de Vere, 13th Earl of Oxford, by whom he had a son, Henry Cheyne, 1st Baron Cheyne of Toddington, and a daughter. There is a monument to Cheyney's second wife at Toddington.

According to Rev. R. A. Maddison's "Lincolnshire Wills 1600-1617" (1891), Cheney also had an illegitimate "natural" son and daughter, Frances (c.1536-c.1608) who married her cousin William Cheney. Their daughter Elizabeth married John Killingworth. Elizabeth and John's daughter, Anne, married Richard Skepper (c.1495- c.1556). Richard Skepper had married as his 2nd wife Joan Legard whose son Edward (c.1552-c.1629) was the father of the Rev. William Skepper (1597-c.1650) - the "godson" of Frances Cheney.

Political offices
Preceded by The Duke of Richmond and Somerset	Lord Warden of the Cinque Ports; 1536–1542	Succeeded by The Viscount Lisle
Preceded by Sir William Paulet	Treasurer of the Household; 1539–1558	Succeeded by Sir Thomas Parry
Preceded by The Viscount Lisle	Lord Warden of the Cinque Ports; 1542–1558 (jointly with Thomas Seymour, 1545)	Succeeded by The Lord Cobham
Preceded by Not applicable	Lord-Lieutenant of Kent; 1551–1553?	Succeeded by The Lord Cobham
