= Arnold Savage =

Member of the Parliament of England

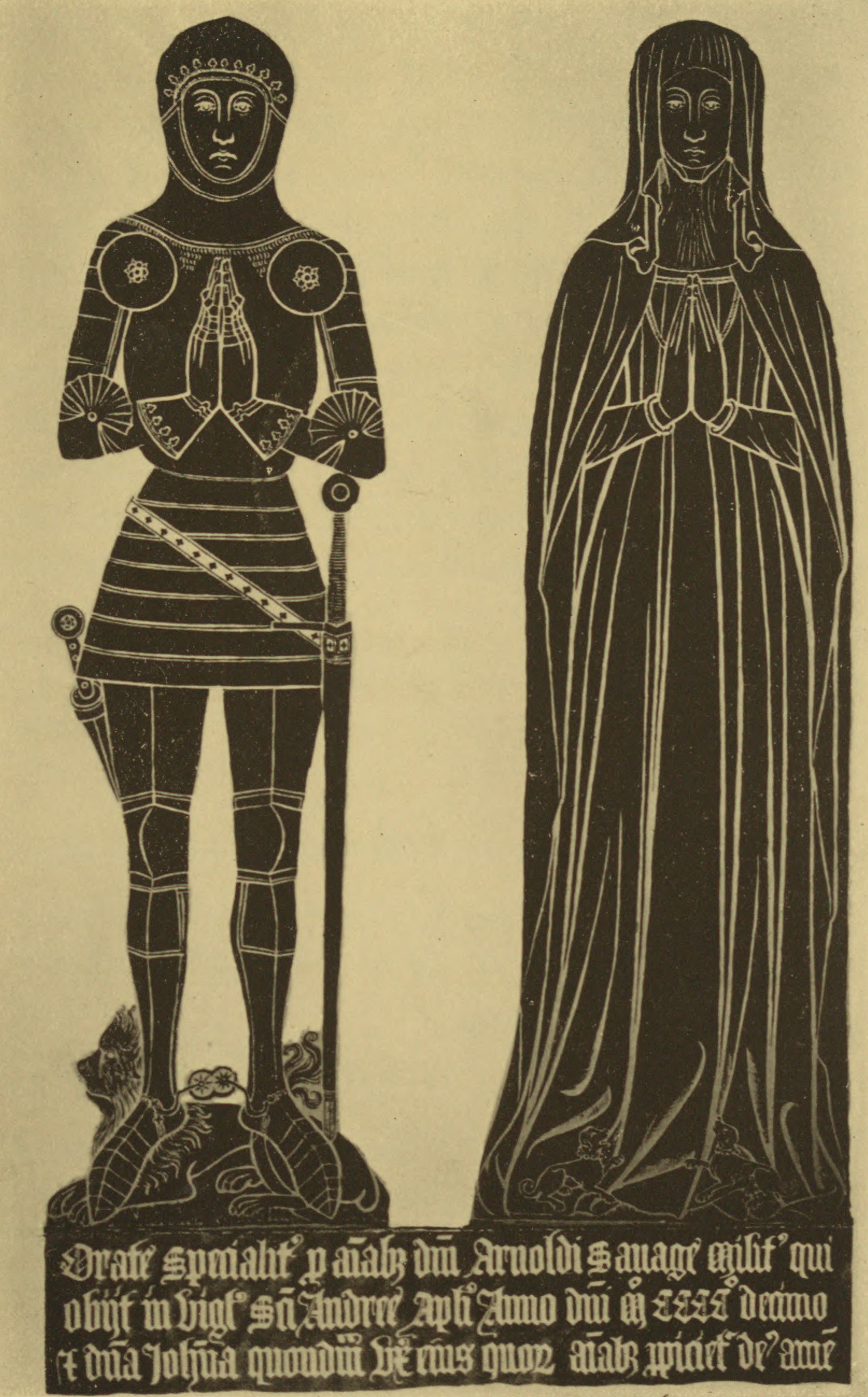
Brass of Sir Arnold Savage in the South Chancel of Bobbing Church, Kent.

Sir Arnold Savage of Bobbing, Kent (8 September 1358 – 1410) was the English Speaker of the House of Commons from 1400 to 1402 and then again from 1403 to 1404 and a Knight of the Shire of Kent who was referred to as "the great comprehensive symbol of the English people" (perhaps because, like a lot of people in England, he was sued for debt by London traders).

He was born in Bobbing, Kent, a member of the Savage family, and the son and heir of Sir Arnold Savage. Who died in 1374.

He was involved in the suppression of the Peasants' Revolt in 1381. He was appointed Sheriff of Kent for 1382 and 1386 and knighted in 1385. He was elected knight of the shire (MP) for Kent in 1390, 1391, 1401, 1402 and 1404, being elected speaker twice. He was constable of Queenborough Castle from 1393 to 1396 and deputy constable of Dover Castle. He was a member of the council of Henry IV from 1402 to 1406. He was an executor of John Gower's will.

He married Joan Eychingham, daughter of William Eychinham. On his death in 1410 he was buried at Bobbing church. He was succeeded by his son, also Arnold, who was also an MP for Kent. Their daughter Elizabeth Savage (died 1451) married Reynold Cobham, 4th Baron Cobham.

Political offices
Parliament of England
Preceded by John Doreward	Speaker of the House of Commons; 1400–1402	Succeeded by Sir Henry Redford
Preceded by Sir Henry Redford	Speaker of the House of Commons; 1403–1404	Succeeded by Sir William Esturmy
