= Henry Vane the Elder =

English politician

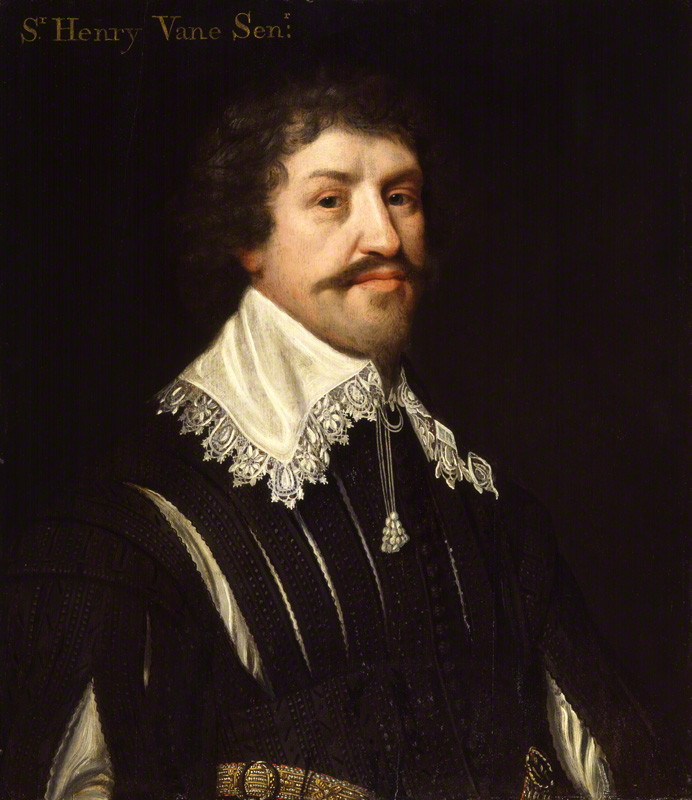
Sir Henry Vane

Arms of Vane: Azure, three sinister gauntlets (appaumée) or These are a difference of the arms of the Fane family, Earls of Westmorland from 1624, which show: three dexter gauntlets back affrontée, with identical tinctures

Sir Henry Vane (18 February 1589 – 1655), known as the Elder to distinguish him from his son, was an English politician who sat in the House of Commons at various times between 1614 and 1654. He served King Charles in many posts including secretary of state, but on the outbreak of the English Civil War joined the Parliamentary cause. He was the third cousin of Francis Fane, 1st Earl of Westmorland.

== Origins and education ==
Vane was the eldest son of Henry Vane or Fane of Hadlow, Kent, by his second wife, Margaret (daughter of Roger Twysden of East Peckham, Kent, and Anne Wyatt).

He matriculated at Brasenose College, Oxford, on 15 June 1604 and was admitted a student of Gray's Inn in 1606. He was knighted by James I on 3 March 1611.

== Political advancement ==
At the age of twenty-three he married Frances Darcy, daughter of Thomas Darcy of Tolleshunt D'Arcy, Essex. Immediately after his marriage, writes Vane in an autobiographical sketch, 'I put myself into court, and bought a carver's place by means of the friendship of Sir Thomas Overbury, which cost me £5,000.' Next year he devoted the £3,000 of his wife's portion to purchasing from Sir Edward Gorges a third part of the subpoena office in chancery, and later so ingratiated himself with the King that James gave him the reversion of the whole office for forty years.

In 1617, Sir David Foulis sold him the post of cofferer to Charles, Prince of Wales, and he continued to hold this office after Charles had become king. In about 1629 he became Comptroller of the Household in place of John Savile, 1st Baron Savile of Pontefract. Finally, in September 1639 he was made Treasurer of the Household.

Vane's career at court was interrupted by a quarrel with the George Villiers, 1st Duke of Buckingham, from whom he underwent 'some severe mortification' mentioned by Edward Hyde, 1st Earl of Clarendon, but he made his peace with Buckingham, and after Buckingham's death was in high favour with the Lord Treasurer, Lord Weston. In 1614, Vane was elected Member of Parliament for Lostwithiel. He was elected MP for Carlisle in 1621, and was re-elected in 1624, 1625 and 1626. However he took no important part in the debates of the House of Commons of England.

In February and again in September 1629, and in 1630, King Charles sent Vane to Holland in the hope of negotiating a peace between the United Provinces and Spain, and obtaining the restoration of the Electorate of the Palatinate by Spanish means. In September 1631, Vane was sent to Germany to negotiate with Gustavus Adolphus of Sweden. As King Charles merely offered the King of Sweden £10,000 per month, and expected him to pledge himself to restore the Palatinate, Gustavus rejected the proposed alliance. Vane's negotiations were also hindered by a personal quarrel with Gustavus, but he gave great satisfaction to his own master. Francis Cottington, 1st Baron Cottington wrote to Vane, "Through your wise and dexterous carriage of that great business, you have saved his majesty's money and his honour".

A letter from Sir Tobias Matthew to Vane, written about the same time, further testifies to Vane's favour at court. Clarendon, who is throughout the letter very hostile to Vane, describes him as a man 'of very ordinary parts by nature, and he had not cultivated them at all by art, for he was very illiterate. But being of a stirring and boisterous disposition, very industrious and very bold, he still wrought himself into some employment.'

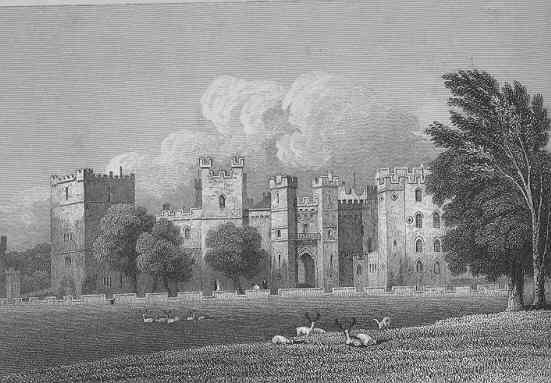
Raby Castle, which became the principal northern residence of Sir Henry Vane -— From Jones' Views of the Seats of Noblemen and Gentlemen, (1819).

Clarendon continues that for the office of controller and similar court offices, Vane was very fit, and if he had never taken other preferment he might probably have continued a good subject, for he had no inclination to change, and in the judgment he had liked the government both of church and state, and only desired to raise his fortune, which was not great, and which he found many ways to improve'.

Vane began life with a landed estate of £460 per annum; in 1640 he was the owner of lands worth £3,000 a year. He had sold his ancestral estate of Hadlow, and bought in its place Fairlawne in Kent, at a cost of about £4,000. He also purchased the seignories of Raby, Barnard Castle, and Long Newton in County Durham, at a cost of about £18,000.

Vane's political importance dates from 1630, when he became a member of the privy council. Sir Thomas Roe describes him about that time, in a letter to Elizabeth Stuart, Queen of Bohemia, as being 'of the cabinet', that is, one of those councillors in whom the King most confided. On 20 November 1632 he was appointed one of the commissioners of the admiralty. In May 1633 he entertained the King at Raby. In 1635 he was granted the wardenship of all forests and chases within the dominion of Barnard Castle, and in the following year the custody of Teesdale Forest and Manwood Chase.

On 10 April 1636 Vane was appointed one of the commissioners for the colonies, and between 1630 and 1640 he was continually employed on different administrative commissions. When the Bishops' Wars began in Scotland he was appointed one of the eight privy councillors to whom Scottish affairs were entrusted, and was one of the peace party in that committee. On 3 February 1640 the King, to the general surprise, appointed Vane secretary of state in place of Sir John Coke. This was effected, in spite of Lord Strafford's opposition, 'by the dark contrivance of the Marquis of Hamilton and by the open and visible power of the Queen.'

== Quarrel with Strafford ==
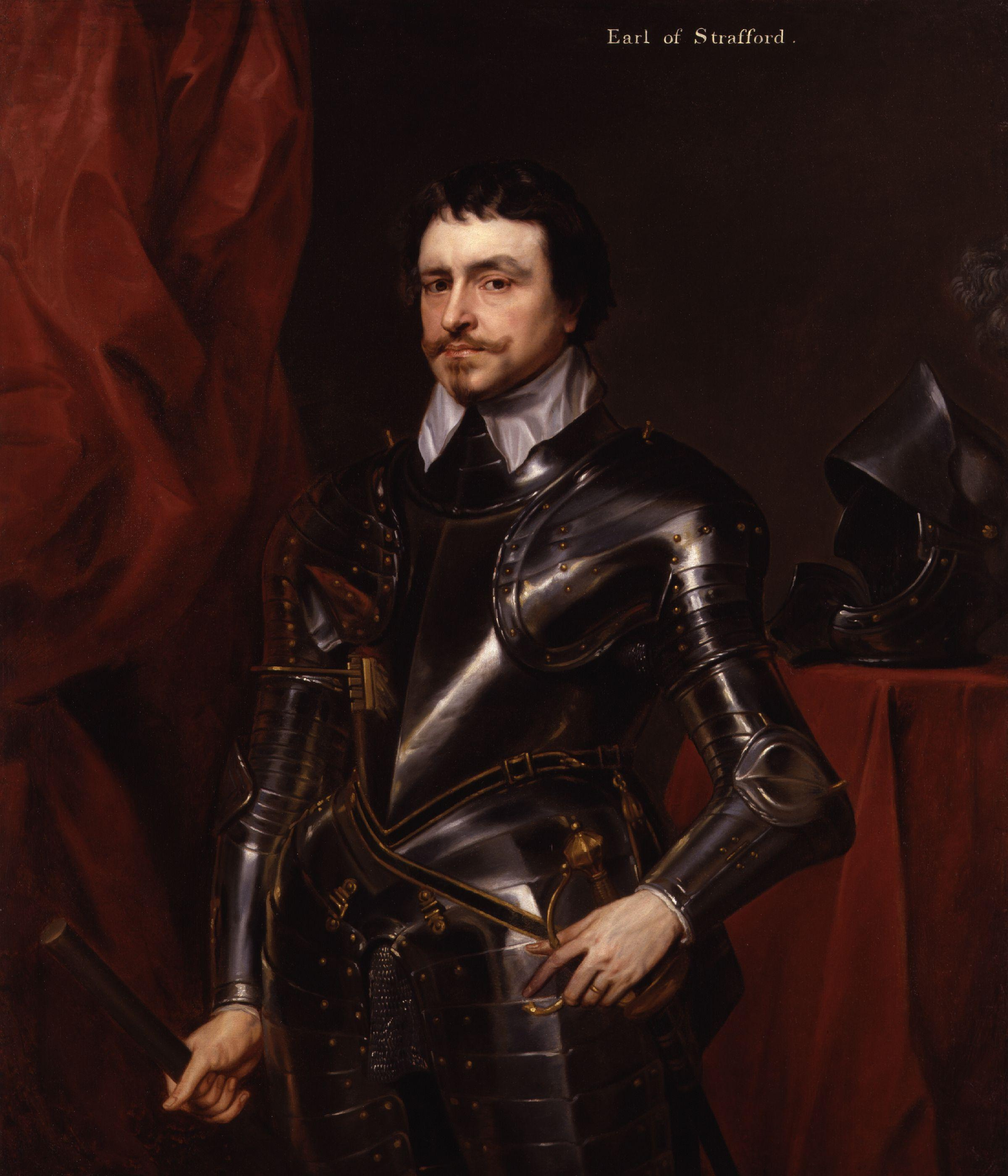
Portrait of Thomas Wentworth, 1st Earl of Strafford by van Dyck

The intimacy between Vane and Lord Hamilton dated from Vane's mission to Germany, and increased during the first Scottish war, when Vane was the intermediary between Hamilton and the King. Vane had been for some time on apparently friendly terms with Strafford, but the mismanagement of the war against the Scots, and differences as to the policy to be pursued towards them in the future, caused a breach. It became permanent when Strafford on his creation as an earl (12 January 1640) selected Baron Raby as his second title, ‘a house,' says Clarendon, ‘belonging to Sir H. Vane, and an honour he made an account should belong to him too.' This, continues Clarendon, was an act 'of the most unnecessary provocation' on Strafford's part, 'though he contemned the man with marvellous scorn . . . and I believe was the loss of his head'. (This slight was corrected in 1833, when Vane's descendant, the 1st Duke of Cleveland, was created Baron Raby alongside that dukedom.)

In April 1640, Vane was elected MP for Wilton in the Short Parliament. At the first meeting he was charged to demand supplies for the war from the commons. On 4 May he informed the house that the King was willing to surrender ship-money, adding that his master would not be satisfied with less than twelve subsidies in return. The debate showed that the King's demand would be refused, and led to the dissolution of Parliament on 5 May. Clarendon, who attributes the breach entirely to Vane's mismanagement, charges him with misrepresenting the temper of Parliament to the King, and even with "acting that part maliciously, and to bring all into confusion" in order to compass Strafford's ruin. Another contemporary rumour was that Vane brought about the dissolution in order to save himself from prosecution as a monopolist. But Vane was evidently acting by the King's instructions, and Clarendon omits to mention the dispute about the military charges and the intended vote against the Scottish war which complicated the question at issue. The King did not regard Vane as going beyond his orders, and continued to employ him as secretary. Throughout the second Scottish war Vane was with the King, and his letters show that he was full of confidence even after the defeat at the Battle of Newburn. Vane took part as an assistant in the debates of the great council and in the negotiations with the Scots at Ripon. He was re-elected MP for Wilton in November 1640 for the Long Parliament where he was fortunate enough to escape attack. This he owed partly to the fact that he had not been concerned in the most obnoxious acts of the government, partly to his son's connection with the opposition leaders.

In Strafford's trial Vane's evidence as to the words used by him in the meeting of the privy council on 5 May 1640 was of paramount importance. He asserted positively that Strafford had advised an offensive war with Scotland, telling the King, "You have an army in Ireland; you may employ it to reduce this kingdom." In the theory of the prosecution "this kingdom" meant England, not Scotland, and Vane declined to offer any explanation of the words, though much pressed by Strafford's friends. Other privy councillors present could not remember the words, but Vane persisted in his statement, relying doubtless on the notes of the discussion which he had taken at the time. The notes themselves had been seen by the King and burnt by his orders a short time before the meeting of the Parliament, but on 10 April John Pym produced a copy which he had obtained from the younger Vane, which corroborated the secretary's evidence. Vane owned the notes, but refused further explanations, and expressed great wrath with his son. Clarendon regards Vane's anger as a comedy played to deceive the public, but admits that for some time after "there was in public a great distance observed between them." There is no evidence, however, to justify either this theory of collusion, or the further statement that Vane had been throughout the trial the secret assistant of the prosecution.

== Dismissal by the King ==
Vane thought that Strafford's attainder would reconcile king and people. He commented "God send us now a happy end of our troubles and a good peace" on the passing of the bill. He did not see that it put an end to his prospects of remaining in the King's service, as its effects were for a time delayed by the difficulty of finding a suitable successor. He was even appointed one of the five commissioners of the treasury when William Juxon resigned in May 1641.

In August 1641 Vane accompanied Charles I to Scotland, and as no successor to Francis Windebank, his former colleague in the secretaryship, had yet been appointed, he was charged to correspond with (Sir) Edward Nicholas, clerk of the council. His letters during this period are printed in the ‘Nicholas Papers'. Although his post as treasurer of the household had already been promised to Thomas, 2nd Baron Savile (afterwards Earl of Sussex), he was confident that he should keep both it and the secretaryship. But as soon as Charles returned to London he gave the treasurership to Savile, and a few days later dismissed Vane from the secretaryship and all other posts at court (November 1641). It was remarked at the time that Vane had "the very ill luck to be neither loved nor pitied of any man," and the King was convinced of his treachery.

== Parliamentarian ==
Vane soon joined the opposition. On 13 December 1641 Pym moved that Vane's name should be added to the committee of thirty-two for Irish affairs. Two months later, when the militia bill was drawn up, Parliament nominated Vane as lord lieutenant of Durham (10 February 1642).

The English Civil War broke out later in 1642. Durham, which was predominantly Royalist in feeling, fell at once under the control of the Royalists, and Vane exercised no real authority there until after its reconquest at the end of 1644. John Lilburne, who was bitterly hostile to all the Vanes because Sir Henry had been one of his judges, accused him of causing the loss of Durham to the Royalists by negligence and treachery, but the charge met with no belief from Parliament.

Vane was a member of the Committee of Both Kingdoms from its first establishment (7 February 1644). In April 1645 he was employed as one of the Committee's representatives with the Scottish auxiliary army. At the Treaty of Uxbridge, Parliament asked the King to make Vane a baron. Vane enjoyed high favour with the Parliament, as shown by the ordinances for the payment of his losses during the war. These losses were very considerable, as Raby was three times occupied by the Royalists, and after its recapture became a parliamentary garrison. Vane claimed, probably with truth, "In my losses, plunderings, rents, and destructions of timber in my woods, I have been damnified to the amount of £16,000 at least".

Vane sat in the Rump Parliament after Pride's Purge in December 1648, but a proposal to appoint him a member of the English Council of State in February 1650 was rejected by the House. He was elected MP for Kent in the First Protectorate Parliament.

Vane died at the age of about 66 in or around May 1655. Royalists reported that he had committed suicide, through remorse for his share in Strafford's death. His widow, Frances, lady Vane, died on 2 August 1663, aged 72, and was buried at Shipbourne, Kent. Portraits of Vane and his wife were painted by Van Dyck.

== Issue ==
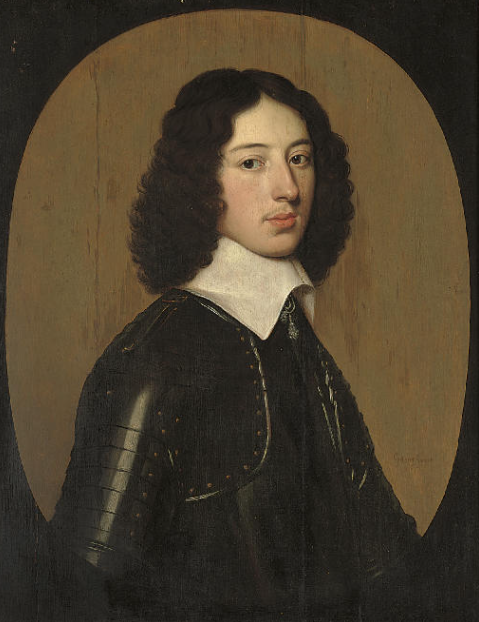
Portrait of his second son, Sir George Vane, by the circle of Gerrit van Honthorst

- Sir Henry (1613–1662), was a Puritan statesman, sixth colonial governor of Massachusetts, Secretary of the Navy, President of the Committee on Safety and one of the most significant leaders of the Long Parliament.
- George, the second son, born in 1618, was knighted on 22 November 1640. He was parliamentary High Sheriff of Durham in September 1645, and apparently treasurer of the committee for the county. Many of his letters to his father on the affairs of the county are printed in the calendar of domestic state papers. He married Elizabeth, daughter and heiress of Sir Lionel Maddison of Rogerly, Durham, and was buried at Long Newton in the same county on 1 May 1679.
- (3rd son's name?)
- Charles, the fourth son, matriculated at Magdalen College, Oxford, on 17 March 1637. On 16 January 1650 the parliament appointed him agent of the Commonwealth at Lisbon, in which capacity he demanded Prince Rupert's expulsion from Portuguese ports, but was obliged to leave and take refuge on board Blake's fleet.
- William was a soldier in Dutch service.
- Walter, knight, was also a soldier in the Dutch service. He seems to have been royalist in his sympathies, and a large number of intercepted letters from him to friends in England are printed in the 'Thurloe Papers.' In 1665 Charles II employed him as envoy to the elector of Brandenburg. Vane was colonel of a Regiment of Foot in the English service in 1667, and on 12 August 1668 was appointed colonel of what was known as the Holland regiment. He was killed serving under the Prince of Orange at the Battle of Seneffe in August 1674, and was buried at the Hague.
- Margaret married Sir Thomas Pelham, 2nd Baronet of Halland, Sussex.
- Frances married Sir Robert Honywood of Pett, Sussex.
- Anne married Sir Thomas Liddell of Ravensworth, Durham
- Elizabeth married Sir Francis Vincent of Stoke d'Abernon, Surrey.

== In fiction ==
In the alternate history 1632 Series, Vane appears in the short story "The Masque." King Charles read about his future execution in a book that is sent back in time (along with the entire town it's in). Vane flees England before he can be executed, and ends up serving in a government-in-exile along with Stafford. Upon reading about their future rivalry, Vane adopts the same attitude toward Stafford even though the circumstances leading to their original enmity have not yet happened and never will.

== Notes ==
Political offices
Preceded by Sir Francis Windebank; Sir John Coke	Secretary of State; 1640–1641 with Sir Francis Windebank in 1640	Succeeded by Sir Edward Nicholas
Parliament of England
Preceded by Sir Thomas Chaloner; Sir William Lower	Member of Parliament for Lostwithiel; 1614; With: Edward Leech	Succeeded by Edward Salter; George Chudleigh
Preceded by George Butler; Nathaniel Tomkins	Member of Parliament for Carlisle; 1621–1626; With: George Butler 1621–1622; Edward Aglionby 1624–1625; Richard Graham 1626	Succeeded by Richard Graham; Richard Barwis
Preceded by Framlingham Gawdy; Sir John Hobart, 2nd Baronet	Member of Parliament for Thetford; 1628; With: Edmund Moundeford	Parliament suspended until 1640
Vacant Parliament suspended since 1629	Member of Parliament for Wilton; 1640–1653; With: Sir Benjamin Rudyerd 1640–1648	Not represented in Barebones Parliament
Preceded by Viscount Lisle; Thomas Blount; William Kenrick; William Cullen; Andrew Broughton	Member of Parliament for Kent; 1654; With: Lieutenant Colonel Henry Oxenden; William James; Colonel John Dixwell; John Boys; Augustine Skinner; Lambert Godfrey; Colonel Richard Beal; Viscount Lisle; John Selliard; Colonel Ralph Weldon; Daniel Shatterden	Succeeded by Henry Oxenden; Richard Meredith; Sir Thomas Style; William James; Colonel John Dixwell; John Boys; Lambert Godfrey; Colonel Richard Beal; John Selliard; Colonel Ralph Weldon; Daniel Shatterden
