= Philip Sidney, 3rd Earl of Leicester =

English politician (1619–1698)

The Earl of Leicester MP, JP
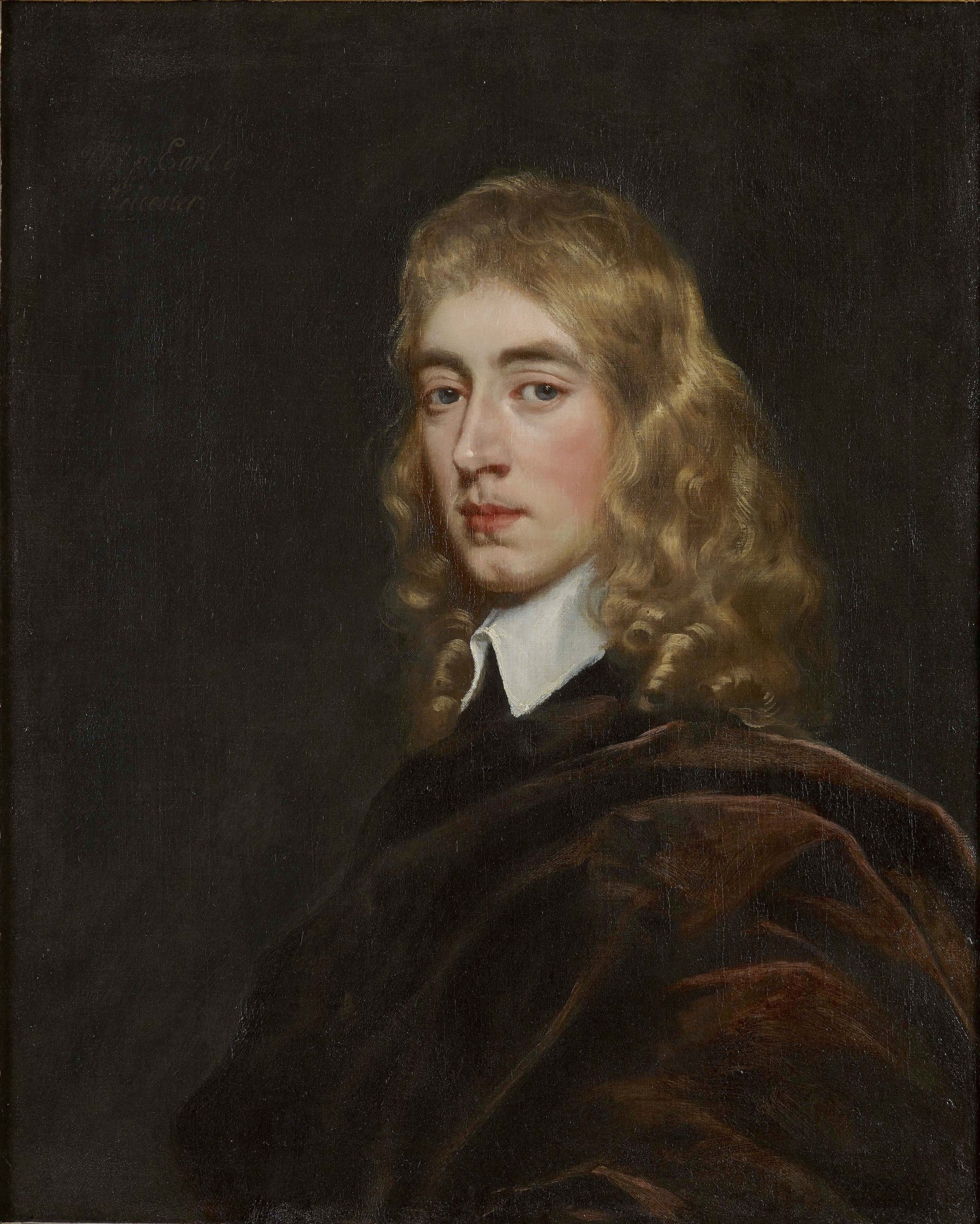
- Portrait by Peter Lely

Member of Parliament for Yarmouth (Isle of Wight)
- In office May 1659 – March 1660
- Monarch: Charles II

Member of Parliament for Isle of Wight
- In office September 1654 – January 1655

Member of Parliament for Kent
- In office July 1653 – December 1653

Lord Lieutenant of Ireland
- In office April 1646 – April 1647
- Monarch: Charles I

Member of Parliament for Yarmouth (Isle of Wight)
- In office November 1640 – April 1653

Member of Parliament for St Ives
- In office April 1640 – April 1640

Personal details
- Born: Philip Sidney; 10 January 1619 Baynard's Castle, London
- Died: 6 March 1698 (aged 79) Leicester House, Westminster
- Resting place: Penshurst Place
- Spouse: Lady Catherine Cecil (1628–1652)
- Children: At least 3, including Robert
- Education: Christ Church, Oxford
- Occupation: Politician and soldier

Military service
- Allegiance: England
- Branch/service: Infantry
- Years of service: 1642 to 1643
- Rank: Lieutenant-General
- Unit: Lord Lisle’s Regiment of Horse
- Battles/wars: Bishops Wars; Irish Confederate Wars

Philip Sidney, 3rd Earl of Leicester (10 January 1619 – 6 March 1698) was an English politician who sat in the House of Commons at various times between 1640 and 1659 and became Earl of Leicester in 1677. He supported the Parliamentarian cause in the Wars of the Three Kingdoms, when he was known as Viscount Lisle, a subsidiary title of the Earls of Leicester.

== Family background ==
Sidney was the son of Robert Sidney, 2nd Earl of Leicester, and his wife Dorothy Percy, daughter of Henry Percy, 9th Earl of Northumberland.

His younger brother Algernon Sydney fought for Parliament in the First English Civil War, denounced Oliver Cromwell as a tyrant, and was executed for treason in 1683 for alleged involvement in the Rye House Plot. Another brother, Henry Sydney (1641-1704), was a signatory of the 1688 Invitation to William, inviting him to remove James II of England from the throne.

== Career ==
In April 1640, he was elected Member of Parliament for Yarmouth, Isle of Wight in the Short Parliament. He was elected MP for both Yarmouth and St Ives for the Long Parliament in November 1640, and chose to sit for Yarmouth. He was Colonel of a Regiment of Horse in Ireland in 1641.

Lord Lisle supported the parliamentarian cause in the civil war and was Lord Lieutenant and Commander-in-Chief of Ireland from 1646 to 1647. He survived Pride's Purge in 1648 to sit in the Rump Parliament and was a councillor of state from 1648 to 1650. He was appointed a judge for the trial of King Charles I but declined to act. He was president of the council from 1651 to 1652. He was councillor of state and councillor to the lord protector in 1653. Also in 1653, he was elected MP for Kent in the Barebones Parliament. In 1654 he was elected MP for Isle of Wight, a constituency that only existed in the First Protectorate Parliament. He was appointed to Cromwell's "House of Lords" in 1658 under the designation "Lord Viscount Lisle". In 1659 he was returned to the House of Commons for the Restored Rump parliament.

On the restoration of King Charles II in 1660 Lord Lisle received a pardon. In 1677 he inherited the Earldom on the death of his father.

== Marriage and issue ==
Lord Lisle married Lady Catherine Cecil, daughter of William Cecil, 2nd Earl of Salisbury, and his wife Lady Catherine Howard, in 1645. Their children were Dorothy and Robert; the latter succeeded to his father's earldom.

An illegitimate daughter, Philadelphia Saunders, married Colonel John Shrimpton, later MP for Whitchurch, Hampshire and Governor of Gibraltar.

== Sources ==
- Hosford, David (2004). "Sidney, Henry, first earl of Romney". Oxford Dictionary of National Biography (online ed.). Oxford University Press. doi:10.1093/ref:odnb/25521. (Subscription, Wikipedia Library access or UK public library membership required.)
- Kelsey, Sean (2014). "Sidney, Philip, third earl of Leicester". Oxford Dictionary of National Biography (online ed.). Oxford University Press. doi:10.1093/ref:odnb/25523. (Subscription, Wikipedia Library access or UK public library membership required.)
- Scott, Jonathan (2004). "Sidney [Sydney], Algernon". Oxford Dictionary of National Biography (online ed.). Oxford University Press. doi:10.1093/ref:odnb/25519. (Subscription, Wikipedia Library access or UK public library membership required.)

Parliament of England
| Preceded by William Oglander; John Bulkeley | Member of Parliament for Yarmouth (Isle of Wight); 1640–1653; With: Sir John Leigh 1640–1648 | Succeeded by Not represented in Barebones Parliament |
| Preceded by William Dell; Sir Henry Marten | Member of Parliament for St Ives; 1640; With: Francis Godolphin | Succeeded by Francis Godolphin; Edmund Waller |
| Preceded by Augustine Skinner | Member of Parliament for Kent; 1653; With: Thomas Blount; William Kenrick; William Cullen; Andrew Broughton | Succeeded by Lieutenant Colonel Henry Oxenden William James; Colonel John Dixwell; John Boys; Sir Henry Vane (senior); Lambert Godfrey; Colonel Richard Beal; Augustine Skinner; John Selliard; Colonel Ralph Weldon Daniel Shatterden |
| Preceded by Constituency not in existence | Member of Parliament for Isle of Wight; 1654; With: William Sydenham | Succeeded by Constituency not continued |
| Preceded by John Sadler; Richard Lucy | Member of Parliament for Yarmouth (Isle of Wight); 1659–1660; With: Sir John Leigh 160 | Succeeded by Edward Smythe; Richard Lucy |
Peerage of England
| Preceded by Robert Sidney | Earl of Leicester; 1677–1698 | Succeeded by Robert Sidney |
| Preceded by Robert Sidney | Baron Sydney (descended by acceleration); 1677–1689 | Succeeded by Robert Sidney |
Political offices
| Preceded by Viscount Ormonde | Lord Lieutenant of Ireland; 1646–1647 | Succeeded by Viscount Ormonde |
