= John Boys (Parliamentarian) =

English politician

John Boys (c. 1607 – 21 October 1678) was an English politician who sat in the House of Commons at various times between 1645 and 1656.

Boys was born at Betteshanger, Kent. the son of Edward Boys. He was educated at Canterbury and Winchester. He was admitted to Sidney Sussex College, Cambridge on 22 July 1623 aged 16, and was admitted at Gray's Inn on 1 November 1626.

In 1645, Boys was elected Member of Parliament for Kent in the Long Parliament. He was elected MP for Kent again in 1654 for the First Protectorate Parliament and 1656 for the Second Protectorate Parliament.

Boys died in 1678 and had a monument at Betteshanger.

Parliament of England
| Preceded by Sir John Colepeper; Augustine Skinner | Member of Parliament for Kent; 1645–1648; With: Augustine Skinner | Succeeded by Augustine Skinner |
| Preceded by Viscount Lisle; Thomas Blount; William Kenrick; William Cullen; Andrew Broughton | Member of Parliament for Kent; 1654–1656; With: Lieutenant Colonel Henry Oxenden 1654–1656; William James 1654–1656; Colonel John Dixwell 1654–1656; Lambert Godfrey 1654–1656; Colonel Richard Beal 1654–1656; John Selliard 1654–1656; Colonel Ralph Weldon 1654–1656; Daniel Shatterden 1654–1656; Augustine Skinner 1654; Sir Henry Vane (senior) 1654; Sir Thomas Style, 2nd Baronet 1656; Richard Meredith 1656 | Succeeded by Sir Thomas Style, 2nd Baronet; William James |
