= Lambert Godfrey =

English politician

Lambert Godfrey (born 1611) was an English politician who sat in the House of Commons between 1654 and 1659.

Godfrey was the eldest son of Thomas Godfrey, of Sellinge, Kent. He matriculated at Hart Hall, Oxford on 4 May 1627, aged 16 and was awarded BA on 19 February 1628. He was incorporated at Cambridge University in 1628 and called to the bar at Gray's Inn in 1636.

In 1654, Godfrey was elected Member of Parliament for Kent in the First Protectorate Parliament. He was re-elected MP for Kent in 1656 for the Second Protectorate Parliament. In 1659 he was elected MP for New Romney in the Third Protectorate Parliament.

Parliament of England
Preceded by Viscount Lisle; Thomas Blount; William Kenrick; William Cullen; Andrew Broughton	Member of Parliament for Kent; 1654–1656; With: Lieutenant Colonel Henry Oxenden 1654–1656; William James 1654–1656; Colonel John Dixwell 1654–1656; Ralph Weldon 1654–1656; Colonel Richard Beal 1654–1656; John Selliard 1654–1656; John Boys 1654–1656; Daniel Shatterden 1654–1656; Augustine Skinner 1654; Sir Henry Vane (senior) 1654; William James 1656; Richard Meredith 1656	Succeeded by Sir Thomas Style, 2nd Baronet; William James
Preceded by Not represented in Second Protectorate Parliament	Member of Parliament for New Romney; 1659; With: Sir Robert Honywood	Succeeded by Not represented in Restored Rump
