= Augustine Skinner =

English politician

Skinner's Estate Act 1660
- Act of Parliament
- Parliament of England
- Long title: An Act for enabling Augustine Skynner and Wm. Skynner to make Sale of some Lands, for Payment of Debts.
- Citation: 12 Cha. 2. c. 11 Pr.
- Territorial extent: England and Wales

Dates
- Royal assent: 13 September 1660
- Commencement: 25 April 1660 (Note: Start of session.)

Status: Current legislation

Augustine Skinner (c. 1594 – 11 June 1672) was an English politician who sat in the House of Commons variously between 1642 and 1659. He took the Parliamentary side during the English Civil War.

Skinner was of Tutsham Hall at West Farleigh in Kent and belonged to a newly arrived rather than established Kent family (his ancestors being from Devon). In 1642, he was elected Member of Parliament member for Kent the Long Parliament. He supported parliament in the Civil War and was sufficiently orthodox in his support to survive Pride's Purge. He refused to accept appointment as a Commissioner in the trial of the King. After the expulsion of the Rump Parliament he represented Kent again in the Parliament of 1654, and in the restored Rump in 1659. He was an active justice of the peace throughout the Commonwealth period, and it was said that Cromwell had great confidence in him as a magistrate.

Skinner borrowed money to buy two manors which had been confiscated from the Bishop of Rochester; when these were restored to their original ownership at the Restoration, he found himself heavily in debt. His brother William was in similar difficulties, and together they procured a private act of Parliament, Skinner's Estate Act 1660 (12 Cha. 2. c. 11 Pr.), to allow them to sell other lands to raise funds, Skinner's seat at Tutsham Hall being sold to one Edward Goulston. Skinner was still unable to meet his obligations and, being arrested for debt, he eventually died in the Fleet Prison in 1672, aged 78. He was buried at West Farleigh.

Skinner made two good marriages, to Elizabeth Twisden, daughter of Serjeant-at-Law Richard Braithwaite, and to Ann Franklin, daughter of Thomas Franklin, an Alderman of the City of London; but his only son, also called Augustine (born 1618), lived less than a year, so that his heir was his brother, William.

== Notes ==
Parliament of England
Preceded by Sir John Colepeper; Sir Edward Dering	Member of Parliament for Kent; 1642–1653; With: Sir John Colepeper 1642–1644; John Boys 1645–1648	Succeeded by Viscount Lisle; Thomas Blount; William Kenrick; William Cullen; Andrew Broughton
Preceded by Viscount Lisle; Thomas Blount; William Kenrick; William Cullen; Andrew Broughton	Member of Parliament for Kent; 1654; With: Lieutenant Colonel Henry Oxenden; William James; Colonel John Dixwell; John Boys; Sir Henry Vane (senior); Lambert Godfrey; Colonel Richard Beal; Viscount Lisle; John Selliard; Colonel Ralph Weldon; Daniel Shatterden	Succeeded by 11 members
Preceded by Sir Thomas Style; William James	Member of Parliament for Kent; 1659–1660	Succeeded by Sir Edward Dering; Sir John Tufton
