= Ralph Weldon (politician) =

Ralph Weldon (baptised 1606 – 1676) was an English politician who sat in the House of Commons from 1654 to 1656. He fought in the Parliamentary army in the English Civil War.

Weldon was the son of Sir Anthony Weldon of Swanscombe, Kent. He was admitted at Jesus College, Cambridge on 24 November 1620. He became a commander in the Parliamentary Army at Taunton, Somerset, and took part in the siege of Bristol in 1645. He gave up his command to become Governor of Plymouth in 1645.

In 1654, Weldon was elected Member of Parliament for Kent in the First Protectorate Parliament and was re-elected MP for Kent in 1656 for the Second Protectorate Parliament.

Parliament of England
Preceded by Sir John Colepeper; Augustine Skinner	Member of Parliament for Kent; 1645–1648; With: Augustine Skinner	Succeeded by Augustine Skinner
Preceded by Viscount Lisle; Thomas Blount; William Kenrick; William Cullen; Andrew Broughton	Member of Parliament for Kent; 1654–1656; With: Lieutenant Colonel Henry Oxenden 1654–1656; William James 1654–1656; Colonel John Dixwell 1654–1656; Lambert Godfrey 1654–1656; Colonel Richard Beal 1654–1656; John Selliard 1654–1656; John Boys 1654–1656; Daniel Shatterden 1654–1656; Augustine Skinner 1654; Sir Henry Vane (senior) 1654; William James 1656; Richard Meredith 1656	Succeeded by Sir Thomas Style, 2nd Baronet; William James
