= Sir Richard Meredith, 2nd Baronet =

English politician

Sir Richard Meredith, 2nd Baronet (died 1679) was an English politician who sat in the House of Commons from 1656 to 1659.

Meredith was the second, but eldest surviving, son of Sir William Meredith, 1st Baronet of Leeds Abbey, Kent and his wife Susanna Barker of London. He was born between 1621 and 1630. He was educated at Queens' College, Cambridge, from Easter term 1647 onward and admitted at Gray's Inn on 10 March 1649.

Meredith began his career as a Cromwellian administrator in Ireland about the early 1650s and was in charge of a garrison responsible for the public safety of seventeen nearby localities and an outpost at Liscoway, Co Sligo.

Upon his return to England, Meredith married Susannah Skippon youngest daughter of Philip Skippon, of Foulsham, Norfolk, at Acton, Middlesex, on 8 April 1655. This Philip Skippon was a professional soldier who fought in Utrecht in 1623, governor of Bristol in 1645 and briefly held the most senior military command in Ireland in 1647. Although sometimes showing royalist tendencies, it suited a firm Presbyterian revolutionary like Skippon to allow his daughter to marry a Parliamentarian like Meredith. This placed Meredith at odds with many in his own family.

His father's cousin Reverend Richard Meredith (1597-1655) of Hellesden near Norwich in Norfolk, son of Edward Meredith (d.1643) and Elizabeth Lane (d.1644), named him in a will dated about 1655/56.

During the Interregnum, Meredith served in Parliament. He was the elected Member of Parliament for Kent in the Second Protectorate Parliament from 1656 until 1658. In 1659 he was elected MP for the Cinque Port of Sandwich in the Third Protectorate Parliament.

In 1659, Meredith claimed title over the townland of Ballyonaghan in the parish of Kilshalvy, Co Sligo. Such people claiming lands were called titulados, many of whom did not live in the districts they claimed, but opportunisticly sought to acquire land confiscated from earlier holders. No previous evidence has been found to suggest any other Meredith had been associated with lands in the county, yet the claim reflects Meredith's knowledge of the county through his service there earlier that decade. However subsequent claims in 1680, the year after Meredith's death, suggest his 1659 claim did not carry forward to his offspring.

Upon the Restoration in 1660, Meredith was relegated as keeper of the volary at Whitehall. When regaining the throne, Charles II had established the royal household at the palace of Whitehall and commissioned a sizeable aviary, known as a volary, immediately beside his apartments. Both the king's mistress Barbara Villiers (c.1640-1709), countess of Castlemaine, and his Spanish wife Catherine of Braganza also had volaries close to their Whitehall apartments. The countess maintained her marriage with Roger Palmer, earl of Castlemaine, a nephew of Meredith's paternal grandmother Jane Palmer, wife of Sir William Meredith of Stansty. Nearby rooms were ascribed to John Granville (1628-1701), husband of Meredith's cousin Jane Wyche. Soon after the establishment of the king's volary in Whitehall, its keeper Richard Meredith petitioned for compensation for the financial hardship faced since his appointment. He claimed he had been kept in the volary since it was erected and forced to make numerous disbursements, including an unpaid amount for which he had been imprisoned. He further claimed twelve pounds of unpaid salary. He petitioned for financial satisfaction to rescue him from financial ruin.

In about 1634, an Irish landowner Teige O'Connor-Sligo had mortgaged his Co Sligo lands to wealthy Galway merchant Patrick French, a grandson of O'Connor-Sligo's sister Una. Being related in this way, French was a member of the same derbfine and he and his subsequent descendants could claim part-ownership under those terms. O'Connor-Sligo's cumulative debts reduced the net value of his holdings, which enticed the lord deputy of Ireland Thomas Wentworth to force the outright sale of the estate and override French's mortgages. O'Connor-Sligo's son, also called Teige, quietly retook the estate upon Wentworth's execution in 1641, but Wentworth's relation and former secretary Sir George Radcliffe claimed rightful ownership. Within a short time, the O'Connors-Sligo and Frenches were displaced about 1653 in favour of the disbanded Parliamentary soldiers, returned royalists and the descendants of Wentworth and his party. Patrick French's extensive landholdings in Co Sligo, including those at Sessuecommon specifically, were redistributed among Richard Coote Lord Collooney, Thomas Radcliffe and Sir Philip Perceval. After the confiscations, French was granted 6000 acres of land at Dungar, later known as Frenchpark, in Co Roscommon and lived there from 1656 until 1659. His will dated 1 August 1659 was proved in 1671. He died in 1667 at the age of 86 years and was buried in the Dominican Abbey at Cloonshanville, near Frenchpark, Co Roscommon. His vault, located near the belfry, bears his family's coat of arms and the inscription 'Pray for the soul of Patrick French Fitz-Stephen, of Galway, burgess, who lived in this world eighty-six years'. Patrick French had two daughters of interest. Daughter Rebecca married firstly in 1647 with John Waterhouse of Dublin and secondly in 1653/54 with Thomas ffolliott of Ballyshannon, so may have been born about 1627. Another daughter, of unknown name but perhaps similar age to Rebecca, had a son Francis in the early 1650s by the administrator Richard Meredith. Regardless of illegitimacy, the child Francis Meredith was therefore among the gelfine and derbfine of Patrick French of Sessuecommon, and was eligible under Brehonic law to claim title to part of his lands if the French claim had not been nullified by the land confiscations imposed under English law.

In 1667, the year of Patrick French's death, Richard Meredith received the townland of Sessuecommon, Co Sligo, under fee farm grant from Richard Coote Lord Collooney, who had received title to much of Co Sligo confiscated from Irish owners. The grant included Sessuecommon's six subdivisions, namely Sessuecommon, Toniart, Ballyglass, Frenchford, Barney and Bronra, once held by Meredith's son Francis's maternal grandfather Patrick French. Obviously Coote favoured Meredith by using English laws to reflect what Brehonic laws would have allowed in the absence of confiscations. Francis's descendants retained the holding at least another 200 years. Tweedy (1956) claimed his family held evidence of this grant until at least 1854.

Some years after the Restoration, Meredith received an official pardon about 1671, presumably for either his activities during the Interregnum or his 1655 marriage with the Parliamentarian Skippon family.

On 19 January 1674/75, Charles II ordered Richard Jones (1640/41-1711), Lord Viscount Ranelagh, to unconditionally pay two thousand pounds sterling to Richard Meredith, then living in London, for services given in Ireland. The warrant directed Jones to make the payment by 24 June 1676. This Richard Jones, Lord Viscount Ranelagh, was the son of Arthur Jones, 2nd Viscount Ranelagh, and his wife Catherine Boyle. Catherine's sister Dorothy married a nephew of John Vaughan, second husband of Meredith's paternal grandmother Jane Palmer. The warrant is stored among the correspondence of Sir William Harbord, chief secretary for Ireland. As deputy to the Lord Lieutenant, he held the most pivotal office in the British administration in Ireland and was influential at the parliament in Westminster. Sir William was replaced in 1676 by Meredith's cousin Sir Cyril Wyche (c.1632-1707), who served as a privy councillor in Ireland about the same time as did Richard Jones, Lord Viscount Ranelagh.

Meredith's father died in 1675, at which time Meredith succeeded to the baronetcy and lived at Leeds Castle. He died in 1679 and was buried at Leeds Church on 5 September 1679. Richard Meredith did not leave a will. His widow Susannah died at Leeds Abbey in 1721, leaving a will proved at Canterbury.

By his wife Susannah, Meredith had six sons and five daughters, but evidence suggests the eldest was born about 1666, some eleven years after their marriage. His sons William (c.1666-1681), Richard (a certified lunatic, died 1723) and Roger (1674-1738) succeeded successively to the baronetcy. Roger and another son Thomas were also Members of Parliament.

Richard Meredith's offspring from his legitimate children died out in the male line in 1738 and all lines in 1758, but those descended from his illegitimate son Francis continue into the twenty-first century.

As the eldest surviving son of an eldest surviving son, Meredith bore arms similar to those of his paternal grandfather Sir William Meredith of Stansty. Their blazon is described as Azure a lion rampant or. The arms borne by the early Merediths of Co Sligo are similar but use the tincture argent instead of or, a typical signal of illegitimacy. The Ulster King of Arms granted arms in 1899 to Henry Colpoys Tweedy (1847-1917) of Cloonamahon, husband of heiress Alice Maud Meredith, which included a quarter described as Azure, a lion rampant per pale argent and or to represent her Meredith ancestral line. This design combined the two tinctures. The Ulster King of Arms noted the Merediths of Co Sligo used and bore unofficial arms which were not recorded in his office.

Parliament of England
Preceded by Henry Oxenden; William James; John Dixwell; John Boys; Sir Henry Vane; Lambert Godfrey; Richard Beal; Augustine Skinner; John Selliard; Ralph Weldon; Daniel Shatterden	Member of Parliament for Kent; 1656–1658; With: Henry Oxenden; Sir Thomas Style, Bt; William James; John Dixwell; John Boys; Lambert Godfrey; Richard Beal; John Selliard; Ralph Weldon; Daniel Shatterden	Succeeded by William James; Sir Thomas Style, Bt
Preceded by James Thurban	Member of Parliament for Sandwich; 1659	Succeeded by Not represented in the restored Rump
Baronetage of England
Preceded by William Meredith	Baronet (of Stansty); 1675–1679	Succeeded by William Meredith
