= Kent Militia =

Auxiliary force of the British Army

The Kent Militia was an auxiliary (Note: It is incorrect to describe the British Militia as 'irregular': throughout their history they were equipped and trained exactly like the line regiments of the regular army, and once embodied in time of war they were fulltime professional soldiers for the duration of their enlistment.) military force in the county of Kent in South East England. From their formal organisation as Trained Bands in 1558 until their final service as the Special Reserve, the Militia regiments of the county served in home defence in all of Britain's major wars. They also saw active service during the Second Boer War, and trained thousands of reinforcements during World War I. After a shadowy postwar existence they were formally disbanded in 1953.

== Early history ==
The English militia was descended from the Anglo-Saxon Fyrd, the military force raised from the freemen of the shires under command of their Sheriff. The universal obligation to serve continued under the Norman and Plantagenet kings and was reorganised under the Assizes of Arms of 1181 and 1252, and again by the Statute of Winchester of 1285. The men were arrayed by the Hundreds into which each county was divided. Under this statute 'Commissioners of Array' would levy the required number of men from each shire. The usual shire contingent was 1000 infantry commanded by a millenar, divided into companies of 100 commanded by centenars or ductores, and subdivided into platoons of 20 led by vintenars. The coastal towns of Kent forming part of the Cinque Ports also had a legal obligation to supply ships, seamen and marines for the Royal Navy.

== Kent Trained Bands ==
Under the later Tudors the legal basis of the militia was updated by two acts of 1557 covering musters (4 & 5 Ph. & M. c. 3) and the maintenance of horses and armour (4 & 5 Ph. & M. c. 2), which placed the county militia under a Lord Lieutenant appointed by the monarch, assisted by the Deputy Lieutenants and Justices of the Peace. The entry into force of these Acts in 1558 is seen as the starting date for the organised county militia in England.

Although the militia obligation was universal, it was clearly impractical to train and equip every able-bodied man, so after 1572 the practice was to select a proportion of men for the Trained Bands, who were mustered for regular drills. When war broke out with Spain training and equipping the militia became a priority. From 1583 counties were organised into groups for training purposes, with emphasis on the invasion-threatened 'maritime' counties including Kent. In 1584, Kent had 2500 trained men, of which 1000 were equipped with firearms, 500 with bows and 1000 were 'corslets' (armoured pikemen).

=== Armada ===
The Armada Crisis in 1588 led to the mustering of the trained bands in April and they were called out on 23 July as the Armada approached. Kent produced 7124, of whom 4166 were untrained. Kent was threatened on its southern, eastern and northern coasts and its force was divided into eastern and western divisions at Maidstone and Canterbury respectively. Two thousand of the Kent trained men were sent to join the main Royal army at St James's Palace in London, and 4000 foot and 725 horse were to be sent into the neighbouring county of Sussex if the Spanish landed there. But the Armada was defeated at sea and was unable to land any troops: the trained bands were stood down shortly afterwards.

=== Bishops' Wars ===
With the passing of the threat of invasion, the trained bands declined in the early 17th Century. Later, King Charles I attempted to reform them into a national force or 'Perfect Militia' answering to the king rather than local control. In 1638 the Kent regiments were organised by 'lathes' (the ancient groups of Hundreds into which Kent was subdivided): Aylesford (Rochester, Maidstone and Tonbridge areas); St Augustine Lathe (Canterbury, Sandwich and Dover areas); Scray Lathe (Ashford area); Shepway Lathe (Folkestone, Hythe and New Romney areas) and Sutton-at-Hone Lathe (Dartford and Sevenoaks areas), together with one company from the City of Canterbury. These totalled 2910 musketeers, 1757 corslets, and 293 horse.

The trained bands including the Kent contingent were called out in both 1639 and 1640 for the Bishops' Wars. In 1639 the county was ordered to select 1200 men for Sir Thomas Morton's Regiment of Foot in the Marquess of Hamilton's army, which was to make an amphibious landing in Scotland. But the best men were kept for coastal defence and most of those who actually went were untrained and badly equipped hired or 'pressed' substitutes, the men and arms described as 'utterly unserviceable'. Morton's Regiment took part in the abortive expedition, suffering serious casualties from an outbreak of smallpox before the army was dispersed to its homes. Kent's quota in 1640 was another 700, not including the Cinque Ports' 300, to be sent by sea to join the army assembling on the Scottish border. Kent however was notably uncooperative and the numbers had to be made up with pressed men.

=== Civil War ===
Control of the trained bands was one of the major points of dispute between Charles I and Parliament that led to the English Civil War. However, with a few exceptions neither side made much use of the trained bands during the war beyond securing the county armouries for their own full-time troops, many of whom were recruited from the trained band ranks. However, the Kent Trained Bands were often called out and as the war dragged on the county organised Auxiliary Trained Bands to allow rotation of units on duty. They also raised units of volunteers for service outside the county. Each of the five lathes organised an auxiliary regiment and a regiment of horse:

The London Trained Bands helped the Kentish authorities to put down a rising at Sevenoaks and Tonbridge in the summer of 1643. The Sutton at Hone TB Volunteers were represented in the Parliamentary army that relieved the Siege of Gloucester and fought the First Battle of Newbury on their return, and a number of Kentish TB units joined the Sir William Waller's Southern Association army for the successful Siege of Arundel from December 1643 to January 1644. Later in 1644 the Aylesford TB Volunteers were at the inconclusive Second Battle of Newbury. After attending a rendezvous at Romsey, Kentish troops may have been involved in the Siege of Basing House, which surrendered in October 1645.

Although the New Model Army was kept in being after the First Civil War ended in 1646, Parliament disbanded its local forces and the Trained Bands were again the main military force to deal with local uprisings. An outbreak in Canterbury at Christmas 1647 was quelled by the St Augustine Volunteers. However, the trial of those arrested led to further protests in May 1648, which former Royalist officers turned into an organised revolt, sparking off the Second English Civil War. The Royalists seized numerous towns in Kent and the Prince of Wales landed at Sandwich to put himself at the head of the rebellion. Many of the gentleman of Kent joined and trained bandsmen could not be relied upon, but Sir Thomas Fairfax led the New Model Army into the county and defeated the Royalists at the Battle of Maidstone on 1 June.

Once Parliament had re-established full control it passed new Militia Acts in 1648 and 1650 that replaced lords lieutenant with county commissioners appointed by Parliament or the Council of State. At the same time the term 'Trained Band' began to disappear in most counties. Under the Commonwealth and Protectorate the militia received pay when called out, and operated alongside the New Model Army to control the country. Large numbers of Trained Band units were called out across England in 1650 during the Scottish invasion of the Third English Civil War, including those of Kent. Twistleton's Kent Dragoons were ordered to join a concentration at Oxford, before the Scots army was defeated at the Battle of Worcester.

== Kent Militia ==
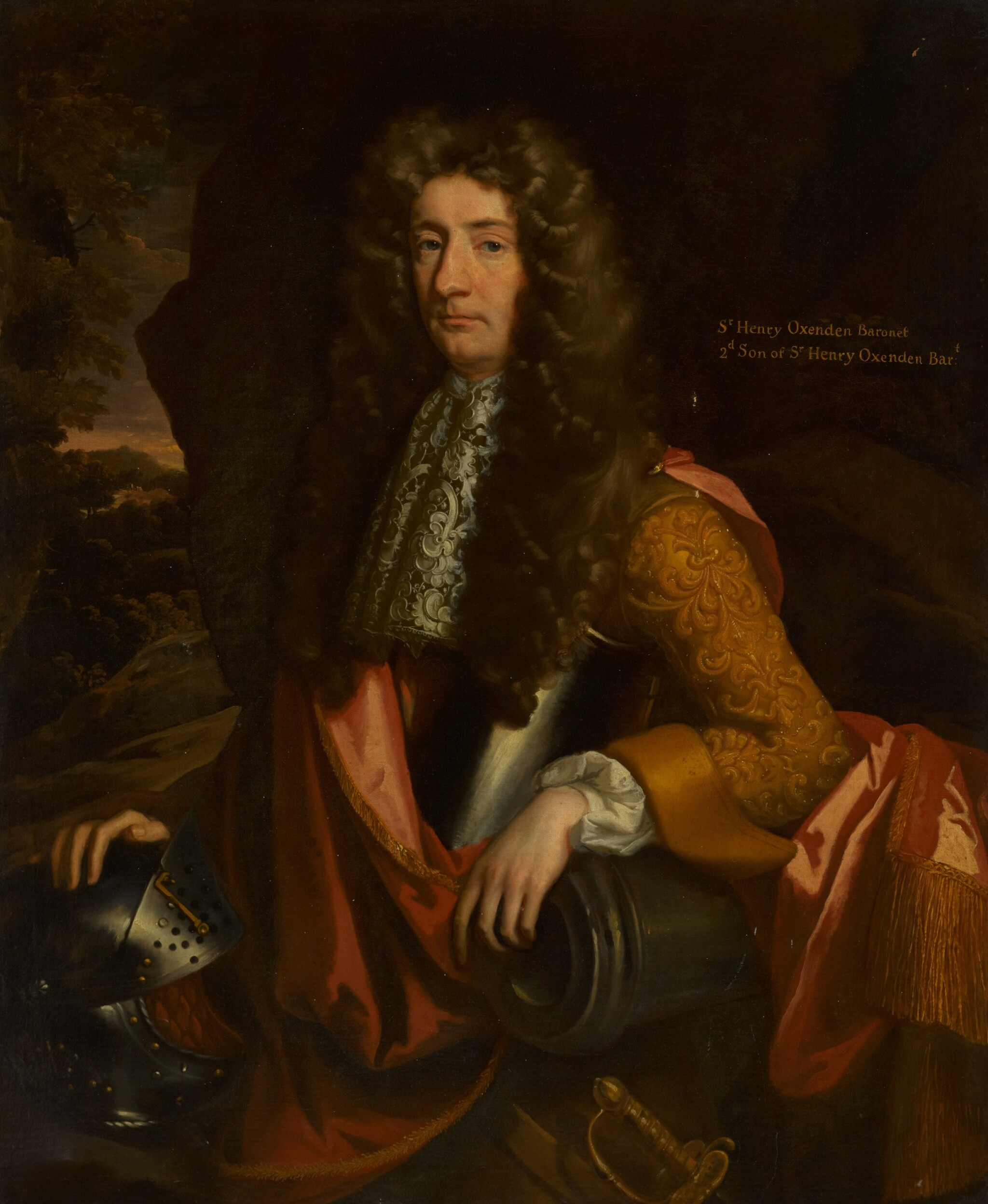
Sir Henry Oxenden, who was a colonel in the Kent Militia in 1697

After the Restoration of the Monarchy, the English Militia was re-established by The King's Sole Right over the Militia Act 1661 under the control of the king's lords-lieutenant, the men to be selected by ballot. This was popularly seen as the 'Constitutional Force' to counterbalance a 'Standing Army' tainted by association with the New Model Army that had supported Cromwell's military dictatorship, and almost the whole burden of home defence and internal security was entrusted to the militia.

=== Dutch wars ===
In 1666, Charles II called out the Kent Militia to defend against a threatened Dutch and French invasion (the Second Dutch War), and in September that year it sent a contingent to help fight the Great Fire of London. The militia were again assembled in May 1667, Kent supplying its men with a month's pay. In June the Dutch fleet suddenly appeared off Deal, and 160 townsmen turned out in two hours to help the embodied militia company. The Dutch fleet then sailed into the Thames Estuary and detached a squadron to carry out a Raid on the Medway, with the aim of damaging the ships and dockyard facilities. Its first task was to suppress the coast defences at Sheerness, where Garrison Point Fort was only partly built. The fort contained 16 guns manned by a small detachment of permanent gunners assisted by seamen from HMS Monmouth, and a company of Douglas's Regiment, all under the command of the Governor, Vice-Admiral Sir Edward Spragge. When intelligence of the Dutch approach was received, a company of West Kent Militia was added to the garrison, bringing it to a strength of about 250 men. The Dutch squadron appeared off the entrance to the River Medway at about 17.00 on 10 June and three ships of the line engaged Garrison Point Fort while a force of about 800 soldiers and marines under an English renegade, Colonel Thomas Dolman, was landed from small boats. After about an hour's firing by the warships, nine of the fort's guns had been knocked out, and Spragge ordered the survivors of the garrison to evacuate the damaged fort and withdraw up the Medway to Gillingham. The Dutch now controlled the river below Chatham and Rochester, and proceeded to burn Sheerness Dockyard and the laid-up warships at anchor, towing away the flagship, HMS Royal Charles, as a prize. The other forts prevented the Dutch ships from proceeding further up the Medway or Thames, so they withdrew on 22 June, having completely demolished Garrison Point Fort.

In May 1672, on the outbreak of the Third Dutch War, the Lord Lieutenant of Kent, Heneage Finch, 3rd Earl of Winchilsea, warned of the danger of invasion before the Royal Navy could be fully mobilised, and set up a system of guards along the coast. He had the whole county militia ready to march at an hour's notice, and hoped to be given command of any regular troops in the county. Again, the whole militia of England was called out to repel a possible invasion after the Battle of Beachy Head in 1690.

Armour was going out of use and the militia were not otherwise supplied with uniforms. The acting Lord Lieutenant of Kent, the Duke of Richmond, caused an upset among taxpayers in Kent in 1668 when he directed that the Kent Militia should abandon armour and the men were to have red soldiers' coats down to the knees, lined with black (which would show at the turned back collars and cuffs), except his own regiment, which was to be clothed in yellow. By 1684 militia captains throughout the country were directed to provide cavalry with a buff coat and infantry with a coat of one colour.

In 1697 the Kent Militia (independent of the Cinque Ports) consisted of six regiments:

- Sutton-at-Hone Regiment
- St Augustine Regiment
- Aylesford Regiment
- Shepway Regiment
- Scray Regiment
- City of Canterbury Regiment

These totalled 37 companies of Foot (3550 men) and four Troops of Horse (231 men). Among the colonels were Sir Stephen Lennard, 2nd Baronet, Henry Oxenden, Sir Philip Boteler, 3rd Baronet, Sir Francis Head, 2nd Baronet and Henry Lee. However, musters and training were in decline: in Kent there were complaints that the various troops and companies had never been mustered simultaneously, allowing men to appear in more than one unit, making them seem stronger than they actually were.

The Militia passed into virtual abeyance during the long peace after the Treaty of Utrecht in 1712, although a few counties were called out during the Jacobite Rising of 1745. In Kent, which hourly expected a French invasion in support of the Jacobites in December 1745, all that could be done was for the Deputy Lieutenants to ask anyone willing to fight to assemble with whatever arms they had – a reversion to the shire levy or posse comitatus.

=== Seven Years War ===
Under threat of French invasion during the Seven Years' War a series of Militia Acts from 1757 re-established county militia regiments, the men being conscripted by means of parish ballots (paid substitutes were permitted) to serve for three years. There was a property qualification for officers, who were commissioned by the lord lieutenant. Kent was given a quota of 960 men to raise. The militia was strongly supported by the Sackvilles, one of Kent's leading families, and despite several anti-militia riots in the county (at one point Major-General Lord George Sackville was besieged at Knole Park by an angry mob) the West Kent Militia was quickly formed at Maidstone. The regiment's weapons were issued from the Tower of London on 20 November 1758 when it had reached 60 per cent of its establishment strength – one of the first units in the country to achieve this. It was embodied for fulltime service on 23 June 1759. The East Kent Militia followed in 1760, but was not embodied for fulltime service during the war. The regiment only served in Kent during the Seven Years War, with detachments guarding French prisoners of war. It was disembodied in December 1762 as the war was ending and reverted to a peacetime training routine.

=== War of American Independence ===
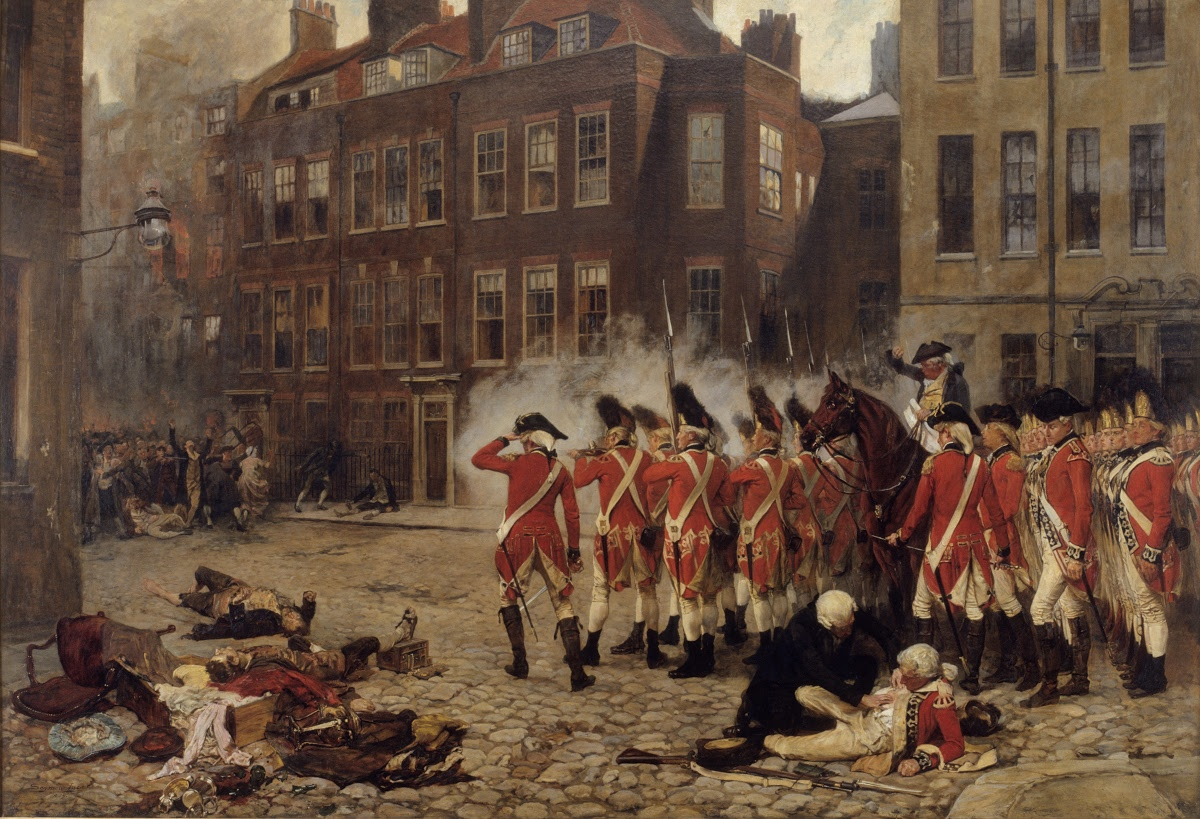
Soldiers deployed to the Gordon Riots, depicted in the 1879 painting The Gordon Riots by John Seymour Lucas.

The militia was called out after the outbreak of the War of American Independence when the country was threatened with invasion by the Americans' allies, France and Spain. Both regiments of Kent Militia were embodied on 31 March 1778. That summer the regiments went into camp, training alongside other Militia and Regular regiments. The East Kent was at Warley Camp in Essex, the West Kents at Winchester, Hampshire, and as the senior regiment in camp (see Precedence below) provided the King's Guard when George III visited on 28 September. The militia then alternated between winter quarters and summer camps. The West Kents were at Warley in 1779 and was then billeted in Essex and Hertfordshire. At the end of May 1780 it was ordered to Portsmouth for the sumer, but diverted to Tottenham and Highgate, north of London, to assist in quelling the Gordon Riots in the city.

The militia was stood down at the conclusion of the war and from 1784 to 1792 the regiments were supposed to assemble for 28 days' annual training, even though to save money only two-thirds of the men were actually called out each year.

=== French Revolutionary and Napoleonic Wars ===
The militia was already being embodied when Revolutionary France declared war on Britain on 1 February 1793. The French Revolutionary Wars saw a new phase for the English militia: they were embodied for a whole generation, and became regiments of full-time professional soldiers (though restricted to service in the British Isles), which the regular army increasingly saw as a prime source of recruits. They served in coast defences, manning garrisons, guarding prisoners of war, and for internal security, while their traditional local defence duties were taken over by the Volunteers and mounted Yeomanry.

In a fresh attempt to have as many men as possible under arms for home defence in order to release regulars, the Government created the Supplementary Militia, a compulsory levy of men to be trained in their spare time, and to be incorporated in the Militia in emergency. Kent's quota was fixed at 1873 men, and a third regiment was formed, though this seems to have been short-lived.

The war ended with the Treaty of Amiens in March 1802 and all the militia were stood down. However, the Peace of Amiens was short-lived and the regiments, whose training commitment had been increased from 21 to 28 days a year, were called out again in 1803. Legislation passed in 1798 and 1811 permitted English militia regiments to serve in Ireland for two years, and both Kent Militia regiments spent periods there.

=== Local Militia ===
While the Militia were the mainstay of national defence during the Revolutionary and Napoleonic Wars, they were supplemented from 1808 by the Local Militia, which were part-time and only to be used within their own districts. These were raised to counter the declining numbers of Volunteers, and if their ranks could not be filled voluntarily the Militia Ballot was employed. Meetings of the Kent Lieutenancy to set up the Local Militia were held at the Bell Inn at Maidstone in April 1809 and the Lord Lieutenant of Kent (Earl Camden) began issuing commissions to officers in the new regiments:

- Cranbrook and Woodsgate Regiment of Local Militia, Earl Camden as Colonel, 16 May 1809
- Chatham and Dartford Regiment of Local Militia, the Earl of Darnley as Lieutenant-Colonel Commandant, 16 May 1809
- Bearsted and Malling Regiment of Local Militia, Viscount Marsham as Lt-Col Cmdt, 16 May 1809
- Ashford Regiment of Local Militia, George Finch-Hatton as Lt-Col Cmdt, 16 May 1809; became 1st East Kent or Ashford, Oldcastle and Elham Regiment by January 1810
- Sevenoaks and Bromley Regiment of Local Militia, Lord Whitworth as Lt-Col Cmdt, 7 August 1809
- 2nd East Kent or Lath of Scray and Wingham Regiment of Local Militia, Lt-Gen George Harris as Col, 9 November 1809
- Blackheath Regiment of Local Militia, Sir Thomas Maryon-Wilson, 7th Baronet, as Lt-Col Cmdt, 22 February 1810

Viscount Marsham, who had just succeeded his father as Earl of Romney, resigned and Lt-Col Hon John Wingfield-Stratford was appointed to replace him as Commandant of the Bearsted and Malling Regiment on 4 April 1811

The 19-year-old George Sackville, 4th Duke of Dorset, was commissioned as captain of the Sevenoaks and Bromley Regiment on 27 April 1813, then on 26 July the same year he was promoted to Lt-Col Cmdt after Viscount Whitworth resigned.

The Cranbrook and Woodsgate Regiment had become the Weald of Kent Regiment by March 1814.

=== Waterloo and after ===
The militia was disembodied at the end of the Napoleonic War and the Local Militia Ballot was suspended and their remaining permanent staff were paid off. The West Kent Militia was embodied again in June 1815 during the short Waterloo Campaign. They were finally disembodied in May 1816.

After Waterloo there was another long peace. Although officers continued to be commissioned into the militia and ballots were still held, the regiments were rarely assembled for training and the permanent staffs of sergeants and drummers (who were occasionally used to maintain public order) were progressively reduced.

== 1852 Reforms ==
The Militia of the United Kingdom was revived by the Militia Act 1852, enacted during a renewed period of international tension. As before, units were raised and administered on a county basis, and filled by voluntary enlistment (although conscription by means of the Militia Ballot might be used if the counties failed to meet their quotas). Training was for 56 days on enlistment, then for 21–28 days per year, during which the men received full army pay. Under the Act, Militia units could be embodied by Royal Proclamation for full-time home defence service in three circumstances:

1. 'Whenever a state of war exists between Her Majesty and any foreign power'.
2. 'In all cases of invasion or upon imminent danger thereof'.
3. 'In all cases of rebellion or insurrection'.

The West Kent regiment was designated West Kent Light Infantry in March 1853.

=== Kent Militia Artillery ===
The 1852 Act introduced Artillery Militia units in addition to the traditional infantry regiments. Their role was to man coastal defences and fortifications, relieving the Royal Artillery (RA) for active service. The Kent Militia Artillery with six batteries was raised at Dover in May 1853.

The Artillery Militia was reorganised into 11 divisions of garrison artillery in 1882, and the Kent unit became the 2nd Brigade, Cinque Ports Division, RA. When the Cinque Ports Division was abolished in 1889 the title was altered to Kent Artillery (Eastern Division) RA.

=== Crimean War and after ===
War having broken out with Russia in 1854 and an expeditionary force sent to the Crimea, the militia began to be called out for home defence. The East Kent Militia was embodied by June 1854 and in 1855 it volunteered for overseas garrison service, being sent to Malta for a year. The West Kent LI was embodied in January 1855 and served in Ireland. The Kent Militia Artillery was also embodied in January 1855 and served in the Dover defences. After the war the militia was disembodied in June and July 1856.

The East Kents were among the small number of militia regiments embodied during the Indian Mutiny, again serving at Portsmouth and Woolwich from December 1857. In March 1860 it was sent to Weymouth, where it guarded convicts at Portland Prison working on the stone breakwaters of Portland Harbour. It was disembodied in June 1860.

Thereafter the militia regiments were only assembled for their annual training.

== Cardwell and Childers reforms ==
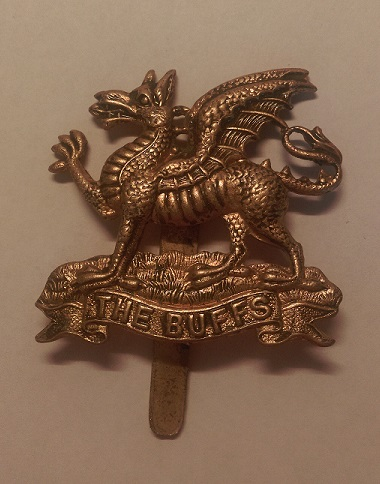
Cap badge of the Buffs (East Kent Regiment).

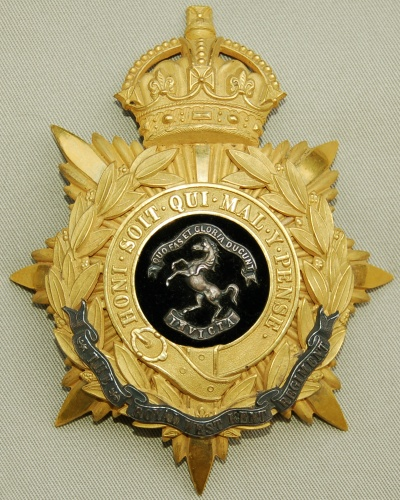
Officer's helmet Plate of the Queen's Own (Royal West Kent Regiment), 1902-1914.

Under the 'Localisation of the Forces' scheme introduced by the Cardwell Reforms of 1872, militia regiments were brigaded with their local regular and Volunteer battalions. Kent was divided into two Sub-Districts:

- Sub-District No 45 (County of Kent) at Canterbury
  - 1st and 2nd Battalions, 3rd (East Kent) Regiment of Foot (The Buffs)
  - East Kent Militia
- Sub-District No 46 (County of Kent) at Maidstone
  - 50th (Queen's Own) Regiment of Foot
  - 97th (The Earl of Ulster's) Regiment of Foot
  - West Kent Light Infantry

It was intended that each sub-district would have two regular and two militia battalions, so both the East and West Kents formed 2nd Battalions in 1876.

The militia now came under the War Office rather than their county lords lieutenant. Around a third of the recruits and many young officers went on to join the regular army. The Childers Reforms of 1881 completed the Cardwell process by converting the linked regular regiments into county regiments and incorporating the militia battalions into them:

- East Kent Militia became 3rd and 4th Bns, Buffs (East Kent Regiment)
- West Kent Light Infantry became 3rd and 4th Bns, Queen's Own (Royal West Kent Regiment) (50th/97th)

Although the 2nd Bn East Kent Militia was designated as the 4th Buffs, it was only at cadre strength, and was absorbed by the 1st Bn (now 3rd Buffs) in 1888. The two militia battalions of the Royal West Kents were similarly amalgamated in 1894.

The 3rd Bn Buffs was embodied from 9 March to 30 September 1885 during the Panjdeh Crisis.

=== Second Boer War ===
After the disasters of Black Week at the start of the Second Boer War in December 1899, most of the regular army was sent to South Africa, and many militia units were embodied to replace them for home defence and to garrison certain overseas stations. Some were then permitted to volunteer for active service in South Africa. The 3rd Buffs was embodied on 18 January 1900 and after volunteering were sent to South Africa in March. It saw a good deal of action in the Orange Free State and in the pursuit of Christiaan de Wet, then spent most of 1901 as convoy escorts and to man the lines of blockhouses. The 3rd Buffs were relieved and embarked in January 1902 for Saint Helena where they spent a further six months guarding Boer prisoners of war. The battalion was finally disembodied on 17 July 1902.

3rd Battalion of the West Kents also volunteered and served in garrison in Malta.

The Kent Artillery was embodied from 3 May to 13 October 1900. Although the unit volunteered for overseas service it was not accepted, though some officers did serve in South Africa as volunteers.

== Special Reserve ==
After the Boer War, the future of the Militia was called into question. There were moves to reform the Auxiliary Forces (Militia, Yeomanry and Volunteers) to take their place in the six Army Corps proposed by the Secretary of State for War, St John Brodrick. However, little of Brodrick's scheme was carried out. Under the more sweeping Haldane Reforms of 1908, the Militia was replaced by the Special Reserve (SR), a semi-professional force whose role was to provide reinforcement drafts for regular units serving overseas in wartime, rather like the earlier Militia Reserve.

The battalions became the 3rd (Reserve) Battalion, Buffs (East Kent Regiment) and 3rd (Reserve) Battalion, Queen's Own (Royal West Kent Regiment) respectively. The Artillery Militia was disbanded.

=== World War I ===
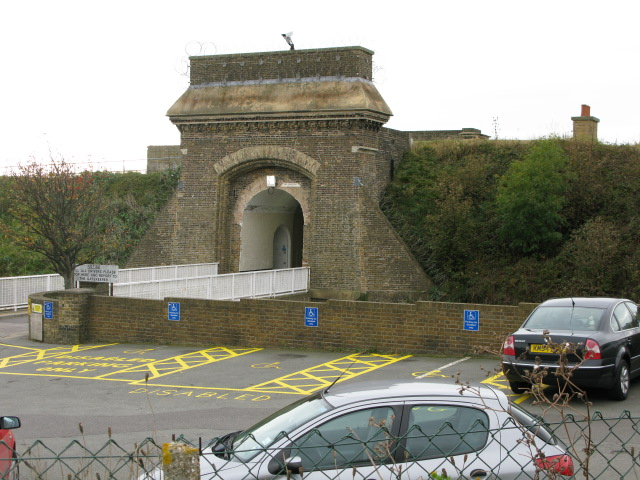
The Citadel at Dover, base of the 3rd (Reserve) Bn Buffs throughout World War I.

On the outbreak of World War I the two battalions were embodied and went to their war stations at Dover (Buffs) and Chatham (West Kents). As well as defence tasks, their role was to equip the Reservists and Special Reservists of their regiments and send them as reinforcement drafts to the Regular battalions serving overseas. Once the pool of reservists had dried up, the 3rd Bns trained thousands of raw recruits for the active service battalions, and reserve battalions were established alongside them to carry out the same role for the 'Kitchener's Army' battalions. They continued this role until after the Armistice with Germany and were disembodied in 1919.

=== Postwar ===
The SR resumed its old title of Militia in 1921 but most militia units remained in abeyance after World War I. By the outbreak of World War II in 1939, no officers remained listed for either Kent battalions. The Militia was formally disbanded in April 1953.

== Precedence ==
During the War of American Independence the counties were given an order of precedence determined by ballot each year. For the Kent Militia the positions were:

- 12th on 1 June 1778
- 4th on12 May 1779
- 36th on 6 May 1780
- 27th on 28 April 1781
- 23rd on 7 May 1782

The militia order of precedence balloted for in 1793 (Kent was 1st) remained in force throughout the French Revolutionary War: this covered all the regiments in the county. Another ballot for precedence took place at the start of the Napoleonic War, when Kent was 57th.This order continued until 1833. In that year the King drew the lots for individual regiments and the resulting list remained in force with minor amendments until the end of the militia. The regiments raised before the peace of 1763 took the first 47 places (West Kent was 37th); presumably because the East Kents were not embodied until 1778, it was placed in the second group as 49th. Formally, the regiments became the '37th, or West Kent Militia' and '49th, or East Kent Militia'. While most militia regiments paid little attention to the numeral, the West Kents did incorporate the number '37' into their insignia.

== See also ==
- Militia (English)
- Militia (Great Britain)
- Militia (United Kingdom)
- Special Reserve
- Kent Trained Bands
- West Kent Light Infantry
- East Kent Militia
- Kent Militia Artillery
- Buffs (Royal East Kent Regiment)
- Queen's Own Royal West Kent Regiment
