= Sir Thomas Style, 2nd Baronet =

English politician

Sir Thomas Style, 2nd Baronet (1624–1702) was an English politician who sat in the House of Commons between 1656 and 1659.

Style was the son of Sir Thomas Style, 1st Baronet of Wateringbury, Kent and his wife Elizabeth Foulkes daughter of Robert Foulkes of Monchesning, Essex. His father was High Sheriff of Kent in 1634.

In 1656, Style was elected Member of Parliament for Kent in the Second Protectorate Parliament. He was re-elected MP for Kent in the Third Protectorate Parliament.

Style died at the age of 78.

Style married firstly Elizabeth Airmine, daughter of Sir William Airmine, 1st Baronet and secondly Margaret Twisden, daughter of Sir Thomas Twisden, 1st Baronet. He was succeeded by his son Oliver by his first wife who died a few months after. Oliver was succeeded by his half-brother Thomas.

Parliament of England
Preceded by Henry Oxenden; William James; John Dixwell; John Boys; Sir Henry Vane (senior); Lambert Godfrey; Richard Beal; Augustine Skinner; John Selliard; Ralph Weldon; Daniel Shatterden	Member of Parliament for Kent; 1656–1659; With: William James; Sir Richard Meredith, 2nd Baronet 1656; Henry Oxenden 1656; John Dixwell 1656; John Boys 1656; Lambert Godfrey 1656; Richard Beal 1656; John Selliard 1656; Ralph Weldon 1656; Daniel Shatterden 1656	Succeeded by Augustine Skinner
Baronetage of England
Preceded by Thomas Style	Baronet (of Wateringbury); 1637–1702	Succeeded by Oliver Style
