= Kent Trained Bands =

Auxiliary force of the British Army

- Active: 1572–1662
- Country: England
- Branch: Trained Bands
- Role: Infantry and Cavalry
- Size: 6 Regiments + 6 Auxiliary Regiments
- Engagements: First Bishops' War; Relief of Gloucester; First Battle of Newbury; Siege of Arundel; Second Battle of Newbury

The Kent Trained Bands were a part-time military force recruited from Kent in South East England, organised from earlier levies in 1572. They were periodically embodied for home defence and internal security, including the Spanish Armada campaign in 1588, and saw active service during the Wars of the Three Kingdoms. They were replaced by the Militia in 1662.

== Early history ==
The English militia was descended from the Anglo-Saxon Fyrd, the military force raised from the freemen of the shires under command of their Sheriff. The universal obligation to serve continued under the Norman and Plantagenet kings and was reorganised under the Assizes of Arms of 1181 and 1252, and again by the Statute of Winchester of 1285. The men were arrayed by the Hundreds into which each county was divided. Under this statute 'Commissioners of Array' would levy the required number of men from each shire. The usual shire contingent was 1000 infantry commanded by a millenar, divided into companies of 100 commanded by centenars or ductores, and subdivided into platoons of 20 led by vintenars. The coastal towns of Kent forming part of the Cinque Ports also had a legal obligation to supply ships, seamen and marines for the Royal Navy.

Under the later Tudors the legal basis of the militia was updated by two acts of 1557 covering musters (4 & 5 Ph. & M. c. 3) and the maintenance of horses and armour (4 & 5 Ph. & M. c. 2), which placed the county militia under a Lord Lieutenant appointed by the monarch, assisted by the Deputy Lieutenants and Justices of the Peace. The entry into force of these Acts in 1558 is seen as the starting date for the organised county militia in England.

== Trained Bands ==
Although the militia obligation was universal, it was clearly impractical to train and equip every able-bodied man, so after 1572 the practice was to select a proportion of men for the Trained Bands, who were mustered for regular drills. The traditional site for musters in Kent was at Muster Oak in Codsheath Hundred. The government aimed for 10 days' training a year, with a two-day national 'general muster' at Michaelmas, and two 'special musters' lasting four days for detailed training at Easter and Whitsun. In the early years of Queen Elizabeth I's reign the nationwide musters only occurred roughly every four years, and from 1578 the special musters were reduced to two days each. When war broke out with Spain training and equipping the militia became a priority. From 1583 counties were organised into groups for training purposes, with emphasis on the invasion-threatened 'maritime' counties including Kent. In 1584, Kent had 2500 trained men, of which 1000 were equipped with firearms, 500 with bows and 1000 were 'corslets' (armoured pikemen).

== Spanish War ==
The Armada Crisis in 1588 led to the mustering of the trained bands in April, when the Lord Lieutenant of Kent reported 10,866 able-bodied men, of whom 2953 were trained. The trained bands were put on one hour's notice in June and called out on 23 July as the Armada approached. Those actually mobilised in Kent numbered 7124, of whom 4166 were untrained. These included 64 'lances' (heavy cavalry), 80 light horse, 84 'petronel's (the petronel was an early cavalry firearm) and 300 'argolets' (a French style of light cavalry). Kent was the most vulnerable county, threatened on its southern, eastern and northern coasts. The force in the county was divided into eastern and western divisions based at Maidstone and Canterbury respectively. Two thousand of the Kent trained men were sent to join the main Royal army at St James's Palace in London, and 4000 foot and 725 horse were to be sent into the neighbouring county of Sussex if the Spanish landed there. But the Armada was defeated at sea and was unable to land any troops: the trained bands were stood down shortly afterwards.

In the 16th century little distinction was made between the militia and the troops levied by the counties for overseas expeditions, and Kent supplied levies almost every year from 1589. However, the counties usually conscripted the unemployed and criminals rather than the Trained Bandsmen – in 1585 the Privy Council had ordered the impressment of able-bodied unemployed men, and the Queen ordered 'none of her trayned-bands to be pressed'. Replacing the weapons issued to the levies from the militia armouries was a heavy cost on the counties.

== Stuart reform ==
With the passing of the threat of invasion, the trained bands declined in the early 17th century. Later, King Charles I attempted to reform them into a national force or 'Perfect Militia' answering to the king rather than local control. In 1638 the Kent regiments were organised by 'lathes' (the ancient groups of Hundreds into which Kent was subdivided):

- Aylesford Lathe, recruited from the Rochester, Maidstone and Tonbridge areas
- St Augustine Lathe, recruited from the Canterbury, Sandwich and Dover areas
- Scray Lathe, recruited from the Ashford area
- Shepway Lathe, recruited from the Folkestone, Hythe and New Romney areas
- Sutton-at-Hone Lathe, recruited from the Dartford and Sevenoaks areas
- City of Canterbury, one company

These totalled 2910 musketeers, 1757 corslets, and 293 horse.

== Bishops' Wars ==
The trained bands were called out in 1639 and 1640 for the Bishops' Wars. In February 1639 the Lord Lieutenant of Kent, the Earl of Pembroke, was ordered to select 1200 of the Trained Bands for Sir Thomas Morton's Regiment of Foot in the Marquess of Hamilton's army, which was to make an amphibious landing in Scotland. The Kent contingent, drawn from all of the regiments, assembled at Gravesend in April, delayed by a lack of partizans. But the best men were kept for coastal defence and most of those who actually went were untrained and badly equipped hired or 'pressed' substitutes, the men and arms described as 'utterly unserviceable'. On 16 April the men embarked on a convoy of small ships to Harwich, where they were joined by the Essex Trained Bands contingent for Morton's Regiment. The regiment landed on the island of Inchcolm in the Firth of Forth, but in May it was re-embarked and sailed back to Holy Island on 28 May, after which it marched to join the main Royal army at Berwick-upon-Tweed. By May Morton's Regiment had already lost 100 men to smallpox. After a stand-off with the Covenanters between Birks and Dun Law in June, the army was dispersed to its homes.

Kent's quota for the 1640 campaign was 700, not including the Cinque Ports' 300, to be sent by sea to join the army assembling on the Scottish border. Kent however was notably uncooperative and Sir Humfrey Tufton could not persuade the yeomen and farmers amongst the trained bandsmen to go to Scotland, and the numbers had to be made up with pressed men.

== Civil Wars ==
Control of the trained bands was one of the major points of dispute between Charles I and Parliament that led to the English Civil War. However, with a few exceptions neither side made much use of the trained bands during the war beyond securing the county armouries for their own full-time troops, many of whom were recruited from their ranks. However, the Kent Trained Bands were often called out and as the war dragged on the county organised units of Auxiliary Trained Bands to allow rotation of units on duty. They also raised units of volunteers for service outside the county. Each of the five lathes organised an auxiliary regiment and a regiment of horse:

- Aylesford Lathe Trained Band – Colonel Sir Francis Barnham, MP, later Col Mark Dixwell and Col John Dixwell, MP
- Aylesford Lathe Auxiliaries – existed by May 1645; Col William Kendrick
- Aylesford Lathe Volunteers – Col George Newman
- Aylesford Lathe Horse – active 1643–45, Col Sir John Sedley
- St Augustine Lathe Trained Band – Col Sir George Sondes, MP (1639), imprisoned as a Royalist 1645
- St Augustine Lathe Auxiliaries
- St Augustine Lathe Volunteers – active 1643–47
- St Augustine Lathe Horse – Sir Richard Hardres
- Scray Lathe Trained Band – Col Sir Edward Hales, 1st Baronet (1639), later Col Richard Hardy
- Scray Lathe Auxiliaries – Col William Herbert
- Scray Lathe Horse
- Shepway Lathe Trained Band – Col Sir Humphrey Hales
- Shepway Lathe Auxiliaries – being formed December 1644–July 1645; Col John Browne
- Shepway Lathe Horse
- Sutton-at-Hone Lathe Trained Band – Col Sir Francis Walsingham (1639), later Col Thomas Blunt
- Sutton-at-Hone Lathe Auxiliaries – Col William Boothby
- Sutton-at-Hone Lathe Volunteers – Sir William Brooke
- Sutton-at-Hone Lathe Horse – Sir John Rivers
- City of Canterbury Company – Sir Francis Tufton

Colonels Henry Honeywood and Oxenden are also known to have been colonels in the Kent TBs at this time.

Open warfare between the King and Parliament broke out in the autumn of 1642. After the Parliamentarian Army, supported by the London Trained Bands (LTBs), had blocked the Royalist army's advance on London at the Battle of Turnham Green on 13 November, there was a plan to send three regiments of the LTBs to Blackheath to join the Kentish TBs to protect Kent from the King's Army. In the event the Royalists withdrew up the Thames Valley and the concentration was not needed.

Kent was well within the area controlled by Parliament, but in the summer of 1643 there was a rising in the county – nominally Royalist, but including local troublemakers. For a week from 18 July armed bands took control of Tonbridge and Sevenoaks, plundering the houses of rich Parliamentarians and taking the militia weapons stored at them. The insurrectionists threatened the Thames Estuary and the Port of London with cannon stripped from Parliamentary ships. Sir John Rivers of the Sutton at Hone Horse was involved in negotiating with the rebels. Regular and LTB regiments under Maj-Gen Richard Browne were sent down from London to support the Kentish forces, and the insurgents retreated to Tonbridge. There was a three-hour skirmish at Hildenborough outside the town on 24 July, in which Browne claimed to have captured 200 rebels. The London troops left on 29 July, when 'Hercules Holliland' (Note: Probably the Scottish officer Hercules Holland.) was appointed Sergeant Major General of the Trained Bands in Kent.

By now Kent had begun organising regiments of Auxiliaries to share the duties with the Kentish TBs (in emulation of the LTB Auxiliaries) and units of Volunteers willing to serve for short periods outside Kent. The Sutton at Hone Volunteers marched with regiments of the LTBs in Parliament's expedition to relieve the Siege of Gloucester, which was achieved on 8 September 1643. On the return march the Royalists blocked the Parliamentary army's way at Newbury. In fighting their way through the Trained Bands distinguished themselves at the First Battle of Newbury on 20 September, but the colonel of the Sutton at Hone Volunteers, Sir William Brooke, subsequently died of the wounds received in the battle.

After resisting association for some time, Kent became part of Parliament's 'Southern Association' in November 1643, with Sir William Waller as commander of its forces. That month the second-in-command of the Sutton at Hone Volunteers, Lt-Col Ralph Weldon, raised a regular regiment of Foot for the Association, known as the Kentish Regiment. Waller began his campaign in November with an attack on Basing House, and then the Battle of Alton (13 December). After Alton the LTB regiments in his army (which had already performed over a month's service) refused to move against Arundel Castle, with many shouting 'Home! Home!', and the brigade then marched home.

However, a number of Kentish regiments were represented in Waller's army at the Siege of Arundel from 19 December 1643 to 6 January 1644:

- Aylesford TB
- Scray TB
- Scray Auxiliaries
- Sutton at Hone Volunteers
- Sutton-at-Hone Auxiliaries
- St Augustine Horse
- Scray Horse
- Shepway Horse

Colonel Mark Dixwell of the Aylesford TB probably died at the siege. His younger brother John Dixwell, later MP for Dover and Governor of Dover Castle, who was a Captain in 1646, afterwards took over command of the regiment and held it in 1650.

A replacement LTB brigade under Browne marched from London on 5 January, delayed by its accompanying Troop of Kentish Horse which refused to march until specifically ordered by the authorities in London. The brigade reached Guildford and was then delayed by bad weather before joining Waller. It is not clear whether this was a troop of Trained Band horse, or one of the five troops of Sir Michael Livesay's Kentish Horse, raised (like Weldon's Kentish Foot) by the Southern Association as regulars for general service, probably with a cadre of men from the TBs. (These two regiments were already in Waller's army and later served under him at the Battles of Cheriton (29 March 1644) and Cropredy Bridge (29 June 1644).)

In the autumn of 1644, having defeated the Royalist armies in the North of England at the battle of Marston Moor, Parliament concentrated three armies including Waller's in the South. This resulted in the inconclusive Second Battle of Newbury on 27 October, at which the Aylesford Volunteers were represented.

After the Battle of Naseby in 1645, Parliament's New Model Army advanced into the West Country, and Kent was ordered to send its forces to assist, including 80 horse and 160 dragoons, to the West Country, with the horse joining a rendezvous at Romsey. Kentish troops may have been involved in the final Siege of Basing House, which surrendered in October.

Although the New Model Army was kept in being after the First Civil War ended in 1646, Parliament disbanded its local forces and the Trained Bands were again the main military force to deal with local uprisings. At Christmas 1647 there was an outbreak in Canterbury against Parliament's ban on festivities. The St Augustine Volunteers quelled the riot, and in January 1648, one company of the St Augustine Auxiliaries remained in garrison in the city. However, the trial of those arrested led to further protests in May 1648, which former Royalist officers turned into an organised revolt, sparking off the Second English Civil War. The Royalists seized Rochester, Sittingbourne, Faversham and Sandwich, followed by Dartford and Deptford on 26 May. The Prince of Wales landed at Sandwich on 29 May to put himself at the head of the rebellion, much of the Parliamentary Fleet in The Downs going over to him. Many of the gentleman of Kent joined and trained bandsmen could not be relied upon: Sir Richard Hardres (of the St Augustine TB Horse) joined the Royalists and besieged Dover Castle with about 2000 men.

Sir Thomas Fairfax led the New Model Army from London into Kent and defeated the main Royalist concentration at the Battle of Maidstone on 1 June. Many of the defeated Royalists retreated across the Thames Estuary into Essex, where they were pursued by the main body of the New Model. Fairfax sent detachments to reduce Canterbury (where the Royalists surrendered without a fight), to recover Deal, Walmer and Sandown Castles, and to relieve Dover.

Once Parliament had re-established full control it passed new Militia Acts in 1648 and 1650 that replaced lords lieutenant with county commissioners appointed by Parliament or the Council of State. At the same time the term 'Trained Band' began to disappear in most counties. Under the Commonwealth and Protectorate the militia received pay when called out, and operated alongside the New Model Army to control the country.

Large numbers of Trained Band units were called out across England in 1650 during the Scottish invasion of the Third English Civil War, including those of Kent. Twistleton's Kent Dragoons were ordered to join a concentration at Oxford, before the Scots army was defeated at the Battle of Worcester.

== Kent Militia ==
After the 1660 Stuart Restoration, the 1661 Militia Act re-established the local trained bands, but placed them under the Lord Lieutenant of Kent, who was directly appointed by the king, with the men selected by ballot. This was regarded as preferable to a large Standing Army, a concept tainted by the New Model Army that had supported The Protectorate. From this point, almost the whole burden of home defence and internal security was entrusted to the militia.

The Kent Militia did duty to defend against threatened Dutch and French invasions, and helped to fight the Great Fire of London. In 1697 the Kent Militia (independent of the Cinque Ports) still consisted of six regiments in the five lathes and the City of Canterbury. However, the Militia passed into virtual abeyance during the long peace after the Treaty of Utrecht in 1712, until renewed threat of French invasion during the Seven Years' War led to a series of Militia Acts from 1757 that re-established the county militia regiments. Kent raised the West and East Kent Militia, which continued in service until the end of World War I.
