= George Vane (born 1618) =

English politician (1613–1662)

Sir George Vane
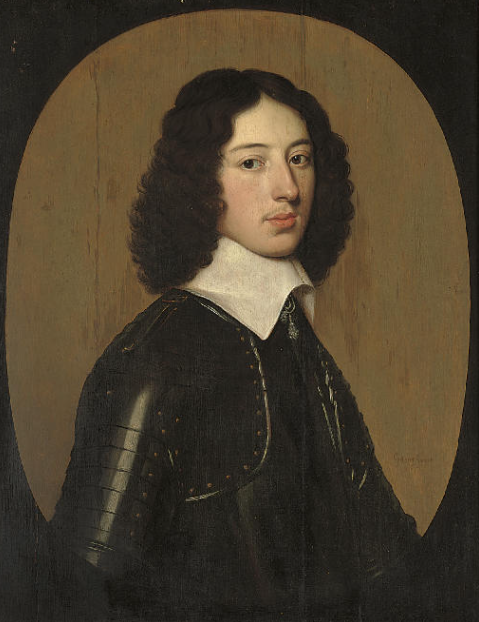
- Portrait by the circle of Gerrit van Honthorst

High Sheriff of Durham
- In office 1646–1646
- Preceded by: Henry Vane the Elder
- Succeeded by: Richard Belasyse

Personal details
- Born: baptised 10 May 1618 Shipbourne, Kent, England
- Died: 28 April 1679 (aged 60)
- Spouse: Elizabeth Maddison
- Children: Lionel Vane
- Parent(s): Henry Vane the Elder; Frances d'Arcy

Sir George Vane of Barnard Castle (baptised 10 May 1618 – c. 28 April 1679) was an English politician and the second son of Sir Henry Vane the Elder, an MP who served King Charles in many posts, including secretary of state.

== Early life ==
Vane was baptised on 10 May 1618 at Shipbourne, Kent. He was the second son of Rt. Hon. Sir Henry Vane the Elder and Frances d'Arcy, the daughter of Thomas Darcy of Tolleshunt D'Arcy, Essex. Among his siblings were Henry Vane the Younger, sixth colonial governor of Massachusetts, Charles Vane, agent of the Commonwealth at Lisbon, William Vane, a soldier in Dutch service, Sir Walter Vane, also a soldier in the Dutch service (killed serving under the Prince of Orange at the Battle of Seneffe), Margaret Vane, who married Sir Thomas Pelham, 2nd Baronet, Frances Vane, who married Sir Robert Honywood, Anne Vane, who married Sir Thomas Liddell of Ravensworth, Durham, and Elizabeth Vane, who married Sir Francis Vincent of Stoke d'Abernon, Surrey.

== Career ==
He was appointed knight on 22 November 1640. He was parliamentary High Sheriff of Durham in September 1645, and apparently treasurer of the committee for the county. Many of his letters to his father on the affairs of the county are printed in the calendar of domestic state papers.

He seized and defended Raby Castle, his father's property, for the King Charles I during the earlier part of Cromwell's rebellion.

== Personal life ==
Vane married Elizabeth Maddison, daughter and heiress of Sir Lionel Maddison of Rogerly, Durham, and lived at Long Newton, County Durham. Together, they were the parents of:

- Lionel Vane, who married Catherine Fletcher, daughter of Sir George Fletcher, 2nd Baronet, and Alice Hare (a daughter of the 1st Baron Coleraine), in 1680.

Sir George died c. 28 April 1679 and was buried on 1 May 1679.

=== Descendants ===
He was the ancestor of the Vanes of Hutton Hall, of Penrith, Cumbria, as well as Sir Henry Vane-Tempest, 2nd Baronet.
