= East Kent Militia =

Auxiliary unit of the British Army

East Kent Militia 3rd Battalion, Buffs (East Kent Regiment)
- Active: 25 February 1760–1 April 1953
- Country: Kingdom of Great Britain (1760–1800); United Kingdom (1801–1953)
- Branch: Militia/Special Reserve
- Type: Infantry
- Part of: Buffs (East Kent Regiment)
- Garrison/HQ: Canterbury
- Engagements: Second Boer War

Commanders
- Notable commanders: Col Sir Theodore Brinckman, 3rd Baronet, CB

The East Kent Militia, later the 3rd Battalion, Buffs (East Kent Regiment) was an auxiliary (Note: It is incorrect to describe the British Militia as 'irregular': throughout their history they were equipped and trained exactly like the line regiments of the regular army, and once embodied in time of war they were fulltime professional soldiers for the duration of their enlistment.) regiment raised in Kent in South East England. From its formal creation in 1760 the regiment served in home and colonial defence in all of Britain's major wars until 1918, seeing active service in the Second Boer War and supplying thousands of reinforcements to the Buffs during World War I.

== Background ==
The universal obligation to military service in the Shire levy was long established in England and its legal basis was updated by two acts of 1557 (4 & 5 Ph. & M. cc. 2 and 3), which placed selected men, the 'Trained Bands', under the command of Lords Lieutenant appointed by the monarch. This is seen as the starting date for the organised county militia in England. The Kent Trained Bands were on high alert during the Armada crisis in 1588 and saw some active service during the English Civil War. The Militia was re-established in 1662 after the Restoration of the Monarchy, and was popularly seen as the 'Constitutional Force' in contrast to the 'Standing Army' that was tainted by association with the New Model Army that had supported the military dictatorship of The Protectorate. The militia were kept up during the wars against Louis XIV, when Kent's contingent consisted of six regiments. However, the militia declined in the years after the Peace of Utrecht in 1713.

== East Kent Militia ==
Under threat of French invasion during the Seven Years' War a series of Militia Acts from 1757 re-established county militia regiments, the men being conscripted by means of parish ballots (paid substitutes were permitted) to serve for three years. There was a property qualification for officers, who were commissioned by the lord lieutenant. Kent was given a quota of 960 men to raise, and quickly formed the West Kent Militia, which received its weapons on 20 November 1758 and was embodied for service the following year. The East Kent Militia followed, its weapons being dispatched from the Tower of London on 25 February 1760, when it had reached 60 per cent of its establishment strength. Its headquarters was at Canterbury. However, unlike the West Kents, it was not embodied for fulltime service during the war.

=== War of American Independence ===
The Militia was called out after the outbreak of the War of American Independence when the country was threatened with invasion by the Americans' allies, France and Spain. This time the East Kent Militia was embodied on 31 March 1778. That summer the regiment was at Warley Camp in Essex, training alongside other Militia and Regular regiments. John Sawbridge of Olantigh, Kent, Member of Parliament (MP) and former Lord Mayor of London, was commissioned as Colonel of the regiment in 1779 and held the command until his death in 1795. In the summer of 1782 the regiment joined the Bedfordshire and West Suffolk regiments in a militia camp at Danbury, Essex, under Maj-Gen St John. The militia was disembodied at the conclusion of the war in 1782. From 1784 to 1792 the regiments were supposed to assemble for 28 days' annual training, even though to save money only two-thirds of the men were actually called out each year.

=== French Revolutionary and Napoleonic Wars ===
The militia was already being embodied when Revolutionary France declared war on Britain on 1 February 1793. The French Revolutionary Wars saw a new phase for the English militia: they were embodied for a whole generation, and became regiments of full-time professional soldiers (though restricted to service in the British Isles), which the regular army increasingly saw as a prime source of recruits. They served in coast defences, manning garrisons, guarding prisoners of war, and for internal security, while their traditional local defence duties were taken over by the Volunteers and mounted Yeomanry. On the death of Col Sawbridge, Sir Narborough D'Aeth, 3rd Baronet, of Knowlton, Kent, was appointed to succeed him on 3 March 1795. In the summer of 1798 the Irish Rebellion became serious, and the French were sending help to the rebels. The East Kent was one of the militia regiments that volunteered to serve in Ireland but its offer was not accepted.

The war ended with the Treaty of Amiens in March 1802 and all the militia were stood down. However, the Peace of Amiens was short-lived and the regiments, whose training commitment had been increased from 21 to 28 days a year, were embodied again in 1803. During the summer of 1805, when Napoleon was massing his 'Army of England' at Boulogne for a projected invasion, the East Kents were stationed at Dover until relieved by the Hereford Militia on 1 July. By 1 September that year the regiment (426 men in 10 Companies under Lt-Col William Pennell) had moved to Chelmsford Barracks, which it shared with the Royal Buckinghamshire Militia (King's Own) in Maj-Gen Duncan Campbell's brigade. Sir Narborough D'Aeth died in 1808 and Samuel Elias Sawbridge of Olantigh, former MP for Canterbury and son of the previous colonel, was appointed on 14 April 1808. He had been first commissioned into the regiment as an ensign in 1790, and retained the command until his own death in 1850.

The Interchange Act 1811 passed in July allowed English militia regiments to serve in Ireland and vice versa, and the East Kent Militia served there from 13 September 1811 to 8 October 1813. It was disembodied in June 1814, and was not called out during the short Waterloo Campaign.

== 1852 Reforms ==
After Waterloo there was another long peace. Although officers continued to be commissioned into the militia and ballots were still held, the regiments were rarely assembled for training and the permanent staffs of sergeants and drummers (who were occasionally used to maintain public order) were progressively reduced. The Militia of the United Kingdom was revived by the Militia Act 1852, enacted during a renewed period of international tension. As before, units were raised and administered on a county basis, and filled by voluntary enlistment (although conscription by means of the Militia Ballot might be used if the counties failed to meet their quotas). Training was for 56 days on enlistment, then for 21–28 days per year, during which the men received full army pay. Under the Act, Militia units could be embodied by Royal Proclamation for full-time home defence service in three circumstances:

1. 'Whenever a state of war exists between Her Majesty and any foreign power'.
2. 'In all cases of invasion or upon imminent danger thereof'.
3. 'In all cases of rebellion or insurrection'.

The position of colonel was abolished in militia regiments, the commanding officer in future holding the rank of lieutenant-colonel, although the regiment could appoint an honorary colonel.

=== Crimean War and after ===
War having broken out with Russia in 1854 and an expeditionary force sent to the Crimea, the militia began to be called out for home defence. The East Kent Militia was embodied in 1854 and was stationed at Chichester by 9 June, moving to Portsmouth by 8 September, and was then at Woolwich from November to Marc 1855. The regiment then volunteered for overseas garrison service and was sent to Malta, arriving by May and remaining for a year. The regiment was disembodied in 1856, and was awarded the Mediterranean Battle Honour.

The East Kents were among the small number of militia regiments embodied during the Indian Mutiny to relieve Regular troops. It was again stationed at Woolwich, by December 1857, then at Aldershot from July 1858 to July 1859. It moved to Portsmouth by 1 August, where it stayed until February 1860. Then by 5 March 1860 it had been sent to Weymouth, where it guarded convicts at Portland Prison working on the stone breakwaters of Portland Harbour., where there had been disturbances. It was relieved by the King's Own (1st Staffordshire) Militia in May before returning to Portsmouth where it was disembodied in June.

Thereafter the militia regiments were called out for their annual training.

== Cardwell reforms ==
Under the 'Localisation of the Forces' scheme introduced by the Cardwell Reforms of 1872, militia regiments were brigaded with their local regular and Volunteer battalions – for the East Kent Militia this was with the two battalions of the Buffs (East Kent Regiment) in Sub-District No 45 (County of Kent) at Canterbury. The militia now came under the War Office rather than their county lords lieutenant. Around a third of the recruits and many young officers went on to join the regular army.

Although often referred to as brigades, the sub-districts were purely administrative organisations, but in a continuation of the Cardwell Reforms a mobilisation scheme began to appear in the Army List from December 1875. This assigned regular and militia units to places in an order of battle of corps, divisions and brigades for the 'Active Army', even though these formations were entirely theoretical, with no staff or services assigned. The East Kent Militia's assigned war station was in the Dover defences as part of the Garrison Army.

The Cardwell organisation envisaged two militia battalions to each sub-district, and the East Kent Militia formed a 2nd Battalion on 29 July 1876, though it was never fully formed.

=== 3rd Battalion, Buffs (East Kent Regiment) ===
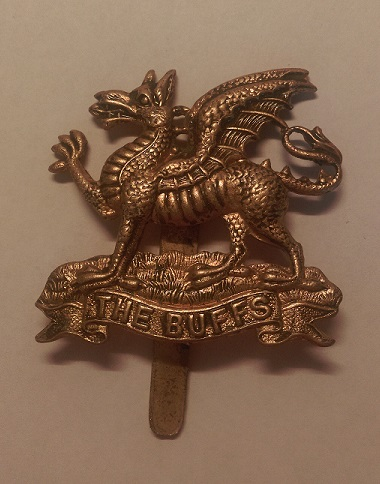
Cap badge of the Buffs (East Kent Regiment).

The Childers Reforms took Cardwell's reforms further, with the militia formally joining their linked regiments as their 3rd and 4th Battalions on 1 July 1881. Although the 2nd Bn East Kent Militia was designated to be the 4th Bn Buffs, it was only at cadre strength, and was absorbed by the 1st Bn (now 3rd Buffs) on 1 April 1888

The 3rd Bn Buffs was embodied from 9 March to 30 September 1885 during the Panjdeh Crisis.

=== Second Boer War ===
After the disasters of Black Week at the start of the Second Boer War in December 1899, most of the regular army was sent to South Africa, and many militia units were embodied to replace them for home defence and to garrison certain overseas stations. Some were then permitted to volunteer for active service in South Africa. The 3rd Buffs was embodied on 18 January 1900. After volunteering, 16 officers and 551 other ranks under the command of Lt-Col Theodore Brinckman sailed from Southampton to Cape Town on 10 March aboard the SS Moor. Arriving at Cape Town on 28 March the battalion was sent to Bethany in the Orange Free State (OFS), where it joined 22nd Brigade of 3rd Division on 2 April. Next day the brigade marched out to re-occupy Reddersburg, which it had done by 11 April. The battalion then worked with 1st (Guards) Brigade of 11th Division and with 8th Division (commanded by the battalion's Honorary Colonel, Lt-Gen Sir Leslie Rundle) in the operations from 16 April to seize Dewetsdorp, 15 miles (24 km) south of Bloemfontein. The battalion reached Dewetsdorp on 29 April.

On 9 June the battalion was rushed to reinforce the garrison at Kroonstad, and on 23 June five of its companies were included in a 2000-strong column sent 55 miles (89 km) to relieve Maj-Gen Arthur Paget, besieged at Lindley. The column met considerable opposition, with two days' hard fighting at Doornkloof and Paardeplats, but succeeded in its object and entered the town on 27 June. Afterwards, Lt-Gen Thomas Kelly-Kenny, commanding the Lines of Communication, wrote to Lord Roberts, commanding in South Africa, that 'he was pleased to observe that a Militia Battn (the 3rd Buffs) distinguished itself on this occasion'. The battalion then returned to Kroonstad, escorting the convoy of wounded and sick.

On 25 September the 3rd Buffs left as escort to a construction train repairing the branch railway between Wolverhoek and Heilbron and on 3 October took part in engagements between the two towns as De Wet crossed the railway. On 10 October the battalion joined a column under Lt-Gen Sir Archibald Hunter on a sweep through north-west OFS, returning on 26 October. Two companies then accompanied Hunter to Ventersdorp, which he entered on 30 October. He wrote to Roberts that 'The 3rd Bn of The Buffs was hotly engaged and behaved with conspicuous steadiness'. Until 15 December the battalion was employed in guarding the railway, but Hunter requested it for Maj-Gen Hector MacDonald's march through the Springfontein area into Cape Colony to deal with a Boer invasion. It took part in engagements at Bethulie Bridge, Olive Siding and Colesberg, returning to Kroonstad on 30 December. The weather had been extremely bad and the battalion was reduced by sickness to a strength of just three companies, which were used to garrison Kroonstad and Lindley.

For the next year the battalion was used for convoy escorts and to man the lines of blockhouses that were constructed to restrict the Boers' freedom of movement. On 1 August 1901 six men of the 3rd Buffs under Sergeant Pincott were manning Blockhouse 493/1 when they were attacked by 250–300 Boers. Sergeant Pincott was soon killed, but the garrison held out until only one was left unwounded and the Boers forced their way in. The Boers then withdrew having suffered heavy casualties. Skirmishes along the blockhouse lines were constant throughout the year. The 3rd Buffs were relieved and embarked on 21 January 1902, but only as far as Saint Helena. Here they spent a further six months guarding Boer prisoners of war. The battalion was finally disembodied on 17 July 1902.

== Special Reserve ==
After the Boer War, the future of the Militia was called into question. There were moves to reform the Auxiliary Forces (Militia, Yeomanry and Volunteers) to take their place in the six Army Corps proposed by the Secretary of State for War, St John Brodrick. However, little of Brodrick's scheme was carried out. Under the more sweeping Haldane Reforms of 1908, the Militia was replaced by the Special Reserve (SR), a semi-professional force whose role was to provide reinforcement drafts for regular units serving overseas in wartime, rather like the earlier Militia Reserve. The battalion became the 3rd (Reserve) Battalion, Buffs (East Kent Regiment), on 28 June 1908.

== World War I ==
=== 3rd (Reserve) Battalion ===
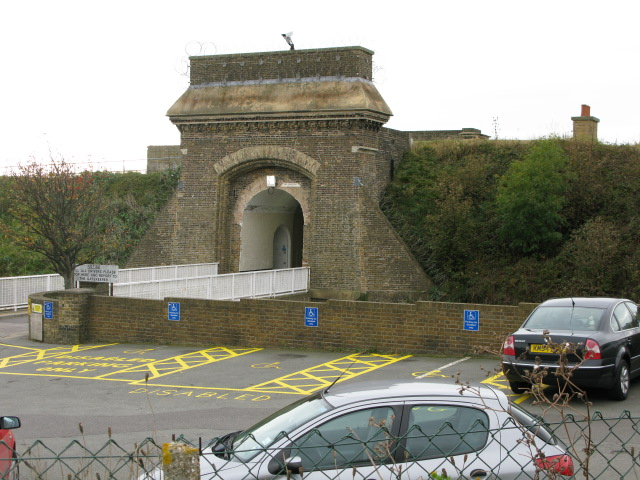
The Citadel at Dover, base of the 3rd (Reserve) Bn Buffs throughout World War I.

The 3rd (SR) Battalion was embodied under the command of Lt-Col Harry Hirst (CO since 30 June 1912) on the outbreak of war on 4 August 1914 and four days later moved to its war station at Dover, where it remained in garrison for the whole war. From its base at the Citadel, its role was to equip the Reservists and Special Reservists of the Buffs and send them as reinforcement drafts to the Regular battalions serving overseas (the 1st on the Western Front, the 2nd, after its return from India, also served briefly on the Western Front and then from November 1915 spent the rest of the war at Salonika). Once the pool of reservists had dried up, the 3rd Bn trained thousands of raw recruits for the active service battalions.

One draft for the 10th (Royal East Kent and West Kent Yeomanry) Bn, then serving in Palestine, was travelling aboard HM Transport Aragon when it was torpedoed and sunk off Alexandria on 30 December 1917. Although hundreds of men died in the sinking, the draft from the 3rd Buffs was praised for its discipline in parading on deck and then launching life rafts, with the loss of only one man missing from the draft.

3rd (Reserve) Battalion was disembodied on 12 September 1919, when the remaining personnel were drafted to the 1st Bn.

=== 9th (Reserve) Battalion ===
After Lord Kitchener issued his call for volunteers in August 1914, the battalions of the 1st, 2nd and 3rd New Armies ('K1', 'K2' and 'K3' of 'Kitchener's Army') were quickly formed at the regimental depots. The SR battalions also swelled with new recruits and were soon well above their establishment strength. On 8 October 1914 each SR battalion was ordered to use the surplus to form a service battalion of the 4th New Army ('K4'). Accordingly, the 3rd Reserve Bn formed the 9th Reserve Bn, Buffs at Dover, where it was accommodated in the South Front Barracks. Commanded by Lt-Col R.A. Reith, a former CO of the 3rd (R) Bn, it was to be part of 95th Brigade in 32nd Division and began training for active service. On 10 April 1915 the War Office decided to convert the K4 units into 2nd Reserve battalions to train reinforcement drafts for the K1–K3 battalions, in the same way that the SR did for the regular battalions; 95th Brigade became 7th Reserve Brigade. In May 1915 the battalion moved to Purfleet and in July it sent out its first reinforcement draft of 300 men, who exercised the Buffs' ancient privilege of marching through the City of London with fixed bayonets. In September the battalion moved to Shoreham-by-Sea, before returning to Dover in April 1916. Most drafts went to the Regular battalions of the Buffs, but one very large one of 40 officers and 500 men was sent to the 8th (Service) Bn after its terrible casualties at the Battle of Loos. On 1 September 1916 the K4 battalions became part of the Training Reserve (TR), and 9th Buffs became 29th Training Reserve Battalion in 7th Reserve Bde. In January 1917 it was given responsibility for training 'A4 Boys' (18-year-olds who were fit for service but too young to be sent overseas), which took the battalion to a strength of nearly 3000 with four additional companies. On 4 July 1917 the 29th was redesignated 255th (Infantry) Battalion of the TR. On 14 October 1917 it was transferred to the Queen's (Royal West Surrey Regiment) as 52nd (Graduated) Battalion at Colchester, when most of the original officers and non-commissioned officers returned to the 3rd (R) Bn Buffs. The 52nd (G) Bn Queen's served in 214th Brigade of 71st Division, later moving to 213th Bde. On 18 February 1918 it moved to 192nd Brigade in 64th Division at Norwich, and at the end of the war was stationed at Cromer. Postwar it was converted into a service battalion on 8 February 1919, and it was finally absorbed into the 11th (Lambeth) Bn of the Queen's on 17 April 1919.

=== Postwar ===
The SR resumed its old title of Militia in 1921 but like most militia units the 3rd Buffs remained in abeyance after World War I. By the outbreak of World War II in 1939, no officers remained listed for the battalion. The Militia was formally disbanded in April 1953.

== Heritage and ceremonial ==
=== Uniforms and insignia ===
As early as 1778 the Kent Militia regiments are reported to have worn red coats with grey facings, but a 1780 source suggests this was light blue. In the 19th Century both Kent Militia regiments wore facings described as 'Kentish Grey'. The badge for both regiments was the White Horse of Kent with the motto Invicta. The Shako plate of 1840 carried the White Horse in silver, with a scroll above inscribed 'East Kent' and a scroll beneath inscribed Invicta, the whole on a gilt crowned eight-pointed star.

After 1881 the battalion adopted the insignia of the Buffs, including its traditional buff coloured facings and Dragon badge.

=== Precedence ===
During the War of American Independence the counties were given an order of precedence determined by ballot each year. For the Kent Militia the positions were:

- 12th on 1 June 1778
- 4th on12 May 1779
- 36th on 6 May 1780
- 27th on 28 April 1781
- 23rd on 7 May 1782

The militia order of precedence balloted for in 1793 (Kent was 1st) remained in force throughout the French Revolutionary War: this covered all the regiments in the county. Another ballot for precedence took place at the start of the Napoleonic War, when Kent was 57th.This order continued until 1833. In that year the King drew the lots for individual regiments and the resulting list remained in force with minor amendments until the end of the militia. The regiments raised before the peace of 1763 took the first 47 places (West Kent was 37th); presumably because the East Kents were not embodied until 1778, it was placed in the second group as 49th. Formally, the regiment became the '49th, or East Kent Militia', but most regiments paid little notice to the additional number.

=== Colonels ===
The following served as Colonel or (after 1852) Honorary Colonel of the regiment:

Colonel

- John Sawbridge, appointed 1779, died 21 February 1795
- Sir Narborough D'Aeth, 3rd Baronet, appointed 3 March 1795, died 6 April 1808
- Samuel Elias Sawbridge, appointed 14 April 1808, died 27 May 1850
- Vacant
- George Brockman, former Captain, 85th Foot, appointed 15 September 1852

Honorary Colonel

- George, 3rd Baron Harris, GCSI, appointed 13 May 1864
- Lt-Gen George Bingham, CB, former CO, appointed 26 April 1873
- Maj-Gen Sir Leslie Rundle, KCB, CMG, DSO, appointed 21 June 1899
- Col Sir Theodore Brinckman, 3rd Baronet, CB, former CO, appointed 15 July 1907

=== Battle honours ===
The regiment was awarded the following Battle Honours:

- Mediterranean
- South Africa 1900–02

Under Army Order 251 of 1910, the Special Reserve were to bear the same battle honours as their parent regiments, so the Mediterranean honour, which was peculiar to militia units, was extinguished.

== See also ==
- Militia (Great Britain)
- Militia (United Kingdom)
- Special Reserve
- Kent Trained Bands
- Kent Militia
- West Kent Light Infantry
- Buffs (Royal East Kent Regiment)
