= Andrew Broughton =

Clerk at trial of Charles I of England

Andrew Broughton (1602/03–1687) was Clerk of the Court at the High Court of Justice for the trial of King Charles I of England.

== Biography ==
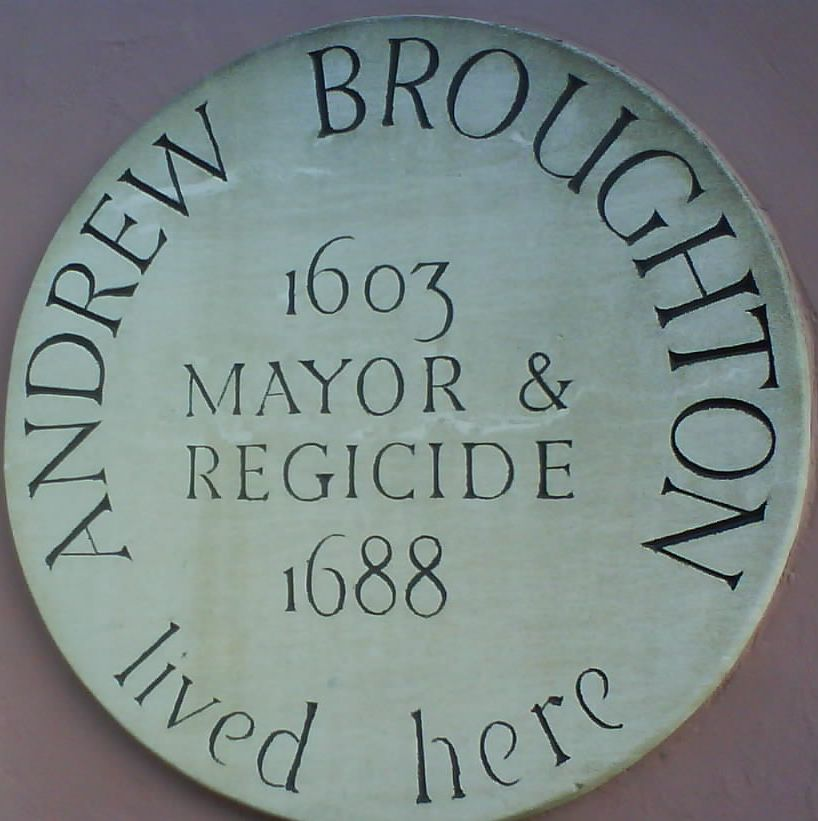
Plaque commemorating Broughton on the house in which he lived in Earl Street, Maidstone, Kent

There are not many records of his early life. He was probably born in Seaton, Rutland as the younger son of Richard Broughton (d. 1635). By 1627 Broughton was living in Maidstone, Kent and in 1639 he was appointed clerk of the peace for the county of Kent by the Earl of Pembroke who was at that time Lord Chamberlain. He lost this position under the machinations surrounding the start of the English Civil War, specifically his involvement in the impeachment of Earl of Strafford and the imprisonment of Geoffrey Palmer for protesting against the Grand Remonstrance.

"Broughton was a member of the Kent county committee from 1643. He acted as attorney on behalf of the corporation of Maidstone during the First English Civil War. In November 1648 he was elected Mayor of the town. Two months later he was appointed Clerk of the Court at the High Court of Justice for the trial of King Charles I of England. As Clerk of the Court, it was Broughton who read out the charge against the king and required him to plead, and at the end of the trial declared the court's sentence of death.

During the English Interregnum he served as a member of the Barebones Parliament, on the Council of State between 14 July 1653 and November 1653, and in the Third Protectorate Parliament in which "Towards Richard himself he was positively insulting" (Woolrych, 222).

At the Restoration Broughton, was exempted from the general pardon under the Indemnity and Oblivion Act, and was likely to lose his life—The other clerk at the trial, John Phelps was also exempted but only for "penalties not extending to Life"—so Broughton and Phelps fled, reports in 1662 placed them in Hamburg, but later that year Broughton arrived in Lausanne in Switzerland where several other regicides were residing. In 1664 he travelled to Bern with Edmund Ludlow and Nicholas Love, to thank the senate of Bern for their offer of sanctuary. Broughton remained in exile for 25 years dying peacefully in Vevey, where he was buried in the church of St Martin.
