= Thomas Blount (inventor) =

English soldier, Member of Parliament and inventor

Thomas Blount or Blunt (born ca. 1604) was an English soldier, Member of Parliament and inventor.

== Life ==
Blount was born in Wricklesmarsh, in Charlton, Kent, the second son of Edward Blount of the Middle Temple and his second wife, Fortune, daughter of Sir William Garway. Blount was educated at Brasenose College, Oxford where he matriculated in 1623. He was admitted to Grays Inn in 1624.

He was present at the meetings of Royalist country gentlemen at Maidstone, which resulted in the getting up the Kentish petition of March 1642, and turned informer, giving an account of the proceedings in evidence at the bar of the House of Commons. He was a colonel in the Parliamentary Army during the Civil War. On the Restoration of the monarchy he was imprisoned but subsequently released. He represented Kent as an MP in the Barebones Parliament of 1653.

He knew many of the Fellows of the Royal Society. He was himself admitted as a Fellow in February 1665 but resigned in 1668.
