= William Kenrick (Member of Barebone's Parliament) =

English politician (c.1653–??)

William Kenrick (fl. 1653), was an English Member of Parliament (MP).

He was a Member of the Parliament of England for Kent in 1653.
