= John Dixwell =

English regicide

John Dixwell, alias James Davids
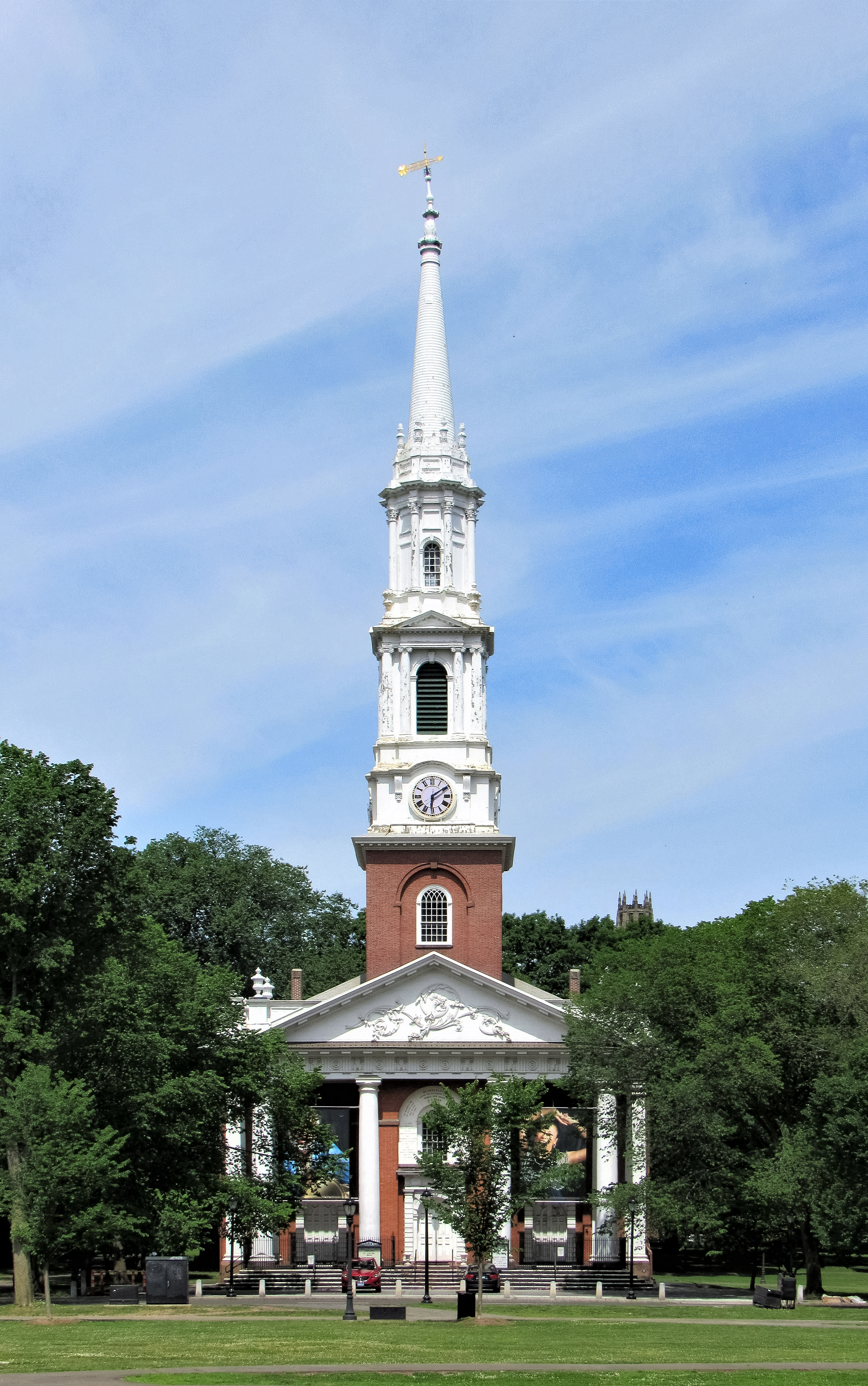
- Center Church on the Green, New Haven, Connecticut; its cemetery includes Dixwell's monument

Member of Parliament for Dover
- In office Long Parliament August 1646 to April 1653 (dissolved); reseated May 1659, dissolved March 1660 – Third Protectorate Parliament January to April 1659

Member of Parliament for Kent
- In office 1654–1658

Governor of Dover Castle
- In office January 1652 – May 1660

English Council of State
- In office November 1651 to October 1652 – May to December 1659

Personal details
- Born: c. 1607 Chilvers Coton, Warwickshire
- Died: 18 March 1689 New Haven, Connecticut
- Resting place: Center Church on the Green
- Spouse(s): (1) Joanna Ling (November 1673) (2) Bathsheba Howe (1677–his death)
- Children: (2) Mary; John; Elizabeth
- Education: Lincoln's Inn

Military service
- Allegiance: Parliamentarian
- Rank: Colonel
- Unit: Kent Trained Bands
- Battles/wars: Wars of the Three Kingdoms

John Dixwell, alias James Davids (c. 1607 – 18 March 1689), was an English lawyer, republican politician and regicide. Born in Warwickshire, during the Wars of the Three Kingdoms he held various administrative positions in Kent on behalf of Parliament, and approved the Execution of Charles I in January 1649. Under the Commonwealth, he served as Governor of Dover Castle, and was a member of the English Council of State.

Aware that he faced likely prosecution as a regicide, Dixwell fled to Germany shortly before the May 1660 Stuart Restoration, and was condemned to death by Parliament. He later made his way to New Haven, Connecticut, where he lived quietly under the name of James Davids, untroubled by the authorities, who thought him dead. He died in 1689.

== Personal details ==
John Dixwell was born c. 1607, younger son of Edward Dixwell (1575–1617), and his wife Mary Hawksworth (1580–1627). He had an elder brother Mark (?–1644), who was killed serving under the Parliamentarian general William Waller.

After moving to New England, in November 1673 he married Joanna Ling, who died shortly afterwards. Bathsheba Howe (1648–1729) became his second wife in 1677, and they had three children; Mary (1679–1727), John (1681–1725), and Elizabeth (died young).

== First and Second English Civil Wars ==
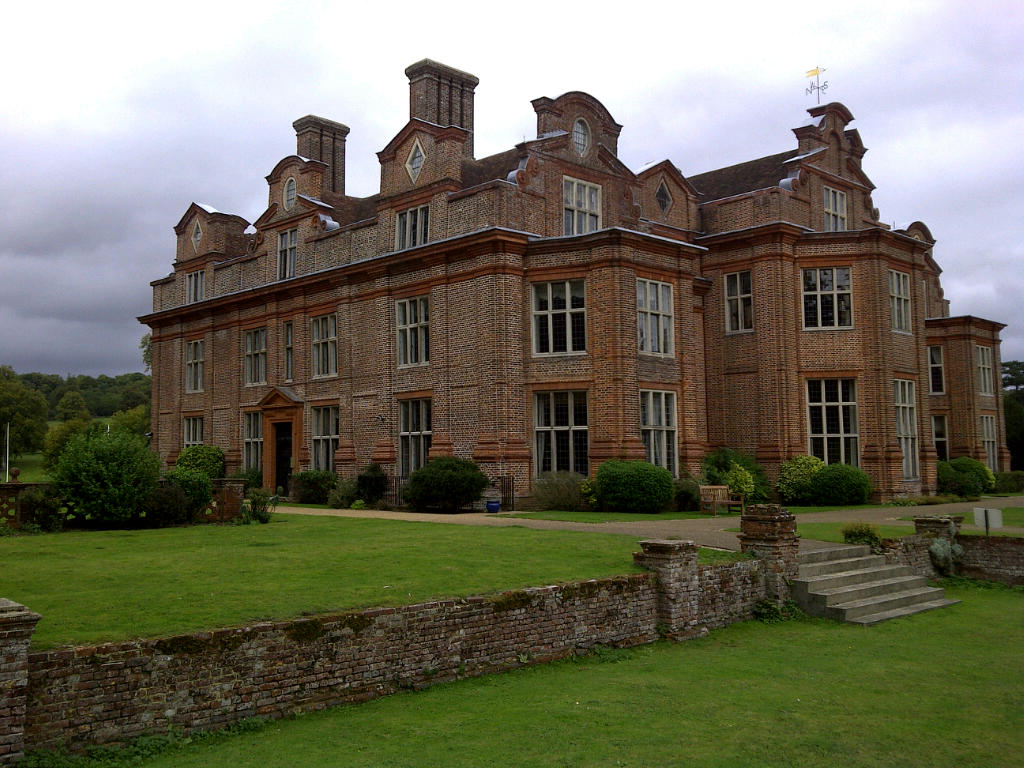
Broome Park, rebuilt at great expense between 1635 and 1638 by Dixwell's guardian, Sir Basil Dixwell

After their father died in 1617, Dixwell and his brother seem to have been raised by their childless and wealthy relative, Sir Basil Dixwell (1585–1642), a former High Sheriff of Kent who lived near Folkestone. In the late 1630s, he moved to Broome Park, which was inherited by Mark Dixwell when Sir Basil died in 1642. John Dixwell began legal training at Lincoln's Inn in 1631, and qualified as a lawyer in 1638.

When the First English Civil War began in August 1642, Kent was quickly secured for Parliament, although there were significant pockets of Royalist support. In July 1643, the Royalists assembled some 4,000 men at Sevenoaks, which had to be suppressed by Parliamentarian troops led by Richard Browne. Its proximity to London and key ports like Dover, Deal and Sandwich meant control of the county was an important strategic objective for both sides.

Kent; key locations in article

John Dixwell played a prominent role in the local Parliamentary administration, serving on the County Committee which collected taxes and controlled the courts. His older brother Mark was a colonel in the Kent Trained Bands until his death in early 1644, when John was appointed guardian of his children and took up residence in Broome Park. He succeeded Mark as colonel of the local militia, and in August 1646 was elected MP for Dover in the Long Parliament, replacing Sir Edward Boys.

The First Civil War ended when Charles I surrendered in June 1646, but victory was succeeded by a series of disputes over the post-war political settlement between the New Model Army and the majority of MPs. In this contest, Dixwell appears to have sympathised with the army and religious Independents in Parliament. (Note: "Puritan" was a general term used for those who wanted to "purify" the Church of England of so-called "Catholic" practices. They covered many different shades of religious and political beliefs, and some supported the Royalists. By 1646, Puritans who backed Parliament had divided into two broad factions; Presbyterians, who wanted a national church and highly-regulated liturgy similar to the Church of Scotland, and Independents like Oliver Cromwell who rejected any state religion, and advocated tolerance of belief for all non-Catholics. At a time when "true religion" and "good government" were often assumed to be the same thing, these differences mattered) In December 1647, protests in Canterbury against alterations to the Book of Common Prayer escalated into a pro-Royalist revolt, which was eventually put down by the County Committee.

When the Second English Civil War began in early 1648, Kentish Royalists occupied towns including Maidstone and Dover. By August, the rising had been suppressed, but many Independents like Dixwell now believed only the removal of Charles I would end the fighting. In December 1648, Pride's Purge excluded all MPs who opposed putting him on trial, and Dixwell was one of those who retained their seats in what became known as the "Rump Parliament". He sat on the court set up for the trial, and approved the Execution of Charles I in January 1649.

== The Interregnum ==
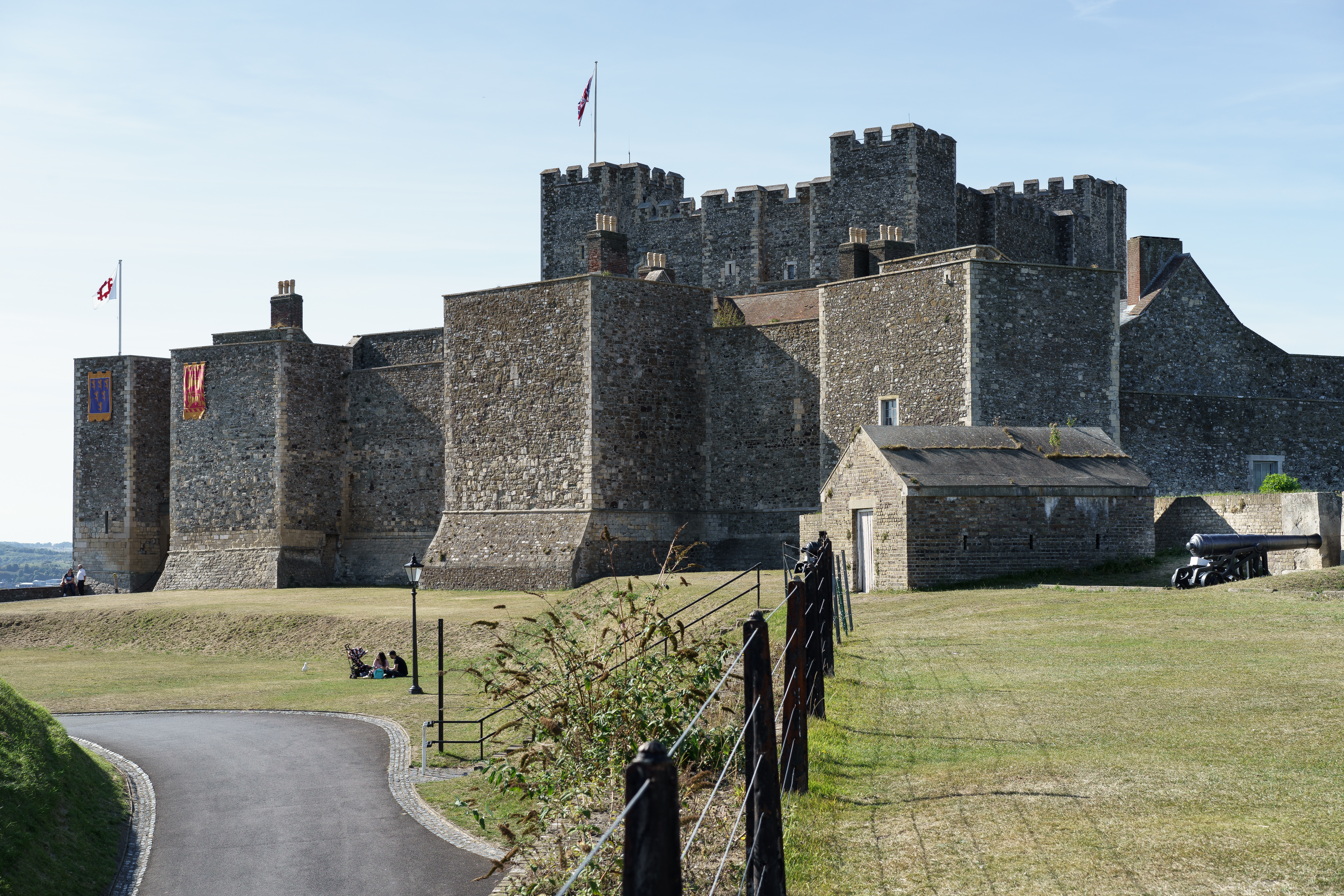
Dover Castle; Dixwell was Governor from 1652 to 1660

Dixwell was made a member of the English Council of State in November 1651, then confirmed as Governor of Dover Castle in January 1652. However, his closest political allies were republicans like Edmund Ludlow and Henry Vane, who opposed Cromwell's dissolution of the Rump Parliament in April 1653, and establishment of The Protectorate. Unlike Ludlow, Dixwell did not openly oppose the regime, and was elected MP for Kent in 1654 and 1656, then for Dover once again in 1659.

However, in the political crisis that followed the death of Oliver Cromwell in September 1658, and the resignation of his successor Richard Cromwell in April 1659, Dixwell sided with those who wanted to re-assert civilian control over the army, and restore the Commonwealth. When the Rump Parliament was re-installed in May 1659, he resumed his seat as MP for Dover, was confirmed as Governor of Dover Castle, and appointed to the Council of State. Along with Vane and Oliver St John, he was one of three councillors who refused to swear an oath of allegiance to the Protectorate.

By spring 1660, it was clear efforts to maintain the Commonwealth had failed, and a Stuart Restoration was imminent. In May, Charles II issued the Declaration of Breda, which offered a general pardon for all "crimes" committed since 1640, with the notable exception of the regicides. In June, Dixwell was one of ten regicides whose lives were guaranteed in return for their surrender, but decided not to rely upon this commitment. To protect his estates from confiscation, he sold part of Broome Park to his Royalist neighbour Sir Thomas Peyton, while his nephew Basill Dixwell married one of Peyton's daughters. (Note: Dixwell's astuteness meant the property remained in his family until 1911) After requesting a delay due to illness, he escaped into exile, and on 11 June 1660, Parliament passed an Act of Attainder, which condemned twenty-three regicides to death, including Dixwell.

== Exile, later life, and death ==
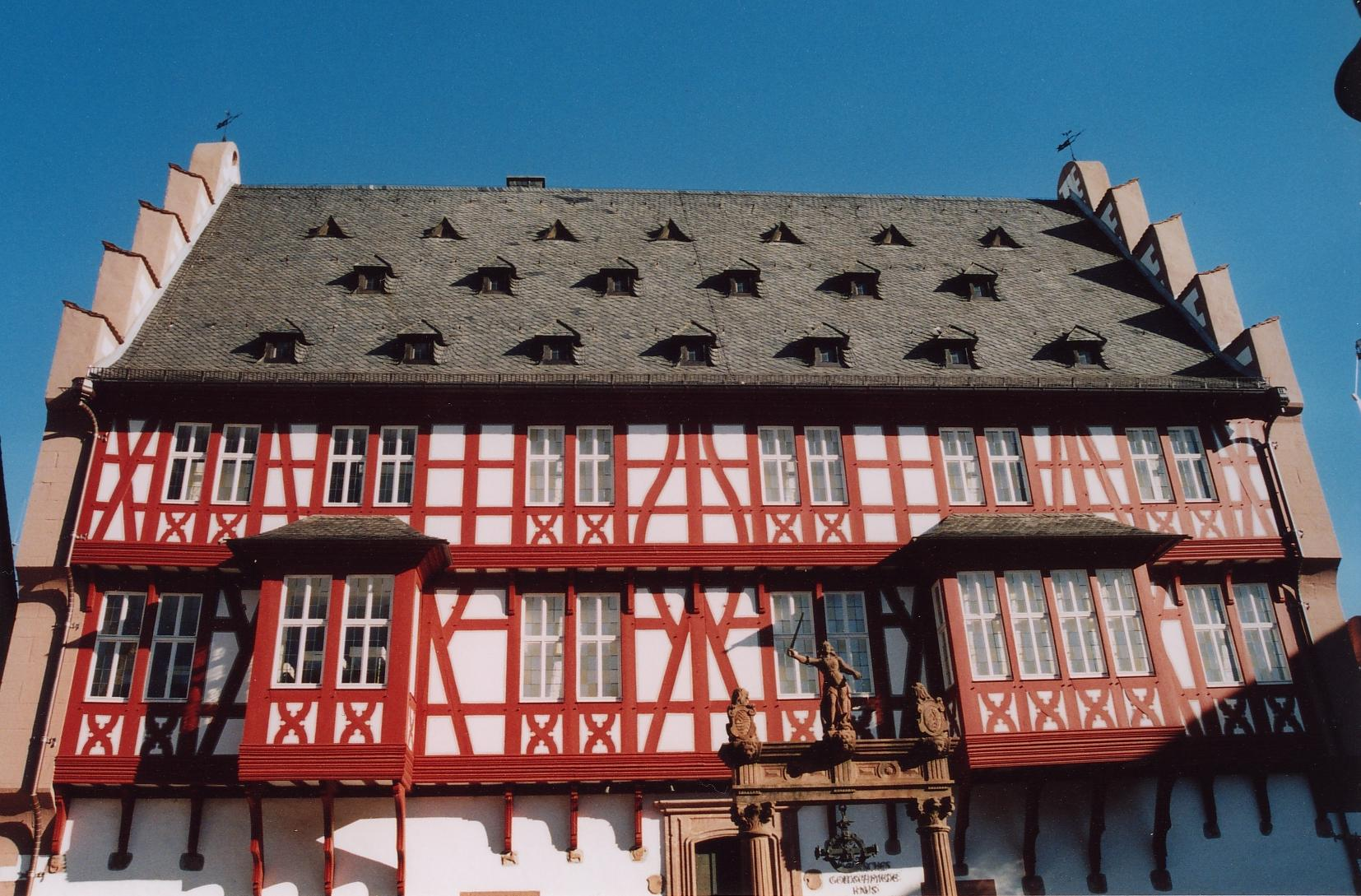
City hall, Hanau; a well-known refuge for religious and political dissidents, Dixwell lived in the town during the first years of his exile

Coat of Arms of John Dixwell

Along with other exiles, Dixwell initially settled in the German town of Hanau, a well-known refuge for political and religious dissidents. With Royalist agents actively seeking to kidnap or assassinate those regicides still at large, several decided Hanau was too exposed. At some point, Dixwell moved to Switzerland, before sailing for New England in early 1665. He spent the next two years in Hadley, Massachusetts, where he briefly shared lodgings with two other regicides, William Goffe and Edward Whalley.

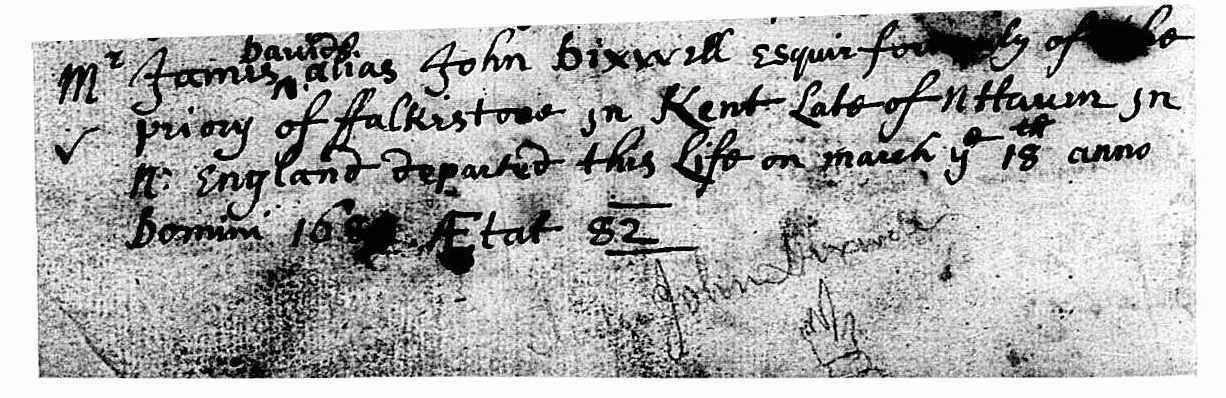
Original death record of John Dixwell, found in the vital records of New Haven, Connecticut

Unlike his two companions, who were known to be in New England, no warrants were issued for Dixwell, since the authorities had been unable to trace him and assumed he had died. He settled in New Haven, Connecticut in 1670, using the name "James Davids" and pretending to be a retired merchant. He remained committed to his republican views, writing ‘the Lord will appear for his people...and there will be those in power again who will relieve the injured and oppressed’. Although some of his neighbours suspected Dixwell was a fugitive, he lived quietly with his wife and children, and only revealed his true name just before he died on 18 March 1689.

== Legacy ==
Dixwell was laid to rest in the Old Burying Ground behind the Center Church on New Haven Green. The original monument is still visible, with a larger one added later. Various towns in New England have streets commemorating Dixwell, Whalley and Goffe, including Hadley and New Haven.

== Sources ==
- Braddick, Michael (2008). God's Fury, England's Fire; A New History of the English Civil Wars (2009 ed.). Penguin Books. ISBN 978-0141008974.
- Gentles, Ian (2002). Kenyon, John; Ohlmeyer, Jane (eds.). The Civil Wars in England in The Civil Wars; a Military History of England, Scotland and Ireland 1638-1660. OUP. ISBN 978-0192802781.
- Handley, Stuart (2002). DIXWELL, Sir Basill, 2nd Bt. (1665-1750), of Broome, Barham, Kent in The History of Parliament: the House of Commons 1690–1715. Boydell and Brewer. ISBN 978-1107002258.
- Heinz, Bernard (1976). Center Church On-the-Green. First Church of Christ.
- Hutton, Ronald (2021). The Making of Oliver Cromwell. Yale University Press. ISBN 978-0300257458.
- Jordan, Don; Walsh, Michael (2012). The King's Revenge; Charles II and the greatest manhunt in British history. Little, Brown. ISBN 978-1408703274.
- Lefevre, Peter; Thrush, Andrew (2010). "DIXWELL, Basil (1585-1642), of Terlingham, Folkestone, Kent; formerly of Canterbury, Kent; later of Broome Park, Barham, Kent". The History of Parliament: the House of Commons 1604–1629. CUP. ISBN 978-1107002258.
- Lindley, Keith (2004). "Browne, Sir Richard, first baronet (c. 1602–1669)". Oxford Dictionary of National Biography (online ed.). Oxford University Press. doi:10.1093/ref:odnb/3692. (Subscription, Wikipedia Library access or UK public library membership required.)
- Major, Dr Philip (2013). ""The good old cause for which I suffer": The Life of a Regicide in Exile". Literatures of Exile in the English Revolution and its Aftermath, 1640-1690. Ashgate Publishing. pp. 167–180. ISBN 978-1-4094-7614-6.
- Mayers, Ruth (2004). 1659: The Crisis of the Commonwealth. Royal Historical Society. ISBN 978-0861932689.
- Peacey, J.T. (2004). "Dixwell, John [James Davids] (c.1607–1689)". Oxford Dictionary of National Biography (online ed.). Oxford University Press. doi:10.1093/ref:odnb/7710. (Subscription, Wikipedia Library access or UK public library membership required.)
- Royle, Trevor (2004). Civil War: the Wars of the Three Kingdoms 1638-1660 (2006 ed.). Abacus. ISBN 978-0349115641.
- Spencer, Charles (2014). "The Regicides in America". History Today. 64 (10).
- Spencer, Charles (2015). Killers of the King: The Men Who Dared to Execute Charles I. Bloomsbury Paperbacks. ISBN 978-1408851777.
- Stiles, Ezra (1794). History of Three of the Judges of Charles I, Whalley, Goffe, Dixwell. Elisha Babcock, Hartford.
- Wedgwood, CV (1958). The King's War, 1641-1647 (2001 ed.). Penguin Classics. ISBN 978-0141390727.
