= Hendley family =

The Hendley family were English landowners in the county of Kent from before 1344 until the last male member of the main branch died childless and insane in 1798. They originally held the manor of Coursehorn in the parish of Cranbrook and later acquired the estate of Gore Court in the parish of Otham. Members of the family, which included knights and a baronet, served as a Member of Parliament and as High Sheriff of Kent.

== Principal members ==
- John I (died 1472), with his wife Mercy had an heir Thomas I.
- Thomas I (died 1495) married Joan, daughter of John Theobald, of Seal, and left as heir Gervase.
- Gervase (died 1534) married Elizabeth, daughter of Walter Roberts, of Glassenbury in Cranbrook, and left two sons: Sir Walter I, and Thomas II.
- Sir Walter I (died 1550), with his first wife Ellen, daughter of Thomas Ashburnham, of Broomham in Chiddingly, had three daughters: (1) Elizabeth, who married first Walter Waller, of Groombridge, and secondly George Fane, of Badsell in Tudely; (2) Ellen, who married first Sir Thomas Culpeper, of Bedgebury, elder brother of his namesake Thomas Culpeper who was executed in 1541 for adultery with Queen Catherine Howard, secondly Sir George Somerset, of Badmondfield, son of the first Earl of Worcester, and thirdly Thomas Fane, of Burston in Hunton, Lieutenant of Dover Castle; (3) Anne, who married Richard Covert of Slaugham.
- Thomas II (1503-1590), with his first wife Elizabeth, daughter of Robert Lamb, of Leeds, left as heir Walter II.
- Walter II (1532-1577), with his first wife Frances, daughter of Sir James Hales, left as heir Thomas III.
- Thomas III (1555-1590), with his first wife Anne, daughter of Henry Bowyer, of Cuckfield, and his wife Elizabeth Vaux, left as heir Sir Thomas IV.
- Sir Thomas IV (1580-1656), sheriff of Kent in 1637, married Elizabeth, daughter of John Wilford, of Enfield, and left two sons: Sir Walter III, and John II. A daughter, Ann, married Thomas Taylor, of Godmersham, and was the mother of Sir Thomas Taylor, 1st Baronet.
- Sir Walter III, 1st Baronet, (1612-1675) married Frances, daughter of Sir Thomas Springett, of Broyle in Ringmer, and left a daughter Mary, whose first husband was Sir William More, 2nd Baronet, of Loseley.
- John II (1617-1676) married Priscilla, daughter of Thomas Fludd, of Gore Court in Otham, and great-granddaughter of both Sir Thomas Fludd and Levin Bufkin. His heir was Bowyer.
- Bowyer (1655-1742), sheriff of Kent in 1702, married Mary, daughter of Thomas Sharpe, of Benenden, and left as heir William I. A daughter, Ann, married Samuel Horne, rector of Otham, and was the mother of George Horne, bishop of Norwich.
- William I (1686-1762) married Dorothea, daughter of William Singleton, and left as heir William II. One daughter, Dorothea, married Sir Beversham Filmer, 5th Baronet, and another, Priscilla, married Richard Hammett, rector of Clovelly.
- William II (1743-1798) married Dorothea, a German woman of unknown origin with an illegitimate child who called herself Countess Berghausen, and was declared insane in 1781 without having any children. His wife was then seduced by a fake Irish major, Robert Molloy, who with his lover, Esther Goldsborough, robbed her of all her belongings. However, as in law the things belonged to her husband's trustees, the pair were found not guilty. She died in 1793, and on his death his surviving sisters declined to act over settling his estate and goods, which went to his nephew William Horne.

== Arms ==
According to Philipot in 1619, the arms were:

Quarterly: 1 and 4, Paly bendy azure and gules, eight martlets in orle, three, two, and three, or (HENDLEY); 2 and 3, Argent, a saltire engrailed, ermines between four torteaux, on a chief azure a hind lodged or (HENDLEY).

He also recorded alternative arms:

1 and 2 HENDLEY; 3, Argent, a chevron flory counter-flory vert between three bulls' heads erased sable, horned or, an annulet for difference (BOWYER); 4, Argent, a bend counter compony or and gules (VAUX).

Crests: 1. A martlet rising or. 2. A hind lodged or.
