= Sedley =

Sedley may refer to:

Surname

- Sedley (surname)

Given name

- Sedley Alley (1955–2006), convicted of abducting, raping, and murdering 19-year-old Suzanne Marie Collins
- Sedley Andrus, LVO (1915–2009), long-serving English officer of arms who was Beaumont Herald of Arms Extraordinary
- Sedley Cooper (born 1911), former professional footballer
- Sedley Cudmore, B.A., M.A., (1878–1945), Canadian economist, academic, civil servant and Canada's second Dominion Statistician

Places

- Sedley, Indiana, an unincorporated community in Porter County, United States
- Sedley, Saskatchewan, village in Saskatchewan, south-east of Regina, Saskatchewan, Canada
- Sedley, Virginia, unincorporated community in the middle of Southampton County, Virginia, United States

Other

- Sedley Baronets in the County of Kent, was created in the Baronetage of England on 29 June 1611
- Sedley Place, independent design agency based in Clapham, London
- Sedley Taylor Road, road in west Cambridge, England
