= Richard Clements =

Richard Clements may refer to:

- Richard Clements (journalist) (1928–2006), UK journalist, former editor of Tribune
- Richard Clements (painter) (1951–1999), Australian painter
- Richard Clements, American wrestler, ring name Quicksilver

== See also ==
- Dick Clement (born 1937), English writer
- Richard Clement (courtier), English courtier
- Richard Clement (cricketer), English cricketer
