= Charles Sedley (disambiguation) =

Charles Sedley may refer to:

- Sir Charles Sedley, 5th Baronet (1639-1701), dramatist, wit and politician
- Sir Charles Sedley, 1st Baronet, of Southwell (c. 1695-1730) of the Sedley baronets of South Fleet, illegitimate son of Sir Charles Sedley, 5th Baronet
- Sir Charles Sedley, 2nd Baronet (c. 1721-1778), MP, grandson of Sir Charles Sedley, 5th Baronet
- Sir Charles Sedley, 4th Baronet (died 1702) of the Sedley baronets of Great Chart
- Sir Charles Sedley, 8th Baronet (died c. 1770) of the Sedley baronets of Great Chart
