= Sedley (surname) =

Sedley is a surname, and may refer to:

- Amelia Sedley, fictional character from the novel Vanity Fair by William Makepeace Thackeray
- Catherine Sedley, Countess of Dorchester (1657–1717), mistress of King James II
- Sir Charles Sedley, 2nd Baronet (1721–1778), British politician
- Sir Charles Sedley, 5th Baronet (1639–1701), English wit, dramatist and politician, and Speaker of the House of Commons
- David Sedley (born 1947), the seventh Laurence Professor of Ancient Philosophy at Cambridge University
- Kate Sedley, the pen-name of Brenda Margaret Lilian Honeyman Clarke (1926–2022), English historical novelist
- Stephen Sedley, (born 1939), (The Rt. Hon. Lord Justice Sedley), a judge of the Court of Appeal of England and Wales
- William Sedley, High Sheriff of Kent in 1547
