= Thomas Hendley =

Thomas Hendley may refer to:

- Thomas Holbein Hendley (1847–1917), British medical officer and amateur authority on Indian art
- Sir Thomas Hendley (1580–1656), English landholder
