= Maurice Atherton =

British Army officer

Maurice Alan Atherton
- Born: 9 October 1926; Barnsley, South Yorkshire
- Died: 15 July 2019 (aged 92); Barham, Kent
- Military career
- Allegiance: United Kingdom
- Branch: British Army
- Service years: 1946–1981
- Rank: Brigadier
- Nickname: The Gripper
- Service number: 365090
- Unit: East Yorkshire Regiment
- Commands: 1st Battalion, Green Howards
- Conflicts: Malayan Emergency
- Awards: Commander of the Order of the British Empire

Brigadier Maurice Alan Atherton CBE (9 October 1926 – 15 July 2019) was a British Army officer who saw active service in the Far East and Middle East. As a ceremonial officer, Atherton held the position of High Sheriff of Kent from 1983 to 1984. He was also Vice Lord Lieutenant of Kent from 2000 to 2002.

== Military career ==
Educated at St John's School, Leatherhead and the Staff College, Camberley. Atherton was commissioned to the East Yorkshire Regiment in 1946 and later served in Egypt, Sudan, British Malaya, Austria and Germany. He became military assistant to the Commander of British Forces Overseas Hong Kong, chief instructor of the Royal Military Academy Sandhurst, Commanding Officer of the Green Howards, Commander of Shorncliffe garrison (1976 to 1981) and Deputy Constable of Dover Castle.

== Public service ==
Atherton was a Deputy Lieutenant of Kent, a Dover Magistrate, County president of the Royal British Legion and was a former president of The Dover Society. He was an honorary life member of the Cinque Ports Mayors' Association.

== Personal life ==
He was the son of Reverend Harold Atherton. His mother was Maria B Shaw. He married Gwendolene Upton in Yorkshire during 1954. They had two children. His wife Wendi played a pivotal role in entertaining the Queen Elizabeth The Queen Mother when she was ordained as Lord Warden of the Cinque Ports in 1979. He was chairman of the governing body of Canterbury Christ Church University from 1994 to 1999 and oversaw the institution's transition to university status. In 1996 he was awarded a doctorate in civil law. Upon his death, a service was held at Canterbury Cathedral on 23 September 2019, with a eulogy given by the former Dean of Canterbury, Robert Willis.
