= Fytche baronets =

Extinct baronetcy in the Baronetage of England

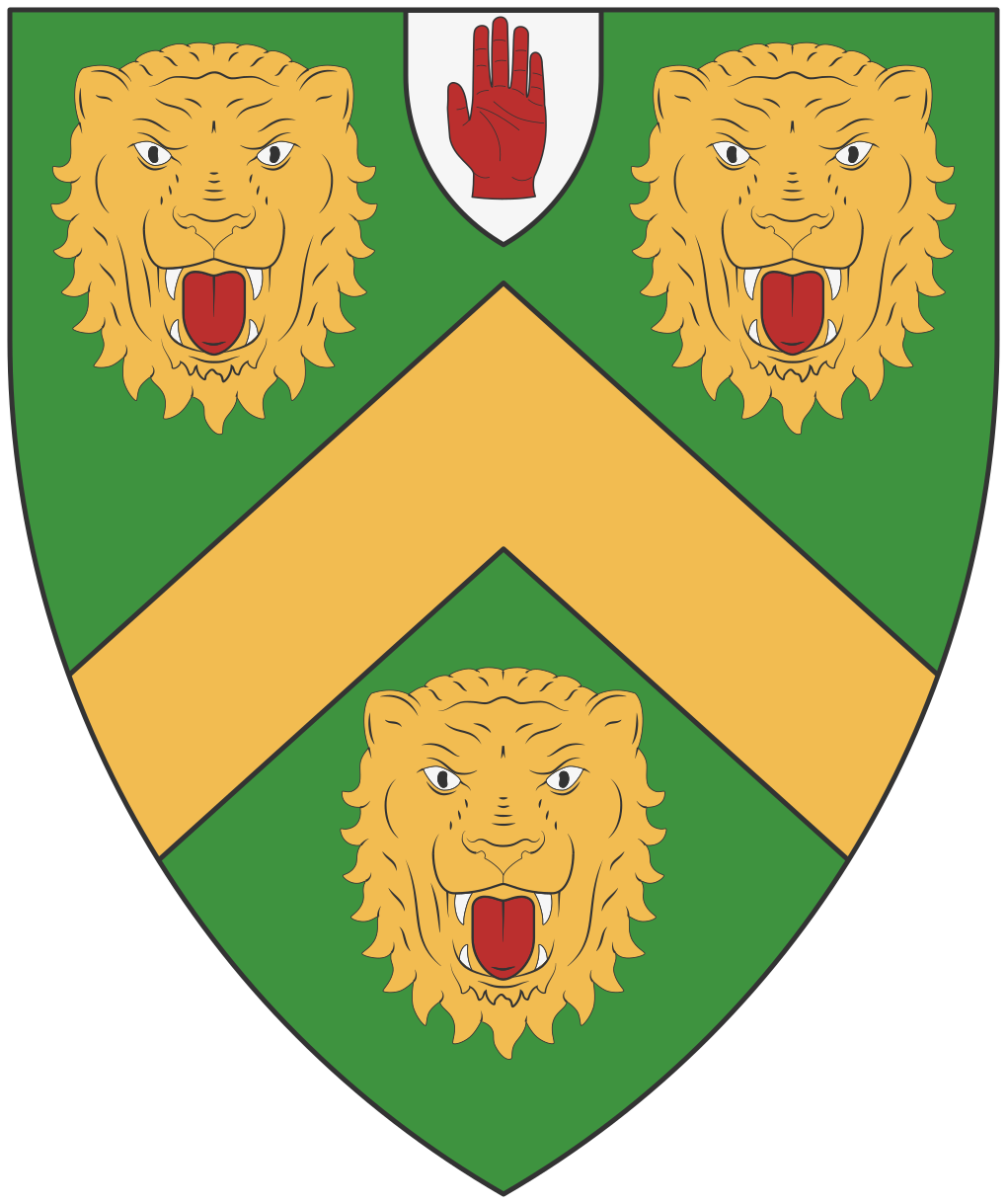
The coat of arms of Fytche of Eltham, Baronets.

The Fytche Baronetcy, of Eltham in the County of Kent, was a title in the Baronetage of England. It was created on 7 September 1688 for Thomas Fytche, of Mount Markfall, Eltham, Kent. He died nine days after his preferment. His son, the second Baronet, was High Sheriff of Kent in 1709. The baronetcy became extinct on the death, without issue, of the third Baronet in 1736. The estate passed to Alice Fytche, daughter of the second Baronet, who in 1740 married Sir John Barker Bt of Grimston Hall and to their son John Fytche Barker.

== Fytche baronets, of Eltham (1688) ==
- Sir Thomas Fytche, 1st Baronet (1637–1688)
- Sir Comport Fytche, 2nd Baronet (1676–1720)
- Sir William Fytche, 3rd Baronet (1704–1736)
