= Hendley baronets =

Extinct baronetcy in the Baronetage of England

The Hendley Baronetcy, of Cuckfield in the County of Sussex, was a title in the Baronetage of England.

The title was created on 8 April 1661 for Walter Hendley. The title became extinct on his death in 1675. Sir Thomas Hendley, father of the first Baronet, was High Sheriff of Kent in 1637. Armorials of Hendley: Paly bendy gules and azure, an orle of martlets or.

== Hendley baronets, of Cuckfield (1661) ==
- Sir Walter Hendley, 1st Baronet (died 1675)
