= John Darell =

John Darell or Darrell may refer to:

- Sir John Darell, 1st Baronet (d. c. 1657), of the Darell baronets, High Sheriff of Berkshire
- John Darell (died 1438), MP and Sheriff for Kent
- John Darell (died 1694), MP for Maidstone and Rye
- John Darrell, Puritan
- Johnny Darrell, singer
