= John Wheeler-Bennett =

English historian (1902–1975)

- Born: 13 October 1902; Kent, United Kingdom
- Died: 9 December 1975 (aged 73); London, United Kingdom
- Occupation: Historian
- Known for: English historian of German and diplomatic history
- Notable work: The Nemesis of Power (1953) and official biography of George VI
- Spouse: Ruth Risher (m. 1945)
- Father: John Wheeler-Bennett (businessman)

Sir John Wheeler Wheeler-Bennett GCVO CMG OBE FBA FRSL (13 October 1902 – 9 December 1975) was a conservative English historian of German and diplomatic history, and the official biographer of King George VI. He was well known in his lifetime, and his interpretation of the role of the German Army influenced a number of British historians.

== Early life ==
Wheeler-Bennett was born in Kent, the son of the prosperous importer John Wheeler-Bennett and his Canadian-born wife, Christine (née McNutt). He was educated at Wellington House school in Westgate-on-Sea near Margate in Kent, and then at Malvern College, and did not regard his youth as a happy one. His health was poor; he did not attend university or join the military.

In the early 1920s he worked as an aide to Major-General Sir Neill Malcolm in the Middle East and Berlin, then from 1923 to 1924 was in the publicity department of the League of Nations in Geneva. After that, he was appointed as director of the information department of the Royal Institute of International Affairs and was editor of its Bulletin of International News between 1924 and 1932.

== Wheeler-Bennett and Pre-War Nazi Germany ==
Wheeler-Bennett lived in Germany between 1927 and 1934 and witnessed at first-hand the final years of the Weimar Republic and the rise of Nazi Germany. During his time in Berlin, he became an unofficial agent and advisor to the British government on international events. He also enjoyed some success as a horse-breeder.

In 1933, Wheeler-Bennett told the Royal Institute of International Affairs:

Hitler, I am convinced, does not want a war. He is susceptible to reason in matters of foreign policy. He is greatly anxious to make Germany self-respecting and is himself anxious to be respectable. He may be described as the most moderate member of his party.

Wheeler-Bennett abandoned this view after reading Mein Kampf, which caused him to recognize that Hitler had more radical goals. He published a biography of Generalfeldmarschall Paul von Hindenburg, and his book The Forgotten Peace was a study of the Treaty of Brest-Litovsk of 1918.

In the years before the Second World War, Wheeler-Bennett befriended or was on speaking terms with a number of significant people in Europe. He had contact with John F Kennedy, Heinrich Brüning, Basil Liddell Hart, Franz von Papen, Lord Tweedsmuir, Carl Friedrich Goerdeler, Leon Trotsky, Hans von Seeckt, Max Hoffmann, Lewis Bernstein Namier, Benito Mussolini, Robert Bruce Lockhart, Karl Radek, Sir Robert Vansittart, Kurt von Schleicher, Isaiah Berlin, Tomáš Masaryk, Engelbert Dollfuss, the former Kaiser Wilhelm II, Adam von Trott zu Solz, Louis Barthou, Lord Lothian, Winston Churchill, and Edvard Beneš.

After the war, Wheeler-Bennett was a critic of Appeasement, and ten years after the Munich Agreement he wrote a book condemning it.

== Wartime and post-war career as a government official ==
In 1939, Wheeler-Bennett went to the United States to serve as a lecturer on international relations at the University of Virginia. He was strongly pro-American, and the South was always his favourite part of the United States.

From 1940 onward, Wheeler-Bennett helped to establish the British Information Service in New York City, an agency charged with trying to persuade the United States to enter the war on the Allied side and better present the British case to the US press. He was a supporter of the German Resistance to Hitler and became friendly with Adam von Trott zu Solz.

In 1942, Wheeler-Bennett returned home to take up a position in the Political Warfare Department of the British government's Foreign Office in London. He was promoted to Assistant Director General of the Political Intelligence Department, later serving in the Political Adviser's Department in SHAEF in 1944–1945. In 1945–1946, he assisted the British prosecutors at the Nuremberg Trials.

== Views on the German Resistance ==
As a member of the Foreign Office's Political Intelligence Department, Wheeler-Bennett wrote on 25 July 1944 that:

It may now be said with some definiteness that we are better off with things as they are today than if the plot of 20 July had succeeded and Hitler had been assassinated... By the failure of the plot we have been spared the embarrassments, both at home and in the United States, which might have resulted from such a move, and, moreover, the present purge [by the Gestapo] is presumably removing from the scene numerous individuals which might have caused us difficulty, not only had the plot succeeded, but also after the defeat of Nazi Germany... The Gestapo and the SS have done us an appreciable service in removing a selection of those who would undoubtedly have posed as 'good' Germans after the war... It is to our advantage therefore that the purge should continue, since the killing of Germans by Germans will save us from future embarrassment of many kinds."

Wheeler-Bennett's views on Germany and the German Resistance caused unease to some of his wartime colleagues, and an internal paper of his of February 1944 was condemned by Professor Thomas Marshall, of the Foreign Office Research Department, as a "vitriolic little paper" and "hardly worthy of its distinguished author."

== Career after 1945 ==
In 1945 Wheeler-Bennett married an American, Ruth Risher, and after the end of the Second World War they settled at Garsington Manor, near Oxford. Despite his lack of a university education and his non-academic status as a historian, Wheeler-Bennett was appointed to teach International Relations at St Antony's College and also taught at New College, Oxford, from 1946 to 1950.

In 1946 the British government's Foreign Office appointed Wheeler-Bennett as the British editor-in-chief of Documents on German Foreign Policy. This publication was based on the captured archives of the German Foreign Office, which had fallen into British and American hands in April 1945, and was a tripartite project of British, American, and French historians. In 1947, in his capacity as editor-in-chief Wheeler-Bennett convened a group called the Joint Consultative Committee. Its self-defined task was to advise the British Foreign Office on all matters pertaining to captured German records. Wheeler-Bennett himself was adamantly opposed to returning any captured records to Germany, and the committee complied with this policy. The project was reconstituted in 1959, after which the West Germans continued it on a quadripartite basis under the title Akten zur deutschen Auswaertigen Politik.

After the death of King George VI in 1952 Wheeler-Bennett was appointed as his official biographer, and his biography appeared in 1958. In History in Our Time, David Cannadine criticized the book as "courtly and obsequious", the history of "an icon rather than of an individual," and a "sanitised sarcophagus".

== The Nemesis of Power ==
Wheeler-Bennett was best known for his The Nemesis of Power (1953), which documented the German Army's involvement in politics and reiterated Wheeler-Bennet's hostile views on the German Resistance. His thesis was that under Seeckt's leadership during the Weimar period, the Reichswehr had formed a "State within the State" that largely preserved its autonomy from the politicians in Berlin, but did not, however, play an active role in day-to-day politics.

After Seeckt's downfall in 1926, which had been engineered by Schleicher, the Reichswehr became increasingly engaged in political intrigues. In Wheeler-Bennett's view, Schleicher was the "Gravedigger of the Weimar Republic" who succeeded in undermining democracy but failed completely to build any sort of stable structure in its place. Thus, by a mixture of cunning, intrigue, and inept manoeuvres, Schleicher had inadvertently paved the way for Adolf Hitler.

In 1964 a revised edition of The Nemesis of Power appeared, in which Wheeler-Bennett continued his narrative up to the 20 July Plot of 1944. He contended that under the leadership of Werner von Blomberg and Werner von Fritsch, the German Army had chosen to acquiesce to the Nazi regime as the kind of government best able to achieve what the Army wanted; namely a militarised society that would ensure in the next war that there would be no repeat of the "stab in the back" (an explanation of the collapse of Germany in November 1918 supported by Hitler and others). By agreeing to support the Nazi dictatorship, the Army had tolerated a regime that quietly and gradually dismantled the "State within the state". After Blomberg's and Fritsch's fall in 1938, the Army had increasingly become a tool of the Nazi regime rather than the independent actor that it had been before. Despite his hostility to the German generals, in the book Wheeler-Bennett acknowledged the courage of Claus von Stauffenberg and others. Overall, he concluded that the conservative opposition within the Wehrmacht had done too little, too late, to overthrow the Nazis.

He was also critical of Germany's largest right-wing party before the Nazi era, the German National People's Party, saying that their failure to accept the Weimar Republic was "more influenced by feelings of disloyalty to the Republic than of loyalty to the Kaiser," and ultimately led them to prop up Hitler.

== Final decades ==
An Anglican, Wheeler-Bennett enjoyed life in the English countryside. In 1958 he became founding chairman of the Ditchley Foundation, the Anglo-American conference group. From 1959 until his death he served as historical adviser to the Royal Archives. In 1972 he was elected to the British Academy.

Wheeler-Bennett was a follower of the Great Man school of history, and his writings usually explained historical events in terms of the leading personalities of the period. This view of history, together with his own conservative outlook, inclined him to make Winston Churchill a principal hero of his writings, as shown in his well-illustrated book The History Makers: Leaders And Statesmen of The 20th Century (1973).

Sir John Wheeler-Bennett died of cancer in London on 9 December 1975, aged 73.

== Cultural depictions ==
Wheeler-Bennett was portrayed by Tristan Sturrock in season 2, episode 6 ("Vergangenheit") of the historical drama television series The Crown (2017).

== Works ==
- Information on the Reduction of Armaments, with an introduction by Major-General Sir Neill L. Malcolm, 1925. online edition
- Information on the Renunciation of War, 1927–1928 with an introduction by Philip H. Kerr, 1928. online edition
- Disarmament And Security Since Locarno 1925–1931; Being The Political And Technical Background of the General Disarmament Conference, 1932, New York: Macmillan, 1932.
- The Wreck of Reparations, Being The Political Background of the Lausanne Agreement, 1932, 1933. online edition
- Documents On International Affairs: 1933 editor online
- The Pipe Dream Of Peace: The Story Of The Collapse Of Disarmament, William Morrow and Company, 1935. online edition
- Hindenburg: The Wooden Titan, London: Macmillan and Company, 1936. online free
- Brest-Litovsk: The Forgotten Peace, March 1918, 1938. online free
- The Treaty of Brest-Litovsk and Germany's Eastern Policy, Clarendon Press, 1939.
- The Defeat of the German Army, 1918, with Cyril Falls, Special Service Division: Army Service Forces, 1943.
- Munich: Prologue To Tragedy, 1948.
- The Nemesis Of Power: The German Army In Politics, 1918–1945, 1953, revised edition 1964. online free
- King George VI, His Life and Reign, St. Martin's Press, 1958. online free
- John Anderson, Viscount Waverley, St. Martin's Press, 1962. online edition
- A Wreath To Clio: Studies In British, American and German Affairs, St. Martin's Press, 1967. online edition
- Action This Day; Working With Churchill. Memoirs by Lord Norman Brook (And Others), edited with an introduction by Sir John Wheeler-Bennett, London: Macmillan and Co., 1968.
- The Semblance Of Peace: The Political Settlement After The Second World War, with Anthony Nicholls, W.W. Norton and Company, 1972. excerpt
- The History Makers: Leaders And Statesmen of The 20th Century, edited by Lord Frank Pakenham Longford and Sir John Wheeler-Bennett, chronologies and editorial assistance by Christine Nicholls, New York: St. Martin's Press, 1973.
- Knaves, Fools And Heroes: In Europe Between The Wars, (Macmillan, 1974). online edition; autobiography vol 1
- Special Relationships: America In Peace And War, New York: Macmillan, 1975. autobiography

vol 2 online edition;

- Friends, Enemies, And Sovereigns, New York: Macmillan, 1976 online free; autobiography vol 3
