= John Wheeler-Bennett (businessman) =

British import merchant, public servant and philanthropist

John Wheeler-Bennett CBE JP
- Born: 1840
- Died: 25 June 1926 (aged 85–86); Ravensbourne, Keston, Kent, England
- Occupations: Import merchant, public servant, philanthropist
- Spouse: Christine McNutt (m. 1882)
- Children: 2, including historian John Wheeler-Bennett

John Wheeler-Bennett CBE JP (1840 – 25 June 1926) was a British import merchant, public servant and philanthropist. He was the father of British historian Sir John Wheeler-Bennett.

== Early life ==
Wheeler-Bennett was educated at Mr Vickery's School in Portsmouth, a private preparatory school for boys wishing to enter the Royal Navy.

== Career ==
For forty years until his retirement in 1922 he ran an import business from offices at Hibernia Chambers, London Bridge, with major interests in Canada, the United States, Argentina and Denmark. He was chairman of the London Home and Foreign Exchange in 1913. He was also a director of the Metropolitan Railway and chairman of its surplus lands committee.

During World War I, Wheeler-Bennett chaired the finance committee of the Kent County War Fund of the British Red Cross Society, which administered nearly a hundred Voluntary Aid Detachment hospitals. For this service he was appointed Commander of the Order of the British Empire (CBE) on 1 January 1920. He also served on the City of London Military Advisory Committee, chaired the Bromley Rural Tribunal, and was joint treasurer of the Royal Naval Ports Church Building Fund established in 1912.

Wheeler-Bennett served as High Sheriff of Kent from 1922 to 1924. He donated £10,000 to the Kent County Ophthalmic Hospital at Maidstone in 1923. He was also a justice of the peace.

== Personal life ==
In 1882, he married Christine Hill McNutt of Truro, Nova Scotia. They had two sons, including the historian Sir John Wheeler-Bennett, and a daughter, Constance Irene. Wheeler-Bennett died from heart failure on 25 June 1926 at his home in Ravensbourne, Keston, Kent.
