= Ightham Mote =

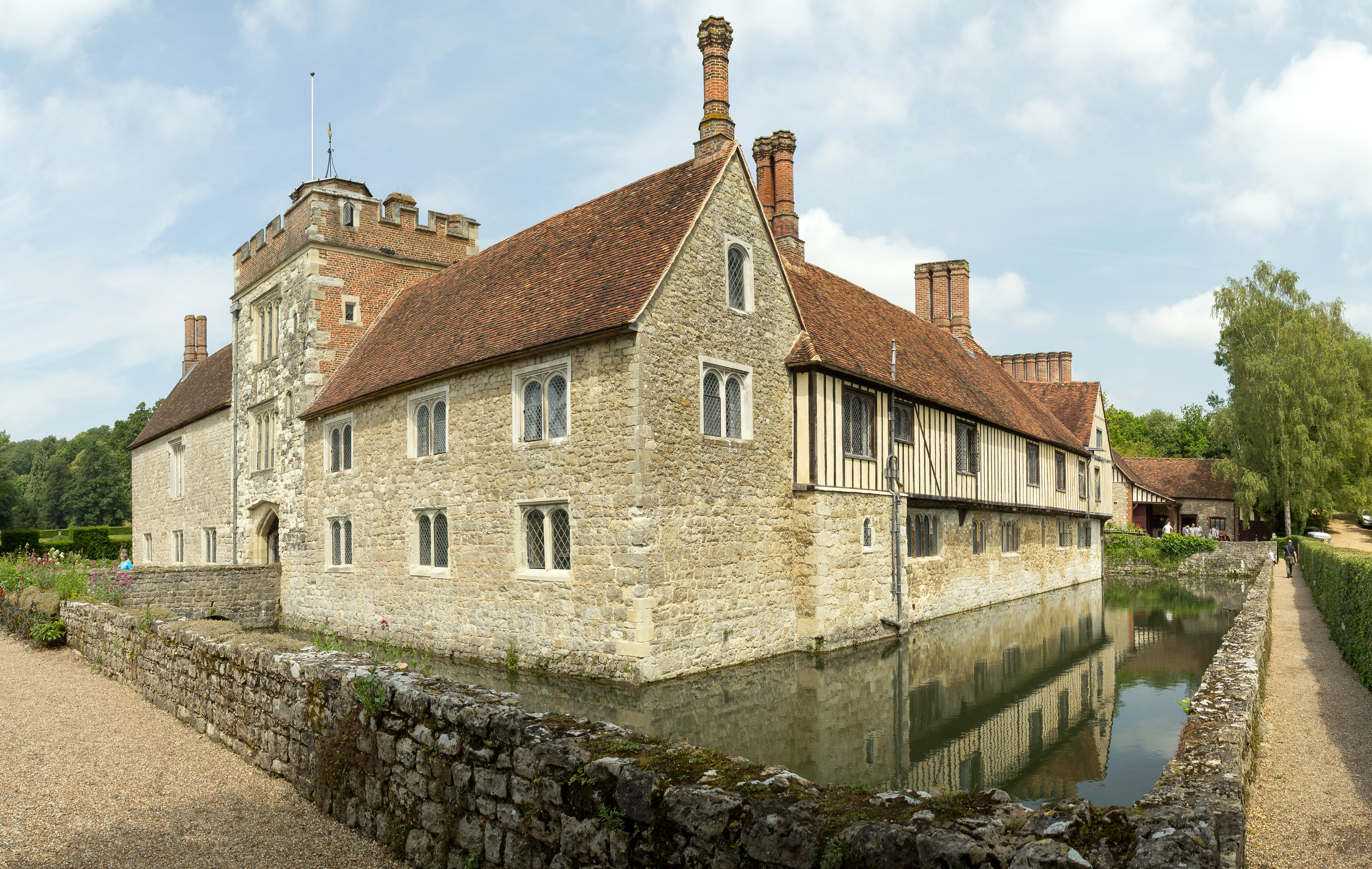

- Location within Kent
- 51.2585°N 0.2698°E
- Type: House
- Location: Ightham, Kent

History
- Built: Medieval

Site notes
- Architectural style: Vernacular
- Governing body: National Trust

Listed Building – Grade I
- Official name: Ightham Mote
- Designated: 1 August 1952
- Reference no.: 1362410

Ightham Mote (/ˈaɪtəm ˈmoʊt/), at Ightham, is a medieval moated manor house in Kent, England. The architectural writer John Newman describes it as "the most complete small medieval manor house in the county".

Ightham Mote and its gardens are owned by the National Trust and are open to the public. The house is a Grade I listed building, and parts of it are a Scheduled Ancient Monument.

== History ==
=== 14th century–16th century ===
The origins of the house date from circa 1340–1360. The earliest recorded owner is Sir Thomas Cawne, who fought in France with Edward the Black Prince and who acquired the Mote in the 1360s. He died in 1374 and there is a memorial to him in St Peter’s Church. In 1399 on the death of his son Robert the house passed by the marriage of Robert’s daughter Alice to Nicholas Haute and their descendants, their grandson Richard Haute being Sheriff of Kent in the late 15th century. It was then purchased in 1521 by the courtier Sir Richard Clement (d.1538). In 1591, Sir William Selby bought the estate.

=== 16th century-late 19th century ===
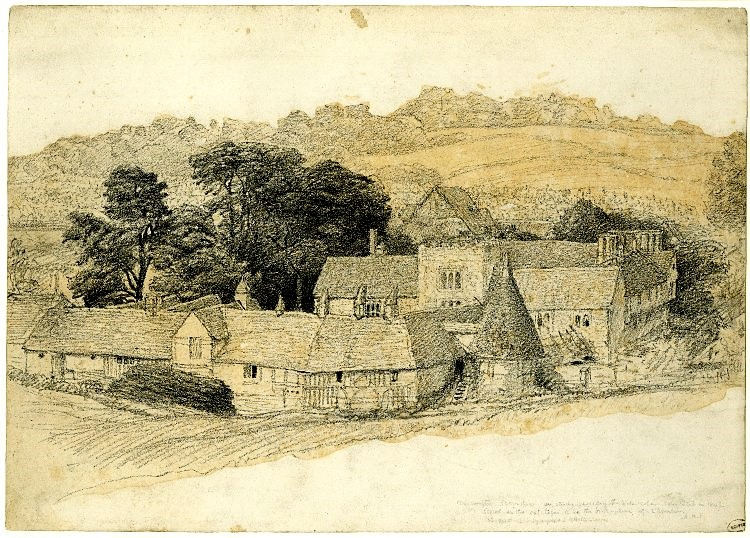
Ightham Mote c.1828, brownwash painting by Samuel Palmer. Note that part of the building had been converted to an oast house.

The house remained in the Selby family for nearly 300 years. Sir William was succeeded by his nephew, also Sir William, who is notable for handing over the keys of Berwick-upon-Tweed to James I on his way south to succeed to the throne. He married Dorothy Bonham of West Malling but had no children. The Selbys continued until the mid-19th century when the line faltered with Elizabeth Selby, the widow of a Thomas who disinherited his only son. During her reclusive tenure, Joseph Nash drew the house for his multi-volume illustrated history Mansions of England in the Olden Time, published in the 1840s. A brownwash watercolour painting dated c.1828 by Samuel Palmer shows that part of the building had been converted to an oast house.

The house passed to a cousin, Prideaux John Selby, a distinguished naturalist, sportsman and scientist. On his death in 1867 he left the house to his daughter Lewis Marianne Bigge. Her second husband, Robert Luard (with whom she had two children, including the organist Bertram Luard-Selby, who had been born at Ightham Mote), changed his name to Luard-Selby. Ightham Mote was rented in 1887 to the American railway magnate William Jackson Palmer and his family and for three years became a centre for artists and writers of the Aesthetic Movement, with visitors including John Singer Sargent, Henry James and Ellen Terry. When Mrs Bigge died in 1889, the executors of her son Charles Selby-Bigge, a Shropshire land agent, put the house up for sale in July 1889.

=== Late 19th century-21st century ===
The Mote was purchased in 1889 by Sir Thomas Colyer-Fergusson. He and his wife brought up their six children at the Mote. In 1890–1891, he carried out much repair and restoration, which allowed the survival of the house after centuries of neglect. Ightham Mote was opened to the public one afternoon a week in the early 20th century.

Sir Thomas Colyer-Fergusson's third son, Riversdale, died aged 21 in 1917 at the Third Battle of Ypres, and was awarded a posthumous Victoria Cross. A wooden cross in the New Chapel is in his memory. The oldest brother, Max, was killed at the age of 49 in a bombing raid on an army driving school near Tidworth in 1940 during World War II. One of the three daughters, Mary (called Polly) married Walter Monckton.

On Sir Thomas's death in 1951, the property and the baronetcy passed to Max's son, James. The high costs of upkeep and repair of the house led him to sell the house and auction most of the contents. The sale took place in October 1951 and lasted three days. It was suggested that the house be demolished to harvest the lead on the roofs, or that it be divided into flats. Three local men purchased the house: William Durling, John Goodwin and John Baldock. They paid £5,500 for the freehold, in the hope of being able to secure the future of the house.

In 1953, Ightham Mote was purchased by Charles Henry Robinson, an American of Portland, Maine, United States. He had known the property from vacations in England during the 1920s, and many years later happened to see the house for sale in Country Life. He lived there for only fourteen weeks a year for tax reasons. He made many urgent repairs, and partly refurnished the house with 17th-century English pieces. In 1965, he announced that he would give Ightham Mote and its contents to the National Trust. He died in 1985 and his ashes were immured just outside the crypt. The National Trust took possession in that year.

In 1989, the National Trust began an ambitious conservation project that involved dismantling much of the building and recording its construction methods before rebuilding it. During this process, the effects of centuries of ageing, weathering, and the destructive effect of the deathwatch beetle were highlighted. The project ended in 2004 after revealing numerous examples of structural and ornamental features which had been covered up by later additions.

== Architecture and description ==
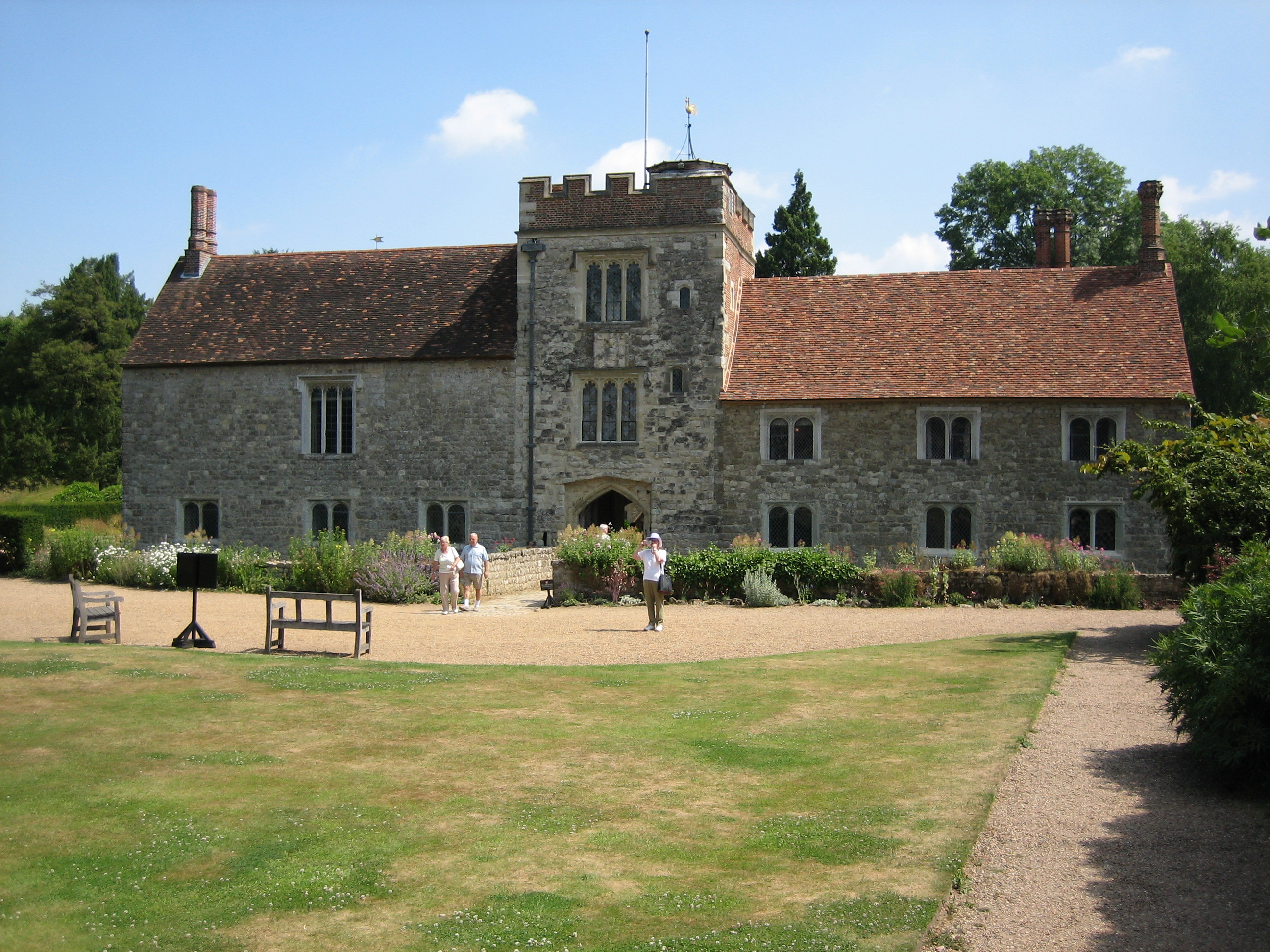
Ightham Mote: the gatehouse rebuilt in the 1480s

Originally dating to around 1320, the building is important because it has most of its original features; successive owners effected relatively few changes to the main structure, after the completion of the quadrangle with a new chapel in the 16th century. Pevsner described it as "the most complete small medieval manor house in the county", and it remains an example that shows how such houses would have looked in the Middle Ages. Unlike most courtyard houses of its type which have had a range demolished so that the house looks outward, Nicholas Cooper observes that Ightham Mote wholly surrounds its courtyard and looks inward, into it, offering little information externally. The construction is of "Kentish ragstone and dull red brick," the buildings of the courtyard having originally been built of timber and subsequently rebuilt in stone.

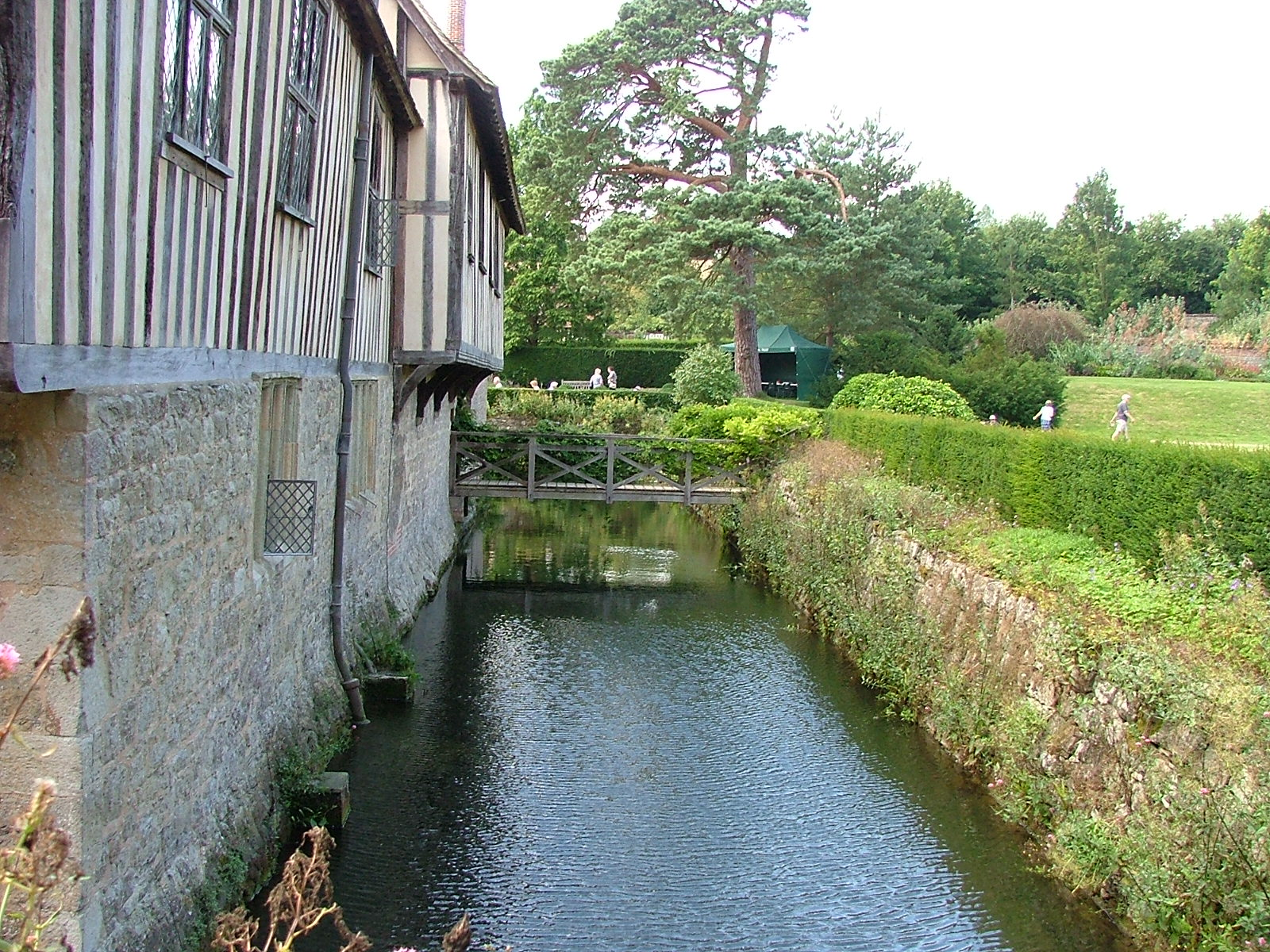
The moat of Ightham Mote

The house has more than 70 rooms, all arranged around a central courtyard, "the confines circumscribed by the moat." The house is surrounded on all sides by a square moat, crossed by three bridges. The earliest surviving evidence is for a house of the early 14th century, with the great hall, to which were attached, at the high, or dais end, the chapel, crypt and two solars. The courtyard was completely enclosed by increments on its restricted moated site, and the battlemented tower was constructed in the 15th century. Very little of the 14th century survives on the exterior behind rebuilding and refacing of the 15th and 16th centuries.

The structures include unusual and distinctive elements, such as the porter's squint, a narrow slit in the wall designed to enable a gatekeeper to examine a visitor's credentials before opening the gate. An open loggia with a fifteenth-century gallery above, connects the main accommodations with the gatehouse range. The courtyard contains a large, 19th century dog kennel. The house contains two chapels; the New Chapel, of c.1520, having a barrel roof decorated with Tudor roses. Parts of the interior were remodelled by Richard Norman Shaw.

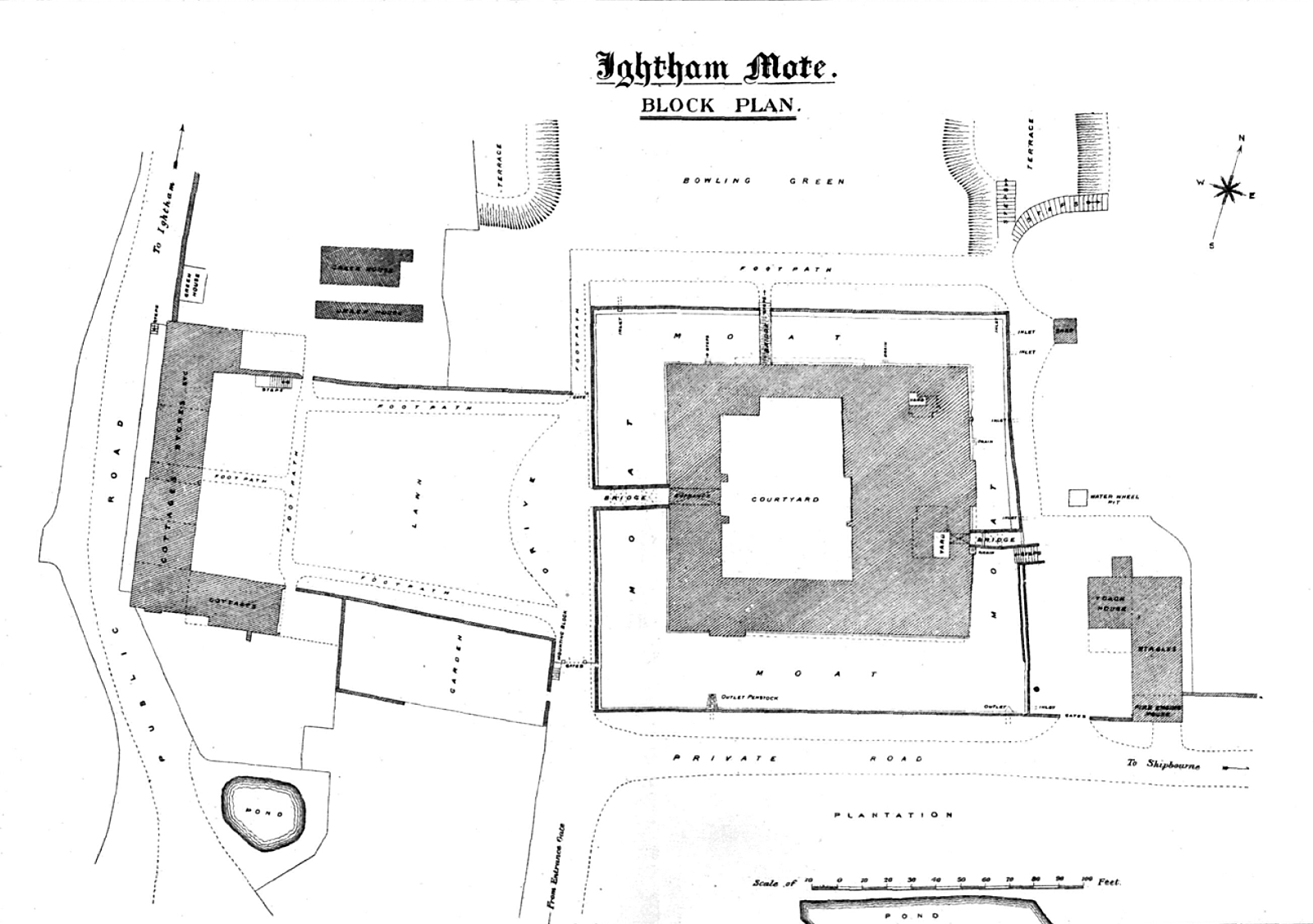
Grounds

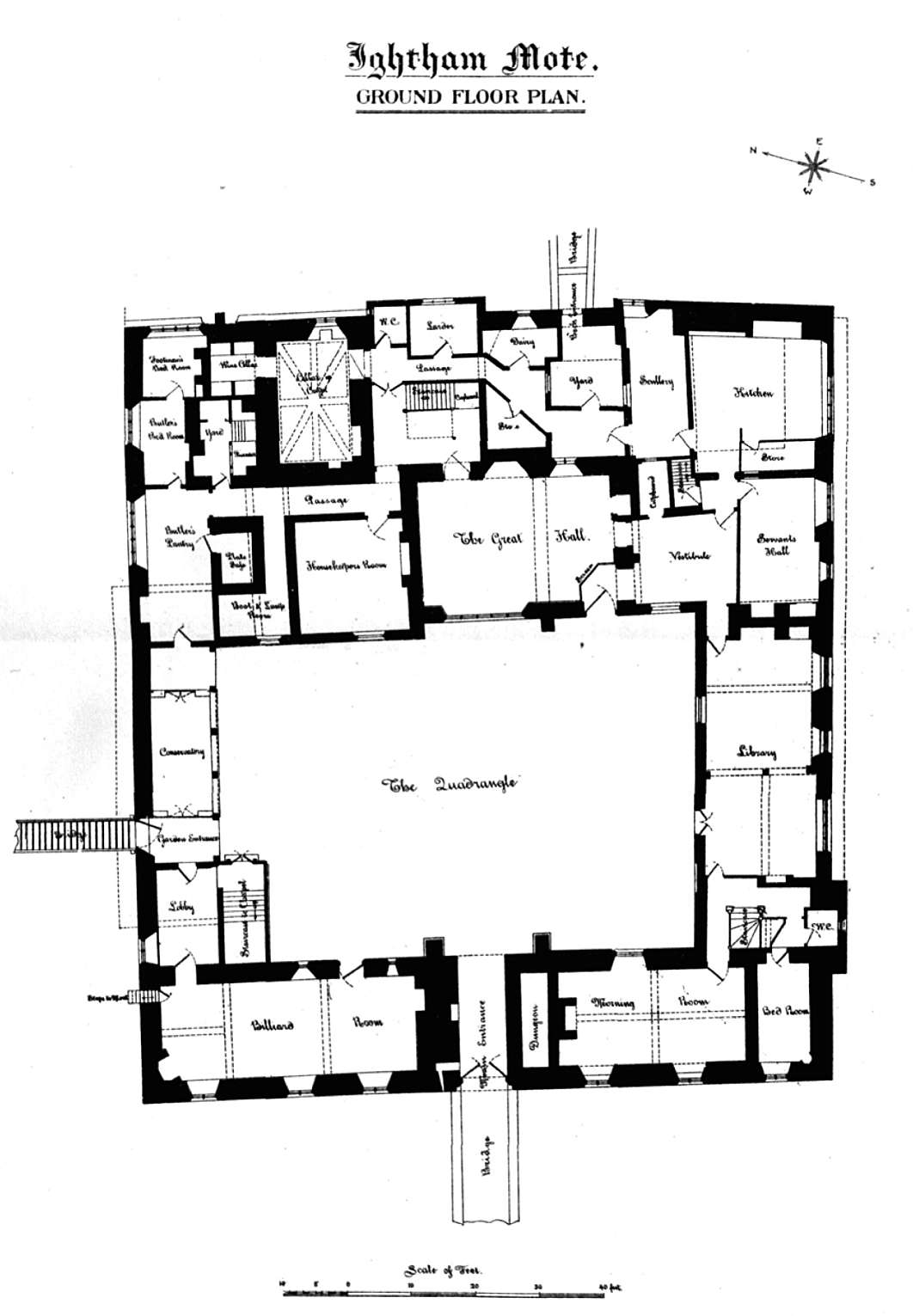
Ground floor plan of main building

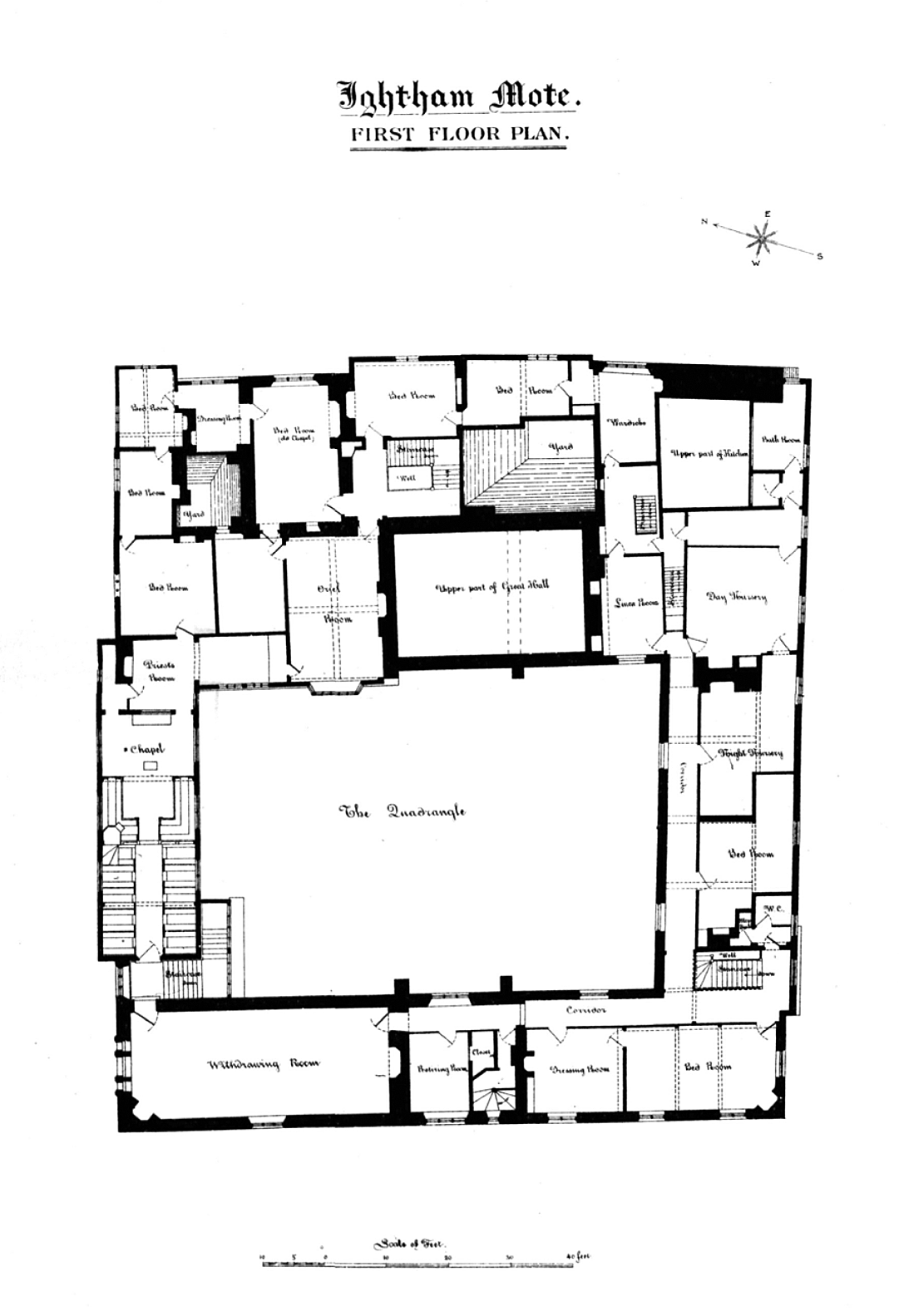
First floor plan

== In literature ==
Much of Anya Seton's novel Green Darkness takes place at Ightham Mote. The novel was inspired by a visit Seton made in 1968. Charles Henry Robinson allowed Seton to access his library and notes for research.

== Sources ==
- Cook, Olive (1984). The English House Through Seven Centuries. London: Penguin. ISBN 9780140067385. "The English House Through Seven Centuries."
- Cooper, Catriona Elizabeth (2014). The exploration of lived experience in medieval buildings through the use of digital technologies (PDF). université de Southampton.
- Cooper, Nicholas (1999). Houses of the Gentry 1480-1680. New Haven and London: Yale University Press. ISBN 9780300073904. OCLC 890145910.
- Grattan, Patrick (2021). Oasts and Hop Kilns, a History. Liverpool and Swindon: Liverpool University Press for Historic England. ISBN 978-1-78962-251-5.
- Newman, John (2012). Kent: West and The Weald. The Buildings of England. New Haven and London: Yale University Press. ISBN 9780300185096.
- Nicolson, Nigel (1998). Ightham Mote. London: The National Trust. ISBN 9781843591511.
- Wood, Margaret (1996). The English Medieval House. London: Studio Editions. ISBN 9781858911670. OCLC 489870387.
