= Sedley baronets =

Extinct baronetcy in the Baronetage of England

Sir Charles Sedley, 2nd Baronet, of Southfleet

There have been three baronetcies created for members of the Sedley (otherwise Sidley) family of Kent, all in the Baronetage of England. All three creations are extinct

All the baronets descend from the 15th century family of Aylesford and Scadbury, Southfleet and from William Sedley of Southfleet who was High Sheriff of Kent in 1546.

The Baronetcy of Sedley of Aylesford in the County of Kent, was created in the Baronetage of England on 29 June 1611 for William Sedley of The Friars, Aylesford. He was high sheriff of the county in 1589. His son, the second Baronet, was high sheriff in 1621. He was succeeded in turn by his three sons, the third of whom, the fifth Baronet, was a politician, wit and dramatist. His only legitimate child was Catherine Sedley, Countess of Dorchester, mistress of James II. The title became extinct on his death in 1701.

The Baronetcy Sedley of Great Chart in the County of Kent, was created in the Baronetage of England on 24 September 1621 for Isaack Sedley, a grandson of the 1st Baronet of Aylesford by his third son Nicholas. He was high sheriff of Kent in 1626. The title became extinct on the death of the eighth Baronet in circa 1770.

The Baronetcy Sedley of Southfleet in the County of Kent, was created in the Baronetage of England on 10 July 1702 for Charles Sedley, the grandson of the fifth Baronet of Aylesford by an illegitimate son, Charles. The second Baronet sat as Member of Parliament for Nottingham. The title became extinct on his death in 1778.

== Sedley baronets, of Ailesford (1611) ==
Escutcheon of the Sedley baronets of Ailesford

- Sir William Sedley, 1st Baronet (c. 1558–1618)
- Sir John Sedley, 2nd Baronet (c. 1597–1638)
- Sir Henry Sedley, 3rd Baronet (c. 1623–1641)
- Sir William Sedley, 4th Baronet (died 1656)
- Sir Charles Sedley, 5th Baronet (1639–1701)

== Sedley baronets, of Great Chart (1621) ==
- Sir Isaack Sedley, 1st Baronet (died 1627)
- Sir John Sedley, 2nd Baronet (c. 1600–1673)
- Sir Isaac Sedley, 3rd Baronet (died by 1695)
- Sir Charles Sedley, 4th Baronet (died 1702)
- Sir John Sedley, 5th Baronet (c. 1710)
- Sir George Sedley, 6th Baronet (died by 1722)
- Sir George Sedley, 7th Baronet (died 1737)
- Sir Charles Sedley, 8th Baronet (died c. 1770)

== Sedley baronets, of Southfleet (1702) ==
- Sir Charles Sedley, 1st Baronet (c. 1695–1730)
- Sir Charles Sedley, 2nd Baronet (c. 1721–1778)

Baronetage of England
Preceded by Appleton baronets	Sedley baronets 29 June 1611	Succeeded by Twysden baronets
