= Bowyer Hendley =

English landowner and High Sheriff of Kent

Bowyer Hendley was an English landowner who served as High Sheriff of Kent.

== Life ==
Hendley (the name was often written as Henley) was born in 1665, the son of John Hendley (1617-1676), Lord of the Manor of Otham, and his wife Priscilla (1627-1684), daughter of Thomas Fludd / Floyd, owner of Gore Court in Otham. His other grandfather was Sir Thomas Hendley. His arms were "Pale, bendy, azure and gules, eight martlets, three, two, and three, or." In about 1684 he married Mary (1666-1752), daughter of Thomas Sharpe of Benenden.

In 1702 he served as Sheriff of Kent and in 1712 he bought the mansion of Gore Court from his uncle Alabaster Fludd.

His will, made 23 September 1740, was proved on 31 December 1742 and his monument is in St Nicholas's Church, Otham.

== Family ==
Hie eldest son William Hendley (1686-1762) was his heir. His youngest daughter Anne (1697-1787) married the Reverend Samuel Horne (1693-1768), who was presented to the living of Otham in 1727 by his father-in-law, and became the mother of George Horne (bishop).
