= Richard Clement (courtier) =

English courtier

Monumental brass of Sir Richard Clement, Ightham Church, Kent. On his tabard he displays his armorials in inverted shields

Arms of Richard Clement: Argent, two bendlets wavy sable on a chief gules three leopard's faces or a bordure compony or and azure

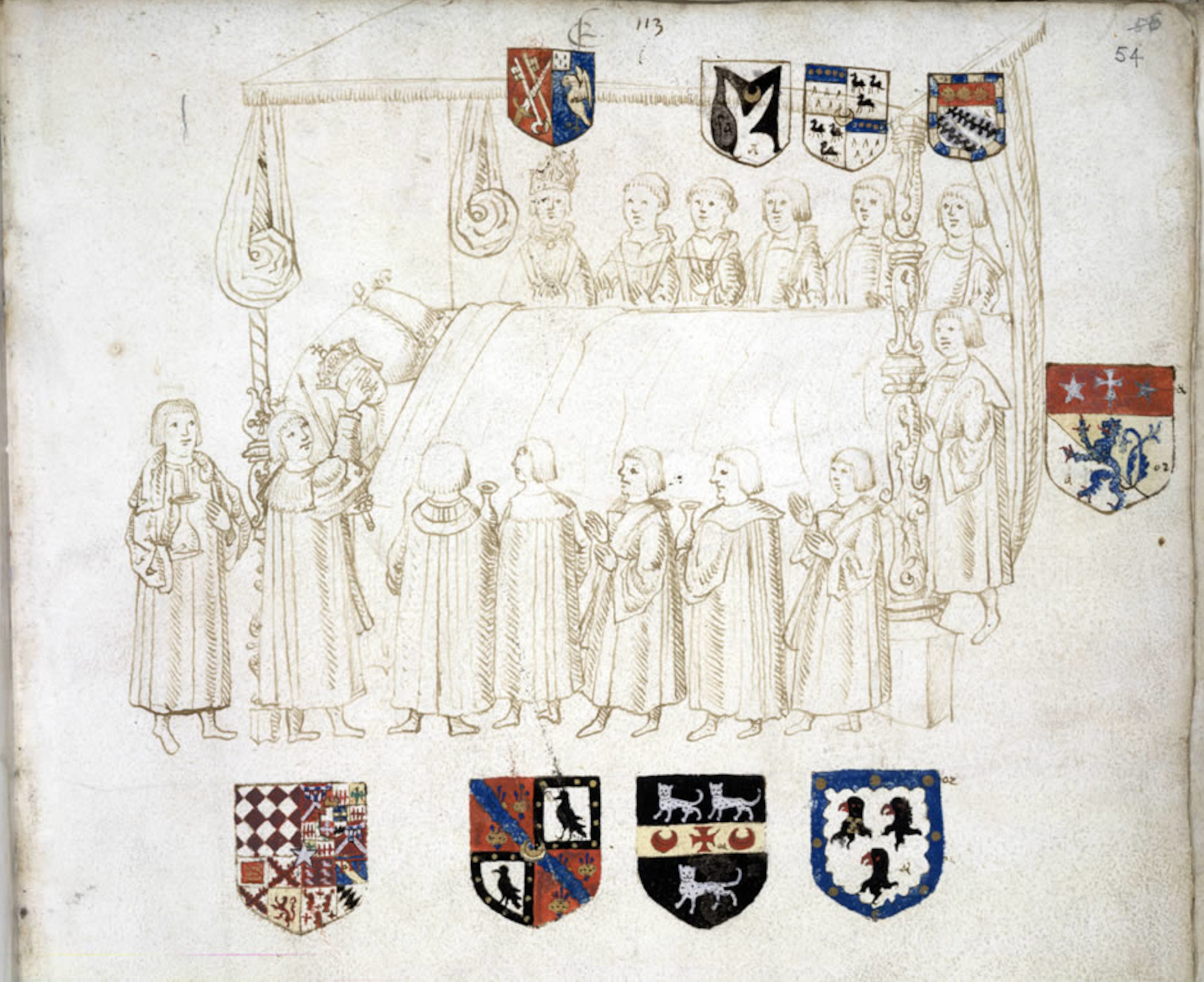
Deathbed of King Henry VII at Richmond Palace (1509), at which Richard Clement is shown (below his identifying coat of arms) 6th on the king's left side, behind fellow courtier Sir Richard Weston. Drawn by Sir Thomas Wriothesley(d.1534), Garter King of Arms, a courtier who though not present on the day, shortly thereafter wrote an account of the proceedings, from discussions with those present. British Library Additional MS 45131, folio 54

Sir Richard Clement (c. 1482-1538) of Ightham Mote in Kent, England, was a courtier to King Henry VII and to his son Henry VIII.

== Origins ==
He was born in about 1482, the only son and heir of William Clement (d.1494) of Bersted in Sussex, a member of a minor gentry family. His uncle, Richard Clement, served as Chamberlain of Pagham and Bailiff of Aldwick Hundred between 1493-5. His mother was a sister of John Goring II of Burton in Sussex. He had four sisters, Alice, Elizabeth, Joan and (probably) Anne.

== Career ==
His career as a courtier started in about 1503-8 as a page of the Privy Chamber to King Henry VII (1485-1509). He was present at the king's death at Richmond Palace, as is recorded in the drawing (British Library Additional MS 45131, folio 54) by Sir Thomas Wriothesley(d.1534), Garter King of Arms, a courtier who though not present on the day, shortly thereafter wrote an account of the proceedings, from discussions with those present. Following the death of Henry VII, he served as a Gentleman Usher to his son King Henry VIII. However soon after the accession of Henry VIII in 1509, having gained no career advancement as a courtier, he moved north to Northamptonshire.

== Purchases Ightham Mote ==
In 1521, having moved south from Northamptonshire, he purchased the estate of Ightham Mote in Kent from Thomas Welles, a clerk, who had acquired it in 1519 from Edward Haute, forced to sell due to financial problems. At the same time he acquired further nearby estates in Shipbourne, Wrotham and Seal. He carried out much building work on his new residence between 1521-9 including reglazing the windows of the great hall, adding a long gallery to connect the two halves of the family quarters, and rebuilding and refronting the private apartments. In the decoration he made liberal use of the royal badges of King Henry VIII and his first wife Katherine of Aragon, thus displaying his loyalty to the Tudor dynasty.

== Assists William Warham ==
In 1528 he assisted his near neighbour at Knole House in Kent William Warham, Archbishop of Canterbury, to fend off "a host of belligerent Kentishmen" demanding repayments from him, and the event appears to have assisted Clement's subsequent rise. He was knighted in 1529 and served as Sheriff of Kent 1531-2. In the opinion of Mercer (1995), Clement's patron was Thomas Boleyn, 1st Earl of Wiltshire, of Hever Castle in Kent, father of Queen Anne Boleyn, and Clement's career suffered after the queen's execution in 1536 and the downfall of her family.

== Imprisoned in Fleet ==
In 1534, following conviction in the Star Chamber, he was imprisoned in the Fleet for having used force, in his capacity as a justice of the peace for Kent, during a property dispute in Shipbourne between the rector and Robert Brenner of Hadlow, a servant of Sir Edward Guildford (father-in-law of John Dudley, 1st Duke of Northumberland). Clement had expelled Brenner with the assistance of a force of 200 men he had raised for the purpose, but the Star Chamber found that he was at fault for not having enquired sufficiently into the case before resorting to force. Clement appears to have been acting against the Guildford faction, formerly the pre-eminent family in Kent until replaced by the Boleyns.

== Marriages & issue ==
He married twice, but had no legitimate issue:

- Firstly, at some time before 1510, to Anne Catesby (d.1528), a daughter of Sir William Catesby of Ashby St Ledgers in Northamptonshire and a sister of Sir William Catesby (1450-1485) (one of King Richard III's principal councillors, Chancellor of the Exchequer and Speaker of the House of Commons) and widow of Robert Whittlebury of Milton in Northamptonshire; without issue;
- Secondly, before 1530, he married Anne Barley (or Barlee) (died 1557/8), widow successively of Sir Robert Sheffield of Butterwick, Lincolnshire, Speaker of the House of Commons and then (as his second wife) of Sir John Grey (will dated 1523) (a younger son of Thomas Grey, 1st Marquess of Dorset and a brother of Thomas Grey, 2nd Marquess of Dorset (d.1530), a favourite of King Henry VIII), whose first wife had been Elizabeth Catesby (sister of Anne Catesby, Clement's first wife), widow of Roger Wake (d.1504) of Blisworth, Northamptonshire, and a daughter of Sir William Catesby of Ashby St Ledgers in Northamptonshire. Without issue.

=== Illegitimate daughters ===
He had three illegitimate daughters:

- Elizabeth, wife of Thomas Lovelace of Kingsdown;
- Anne, wife of Ralph Bosville of Bradbourne;
- Margaret, wife of Nicholas Edwards of Withyham in Sussex.

== Death & burial ==
He died in 1538, between 28 October and 2 December, and was buried in Ightham Church, where survives the upper fragment of his monumental brass, which shows his coat of arms upright in an inverted shield, to indicate his death, an unusual depiction. A separate shield shows the arms of Clement impaling Catesby (Argent, two lions passant sable crowned or). The inscription (with Sir Richard's date of death left blank) is as follows:

Of yo^{r} charite pray for the soules of S^{r} Richard Clement Knyght & Anne his first wyfe daught^{r} of S^{r} Wyll'm Catesby of North'mptonshire Knyght, which Anne decessyd the III^{th} (sic) day of November an^{o} d'm MV^{c}XXVIII^{th} & the sayde Syr Rychard decessyd the .... day of ... an^{o} d'm MV.... o(n) who^{s} soules J(e)h(s)u have m(er)cy

== Sources ==
- Mercer, Malcolm (1995). "Sir Richard Clement, Ightham Mote and Local Disorder in the Early Tudor Period". Archaeologia Cantiana. 115: 155–176.
- Starkey, David, Ightham Mote: Politics and Architecture in Early Tudor England, Archaeologia, Vol.107, 1982, pp. 153–6
