= High Sheriff of Kent =

Ceremonial officer of the English county of Kent

The high sheriff is the oldest secular office under the Crown (prior to 1974 the office previously known as sheriff). Formerly the high sheriff was the principal law enforcement officer in the county but over the centuries most of the responsibilities associated with the post have been transferred elsewhere or are now obsolete, so that its functions are now largely ceremonial. The high sheriff changes every March. The current High Sheriff is Jonathan Neame.

This is a list of high sheriffs of Kent.

== 11th century to 14th century ==
Dates	Name
c. 1040–c. 1044	Eadsige
c. 1051–	Robert of Jumièges
?–1066	Osward
1067–1070	Alain de Buckland (1045–1108)
1070?–1077?	Hugh de Port? (c1015–c1096)
1077–1100	Haimo
1145	Nicholas de Moels
1154	Rualon
1155–1160	Ralph Picot
1161–1166	Hugh of Dovor of Chilham
1167	Richard de Lucy
1168–1174	Gervase de Cornhill
1175	Gervase and Robert Fitz-Bernard
1176–1183	Robert Fitz-Bernard
1184	William son of Nigel of Munevile
1185–1188	Allen of Valoynes of Fremomh
1189–1193	Reginald de Cornhill
1194	William of St Mardal
1195	Walter son of Derman
1196–1209	Reginald de Cornhill
1210–1215	John son of Unam of Selling and Reginald de Cornhill
1216–1222	Hubert de Burgh and Hugh of Windlesores of Warehorne
1223–1225	Hubert de Burgh and Roger Grimston
1226–1231	Hubert of Boroz and William Brito
1232–1238	Bertram of Cryall
1239–1240	Humphrey of Bohun Earl of Essex
1241	Peter of Subaudie and Bertram of Cryall
1242	Bertram of Cryall and John of Cobham
1243–1247	Bertram de Criol
1248–1255	Reginald of Cobham
1256	Walter of Bersted and Reginald of Cobham
1257–1258	Fulk Payferer of Iseling
1259–1261	John of Cobham
1262	Robert Walerand and Thomas Delaway.
1263–1264	Roger de Leybourne
1265–1267	Roger de Leybourne and Henry of Bourne
1268–1270	Stephen of Penchester of Allington Castle near Maidstone and Henry of Leese.
1271–1272	Henry Malmains of Pluckley, (died in office)
1272–1273	William of Hever of Hever Castle
1273	William Haute of Petham (remainder of year only)
1274–1277	William of Valoynes of Swerdlin and Repton
1277	Henry Perot of Knowlton (remainder of year only)
1278–1281	Robert of Scothon
1282–1284	Peter of Huntingfield of Iseling.
1285	Hamo of Gatton of Throwley
1286–1288	William of Chellesfield of Chelsfield
1289–1290	William of Bramshot
1291	John of Northwood in Milton near Sittingbourne
1292	John of Northwood and John of Bourne
1293–1295	John of Bourne
1296–1297	William Trussell
1298	Henry of Apuldorefield
1299	John of Northwood in Milton near Sittingbourne
1300–1301	Henry of Cobham of Rundal in Shorn
1302–1303	Warreis of Valloynes
1304–1305	John of Northwood in Milton near Sittingbourne
1306	William of Cossenton in Aylesford
1307	Henry of Cobham
1308–1312	John of Blunde
1313–1314	William of Basing & John the younger of Haudlo
1315	Henry of Cobham
1316	John Malemaines of Hoo
1317	John Malemaines of Hoo and John Fremingham
1318	John Fremingham and Henry Sarden
1319	Henry Sarden and William Septvans
1320	
1321–1322	William Septvans of Milton and Ralph Savage
1323	John Shelvige of Shelvige Barne
1324–1325	John of Fremingham
1326	Ralph of St. Laurence of Swaycliffe
1327	William of Orlanston
1328	William of Orlanston replaced by John of Shelvige
1329–1330	Roger de Raynham replaced by John of Bourne
1331–1332	Thomas of Brockhall and Laurence of St. Laurence
1333–1335	Stephen of Cobham
1336	Thomas of Brockhall of Saltwood
1337–1338	William Morant of Morant's Court in Chevenning
1339	Henry of Valoynes of Repton in Ashford
1340	John de Mereworth of Mereworth
1341	John de Mereworth of Mereworth and John Widleston
1342–1345	John Widleston
1346	William of Langley of Knowlton
1347	John of Fremingham
1348	William Langley and Arnold Savage of Bobbing
1349	William Langley of Knowlton
1350	William Langley of Knowlton
1351	James Le Pine of East Sutton
1352	William Apuldorefield of Linsted
1353	James le Pine of East Sutton
1354	Reginald de Dyke, of the Dykes family of Sussex.
1355	Gilbert of Hels of Egerton
1356	William of Apuldorefield of Linsted
1357	Ralph Fremingham of Fremingham
1358	William Makenade of Preston
1359–1361	William of Apuldorefield of Linsted
1362	William Pimpe of Nettlested
1363	William of Apuldorefield of Linsted
1364–1366	Jeffrey Culpeper of Preston Hall, Aylesford.
1367	Richard at Leese of Shelwich
1368	John of Brockall of Saltwood
1369	John Culpeper of Bayhill, Pembury.
1370	William of Apuldorefeild of Linsted
1371	William Pimpe of Nettlested
1372	John Barry of Sevington
1373	Jeffrey Culpeper of Preston Hall, Aylesford.
1374	Robert Nottingham of Milsted
1375	William Pimpe of Nettlested
1376	Nicholas at Crouch of Great Chart
1377	Henry of Apuldorefeild of Linsted
1378	Sir Thomas Cobham of Randall in Shorne and Allington Castle
1379	John of Freningham of Farningham, Loose and West Barming
1380	James of Peckham of Wrotham
1381	William Septuans of Milton Septuans
1382	Arnold Savage of Bobbing
1383–1384	Thomas Brockhill of Saltwood
1385	Robert Corbie of Boughton
1386	Arnold Savage of Bobbing
1387	Ralph St Leger of Ulcomb
1388	William of Guildford
1389	James Peckham of Wrotham
1390	William Burcester of Hunton
1391	Richard Berham of Berham
1392	Thomas Chich of the Dungeon near Canterbury alias Thomas Chicche, of Balnerley or Balverley
1393	William Barry of Sevington
1394	John of Freningham of Farningham, Loose and West Barming
1395	Sir Thomas Culpeper of Bayhill, Pembury.
1396	Sir Nicholas Haute of Wadden Hall in Waltham
1397	Thomas St. Leger of Ulcomb
1398	Nicholas Potyn of Sheppey
1399	John Boteller of Graveney

== 15th century to 16th century ==
Dates	Name
1400	Robert Clifford of Canterbury
1401	Thomas Ludlow
1402	John Digges
1403	Thomas Chicche of Beverley, Canterbury, possibly the son of Thomas Chicche, former Sheriff, qv
1404–1405	Richard Clitheroe of Ash-next-Sandwich
1406	Valentine Barret of Pery Court
1407	Henry Horne of Kenardington
1408	Edward or Edmund Haute
1409	William Snayth of Addington (died 1409)
1410	Reynold Pympe of Nettlestead
1411	John Darell of Calehill
1412	William Notebenn of Ash near Sandwich
1413	William Clifford of Bobbing
1414	Robert Clifford of Canterbury
1415	William Langley of Knowlton
1416	William Darell of Calehill
1417	John Darell of Calehill
1418	Richard Clitherow of Ash
1419	John Burge of Eatonbridge
1420–1421	William Haute of Bourne Place, Hautsbourne, Bishopsbourne.
1422	John Darell of Calehill
1423	William Cheyne of Shurland in Sheppey
1424	John Rickhill of Frindsbury
1425	William Clifford of Bobbing
1426	Sir William Culpeper of Scotshall in Oxen Hoath.
1427	Thomas Ellis of Kennington
1428	William Scott of Brabourne
1429	John Peche of Littington
1430	John St Leger of Ulcombe
1431	Edward Guildford of Halden in Rolvenden
1432	William Buriston of Hunton
1433	Richard Woodvile of Mote Castle in Maidstone
1434	William Clifford of Bobbin
1435	William Manston of Manston in Thanet
1436	James Fiennes, 1st Baron Saye and Sele, of Kemsing and Seal
1437	Richard Waller of Groombridge in Speldherst
1438	Edward Guildford of Halden in Rolvenden
1439	Sir Gervase Clifton of Bradbourne
1440	John Yeard of Denton near Eleham
1441	John Warner of Sheppey
1442	William Maries of Preston
1443	Sir Thomas Browne of Beechworth
1444	William Cromer of Tunstall (killed by Jack Cade)
1445	John Thorneberry of Feversham
1446	William Isley of Sundridge
1447	William Kene of Ospring
1448	Stephen St. Leger of Ulcomb
1449	Henry Cromer of Tunstall.
1450	Sir Gervase Clifton of Bradbourne
1451	Robert Horne of Kinardington
1452	Thomas Ballard of Horton
1453	John Fogge of Repton in Ashford
1454	John Cheyne of Shurland in Sheppey, Kt,
1455	Philip Belknap of the Mote
1456	Alexander Iden (capturer of Jack Cade)
1457	John Guildford of Halden in Rolvenden
1458	Sir Gervase Clifton of Canterbury, Kt.
1459	Sir Thomas Browne of Beechworth
1460	Sir John Scott of Scot's Hall
1460	John Isaac of Patricksborne
1461–1462	Sir William Peach of Lullingstone, Kt.
1463	John Digges of Barham
1464	Alexander Clifford of Bobbing
1465	Sir William Haute of Bourne Place, Bishopsbourne. (first term)
1466	Sir John Culpeper, Kt.
1467	Ralph I St. Leger (d.1470) of Ulcombe
1468	Henry Ferrers of Peckham
1469	John Bramstone of Preston
1470	Sir Richard Culpeper of Oxonhoath, West Peckham.
1471	James Peckham of Yaldham in Wrotham
1472	Sir John Fogge of Repton in Ashford., Kt
1473	John Isley of Sundridge
1474	Sir William Haute of Bourne Place, Bishopsbourne. (second term)
1475	John Green of Chesilhurst
1476	William Cheney of Shurland
1477	Richard Haute of Ightham Mote
1478	Richard Lee of Delce
1479	Sir John Fogge of Repton in Ashford, Kt.
1480	George Brown of Wickham
1481–1482	Richard Haute of Ightham Mote
1483	Sir William Haute of Bourne Place, Bishopsbourne
1484	John Barrune of the Grange in Gillingham
1485	Sir R. Brakenberry of the Mote (killed Bosworth, 1485)
1485	William Cheney of Shurland in Sheppey
1486	John Pimpe of Nettlested
1487	Henry Ferrers of Great Peckham
1488	Walter Roberts of Glastenbury in Cranbrook
1489	Sir William Boleyn of Hever Castle
1490	Sir William Scott of Brabourne
1491	John Darell
1492	Thomas Kempe of Olantigh in Wye
1493	Sir Richard Guildford of Halden in Rolvenden, Kt.
1494	John Pech of Lullingstone
1495	John Digges of Barham
1496	Sir James Walsingham of Scadbury Manor, near Chislehurst
1497	Lewes Clifford of Bobbing
1498	Robert Wotton of Boughton Place, Boughton Malherbe.
1499	Sir Alexander Colepepper of Bedgbury.
1500	Thomas Iden of Westwell.
1501	Sir William Scott of Brabourne
1502	Ralph St Leger of Ulcombe.
1503	William Cromer of Tunstall
1504	John Langley of Knolton.
1505	Sir Thomas Kempe KB of Ollantigh.
1506	Sir Alexander Colepepper of Bedgbury
1507	Henry Vane of Tunbridge.
1508	Reginald Peckham of Yaldham
1509	Sir William Cromer of Tunstall
1510	James Digges of Digges Court, Barham.
1511	Sir Thomas Boleyn of Hever Castle (later Earl of Wiltshire in 1529).
1512	Thomas Kempe of Olantigh in Wye
1513	Sir John Norton of Northwood in Milton, Kt.
1514	Alexander Colepeper of Bedbury in Goudherst
1515	Thomas Cheney of Shurland, Isle of Sheppey
1516	Sir William Scott of Brabourne
1517	Sir Thomas Boleyn of Hever Castle (later Earl of Wiltshire in 1529).
1518	John Crispe of Quex in Birchington
1519	Sir John Wilshire of Stone castle in Stone near Dartford
1520	John Roper of St. Dunstans
1521	Throwley replaced by Robert Sonds of Towne
1522	Sir John Fogg of Repton in Ashford
1523	Sir George Guildford of Hemsted in Benenden
1524	Sir William Haute of Bourne Place, Bishopsbourne
1525	Henry Vane
1526	William Whetenhall of Peckham
1527	Sir John Scott of Scot's Hall, Smeeth
1528	William Kempe of Olantigh in Wye
1529	Sir Edward Wotton of Boughton Place, Boughton Malherbe
1530	William Waller of Groombridge in Speldherst
1531	Sir Richard Clement of Ightham Mote
1532	Sir William Finch of the Mote near Canterbury, Kt.
1533	Thomas Roberts of Glastenbury in Cranbrook
1534	Sir Thomas Poynings of Ostenhanger, in Stanford
1535	Sir Edward Wotton of Boughton Place, Boughton Malherbe
1536	Sir Thomas Wyatt of Alington Castle, Kt
1537	Sir William Haute of Bourne Place, Bishopsbourne
1538	Sir William Sidney of Pensherst. Kt
1539	Sir Anthony St. Leger of Ulcombe.
1540	Anthony Sonds of Throwley
1541	Sir Reginald Scott of Scot's Hall
1542	Sir Henry Isley of Sundridge, Kt.
1543	Sir Humphrey Stile of Langley Parke in Beckenham, Kt.
1544	Sir John Fogg of Repton in Ashford, Kt.
1545	Sir Percivall Hart of Lullingstone, Kt.
1546	Henry Crispe of Quex in Birchington
1547	William Sedley, of Scadbury in Southfleet
1548	Sir George Harper of Sutton Valence
1549	Thomas Culpeper of Bedgbury
1550	Sir Thomas Wyatt of Allington Castle
1551	Sir Henry Isley of Sundridge.
1552	Sir John Guildford of Hemsted
1553	Sir Robert Southwell of Mereworth
1554	William Roper of Welhall
1555	Sir Thomas Kempe of Olantigh in Wye
1556	Sir Thomas Moyle
1557	George Vane of Badsell in Capel
1558	Thomas Wotton of Boughton Place, Boughton Malherbe
1559	Nicholas Crispe of Whitstable
1560	Warham St Leger of Ulcombe
1561	John Tufton
1562	Richard Baker of Sissinghurst Castle.
1563	Sir Thomas Walsingham of Scadbury Manor, near Chislehurst
1564	Sir Thomas Kempe, Kt. of Olantigh in Wye
1565	John Mainey (died May, 1566)
1566	William Isley of Sundridge
1566	John Sedley of Southfleet
1567	Willam Cromer of Tunstall, near Sittingbourne
1568	John Browne of Horton
1569	Edward Isaac
1570	John Leonard of Chevening
1571	Walter Mainey the elder, of Stapleherst
1572	Thomas Fane
1573	Thomas Willoughby of Boreplace in Chidingstone
1574	Sir James Hales, Kt., of the Dungeon near Canterbury
1575	John Tufton of Hothfield
1576	Sir Thomas Scott of Scot's Hall
1577	Edward Boys of Fredvile in Nonington
1578	Thomas Wotton of Boughton Place, Boughton Malherbe
1579	Thomas Coppinger
1580	Thomas Fane of Burston and Thomas Sonds of Throwley
1581	Sir George Heart of Lullingstone
1582	Sir Richard Baker of Sissinghurst Castle
1583	Justinian Champneyes of Bexley
1584	Michael Sondes of Throwley
1585	Willam Cromer of Tunstall
1586	James Hales of the Dungeon near Canterbury
1587	John Fineux of Herne
1588	Richard Hardres of Great Hardres
1589	William Sedley of Southfleet
1590	Thomas Willoughby of Boreplace in Chidingstone
1591	Sampson Lennard of Chepening
1592	Robert Binge of Wrotham
1593	Michael Sondes of Throwley
1594	Sir Edward Wotton of Boughton Place, Boughton Malherbe, (Baron Wotton from 1603)
1595	Thomas Palmer of Hougham
1596	Sir Moyle Finch of Eastwell (later Baronet Finch)
1597	Thomas Kemp of Olantigh in Wye
1598	Martin Barnham, of Holingborne
1599	Roger Twysden of Roydon Hall, East Peckham

== 17th century to 18th century ==
Dates	Name
1600	John Smith of Westenhanger Castle, near Hythe
1601	Thomas Scott of Scot's Hall in Smeeth
1602	Peter Manwood of St. Stevens
1603	James Cromer of Tunstall.
1604	Sir Thomas Baker of Sissinghurst Castle.
1605	Sir Moyle Finch of Eastwell, Kt. (later Baronet Finch)
1606	Sir Norton Knatchbull of Mersham Hatch, Kt.
1607	Robert Edolph of Hinxhill
1608	Sir Edward Hales of Woodchurch
1608	Nicholas Miller of Oxonhoath, West Peckham.
1609	Sir William Withens of Eltham, Kt
1610	Sir Nicholas Gilborne of Charing, Kt.
1611	Sir Maxmilian Dallison of Halling, Kt
1612	Sir William Stede of Harietsham, Kt.
1613	Sir Anthony Aucher of Bishopsbourne, Kt.
1614	Sir Edward Filmer of East Sutton Place.
1615	Sir Edwin Sandys of Norburne, Kt.
1616	William Beswick, of Horsmanden
1617	Gabriel Livesey of Hollingborne
1618	Thomas Norton of Bobbing
1619	Edward Scott of Scot's Hall in Smeeth
1620	Sir John Sedley Bt of The Friars, Aylesford
1621	Thomas Roberts of Glastenbury in Cranbrook
1622	Sir George Fane of Burston in Hunton, Kt.
1623	Sir John Hayward of Hollingbourne, Kt
1624	Sir Thomas Hamond of Brasted, Kt
1625	Sir Isaak Sedley Bt of Great Chart.
1626	Sir Basil Dixwell Bt of Broome House near Canterbury.
1627	Sir Edward Engeham of Canterbury, Kt
1628	Sir William Campion of Combwell in Goudherst, Kt
1629	Richard Brown
1630	Sir Robert Lewknor Kt of Acris.
1631	Nicholas Miller of Wrotham
1632	Sir Thomas Style Bt of Wateringbury
1633	Sir John Baker Bt of Sissinghurst Castle
1634	Edward Chute, of Hinxhill
1635	Sir William Culpeper Bt of Preston Hall, Aylesford.
1636	Sir George Sondes of Throwley, KB
1637	Sir Thomas Hendley of Coureshorn in Cranbrook, Kt
1638	Sir Edward Master of Canterbury. Kt
1639	David Polhill of Otford
1640	James Hugeson of Kinsted
1641–1643	Sir William Brockman initially appointed but replaced by Sir John Honiwood of Elmsted, Kt.
1644	Sir John Rayney Bt of Wrotham Place, Wrotham
1645	Sir Edward Monins Bt of Waldershare, West Peckham
1646	John Henden of Biddenden
1647	Sir Stephen Scott
1648	George Selby of Ightham Mote
1649	Henry Crispe of Quex, Birchington, deputised to son Sir Nicholas Crispe
1650	George Curteis, of Chart next Sutton Valence
1651	Thomas Fludd of Otham
1652	Bernard Hide
1653	John Earle of Thanet, of Hothfield
1654	Sir Humphrey Tufton, Bt. of the Mote in Maidstone
1655–1657	Sir Michael Livesey, Bt. of East-Church in the Isle of Sheppey
1658	Charles Bowles of Chetham
1660	Thomas Plummer
1661	Sir Robert Austen, 1st Baronet of Hall Place, Bexley
1662	David Polhill of Chipsted
1663	Nicholas Toke of Goddington, in Great Chart
1664	Thomas Biggs
1665	Sir John Beale Bt of Farningham Court, near Maidstone.
1666	Sir Humphrey Miller, 1st Baronet, of Oxenhoath
1667	Sir William Leech of Squerryes
1668	Sir John Williams, Baronet, of Elham Court, Elham
1669	Robert Jaques
1670	Sir John Dorrel
1671	Sir William Hugessen, of Provender, in Norton
1672	John Twisleton, of Horsman's Place, in Dartford
1673	Edward Roper replaced by April 1673 by Sir Bernard Hyde, of Sundridge
1674	William Gomeldon, of Somerfield Court, in Sellindge
1675	Francis Vanacker
1676	Sir John Cutler, 1st Baronet, of Deptford
1677	John Grove, of Tunstall replaced 22 November 1676 by Thomas Cadwell
1678	Sir Richard Betenson, 1st Baronet of Scadbury Manor, near Chislehurst replaced 17 November 1677 by William Allen, of Marden
1679	Sir Richard Betenson, 1st Baronet, of Scadbury Manor, near Chislehurst
1680	Ralph Petley, of Hartley Wood Corner replaced late 1680 by George Etkins of Gravesend
1681	Sir Henry Palmer, of Wingham
1684	Archibald Clinkard of Sutton Valence
1685–1688	William Rooke of Canterbury (later Sir William Rooke)
1689	Sir Robert Filmer Bt of East Sutton Place
1690	Thomas Adrian of Bifrons, in Patriksbourn
1691	Sir Henry Palmer, Bt of Wingham
1692	Sir John Marsham of the Mote, Maidstone (died 1692)
1693	Sir Nicholas Toke of Goddington, in Great Chart
1694	Edmund Davenport of Greensted-Green, in Darent
1695	William Cage of Milgate, Bearsted
1696	Solomon Hougham of Sandwich
1697	Richard Goodhugh of Tonbridge
1698	George Children of Tunbridge
1699	John Amherst, esq. of East Farleigh
1700	William Woodgate
1701	Isaac Loader of Deptford
1702	Bowyer Hendley of Gore-court, in Otham
1703	Thomas Golding of Leyborne
1704	Sir Thomas Culpeper Bt of Preston Hall, Aylesford.
1705	Sir Edward Betenson, Bt of Scadbury Manor, near Chislehurst.
1706	Snelling Thomas of Deptford
1707	Percival Hart of Lullingstone
1708	James Codd of Goudhurst (died in office) replaced by Stephen Stringer of Goudhurst
1709	Sir Comport Fytche Bt of Mount Markfall, Eltham.
1710	Sir Thomas Style, 4th Baronet of Wateringbury
1711	Humphrey Style of Langley, in Beckenham
1712	John Hooker of Little Peckham
1713	Leonard Bartholomew of Oxonhoath, West Peckham
1714	John Lynch of Grove, in Staple
1715	David Polhill of Chipstead
1716	Richard Gee of Orpington
1717	Richard Sheldon of Aldington, in Thurnham
1718	John Stevens
1719	John Hamilton, Jnr
1720	Sir Charles Farnaby of Kippington, in Sevenoke
1721	Jonathan Smith of Ingres, in Swanscombe
1722	Peter Burrell of Beckenham
1723	William Glanville of St. Cleres, in Ightham
1724	Sir Robert Austen, 4th Baronet of Hall Place, Bexley.
1725	James Master of Yotes, in Mereworth
1726	John Savage (died and replaced May 1726 by Richard Lewen)
1727	Samuel Pugh, of Beckenham
1728	Robert Weller of Tunbridge
1729	Thomas May of Godmersham Park, near Canterbury
1730	Mawdistly Best of Park House, Boxley
1731	James Brookes of Lewisham
1732	William James, of Igtham
1733	Sir Brook Bridges Bt of Goodneston Park near Sandwich, who died in office and was followed by Sir Wyndham Knatchbull Bt of Mersham Hatch.
1734	Henry Hicks of Deptford
1735	Baldwin Duppa, junior of Hollingbourn
1736	Abraham Spencer of Penhurst
1737	Thomas Malyn of Chislehurst
1738	Jones Raymond of Langley in Beckenham, replaced by Christopher Milles of Nackington
1739	Robert Lacey of Elmes, in Hougham.
1740	John Smith of Lee
1741	John Lidgbird of Plumstead
1742	John Mason of East Greenwich
1743	Thomas Whitaker of Trottiscliffe
1744	John Hodsdon of Lewisham
1745	John Cooke of Cranbrook
1746	Arthur Harris of Barming
1747	William Quilter of Orpington
1748	Samuel Collett of Greenwich
1749	Richard Hornsby of Horton Kirby
1750	Richard Merry of Eltham
1751	James Best of Park House, Boxley
1752	Sir John Honywood, Bt of Elmsted
1753	Sir John Shaw Bt of Eltham Lodge, Eltham.
1754	Sir Thomas Rider, Kt., of Boughton Monchelsea Place
1755	George Sayer of Charing
1756	John Cockaine Sole, of Bobbing,
1757	William Glanville Evelyn, of St. Clere
1758	Thomas Whittaker of Trottiscliff,
1759	Pyke Buffar of Greenwich
1760	Sir Thomas Wilson of West Wickham
1761	William Jumper of Leeds Abbey, Leeds, Kent.
1762	Sir George Kelly of Speldhurst, who was knighted during his shrievalty.
1763	William Gordon of Rochester.
1764	Henry Goodwin of Deptford.
1765	Sir Richard Betenson, Bt. of Bradbourn, in Sevenoke.
1766	William Wilson of Plaistow
1767	James Whatman, of Boxley
1768	Richard Hulse, of Baldwin's, near Dartford, (second son of sir Edward Hulse).
1769	William Wheatley, of Erith.
1770	John Toke, of Goddington, in Great Chart.
1771	William Daniel Master, of Yotes Court, in Mereworth.
1772	James Flint, of Judde-house, in Ospringe.
1773	Josiah Fuller Farrer, of Cleve-court, in Thanet.
1774	Willshire Emmett,. of Wiarton, in Boughton Monchelsea.
1775	Granville Wheeler, of Otterden-place.
1776	William Perrin, esq. of Smith's-hall, in West Farleigh.
1777	Benjamin Harenc, of Footscray-place.
1778	John Ward, of Westerham.
1779	William Slade, of Lewisham.
1780	Robert Burrow, of Holwood-hill.
1781	John Cator, of Beckenham-place.
1782	Samuel Boys, of Hawkhurst.
1783	Henry Hawley, of the Grange, in Leyborne. since created a baronet.
1784	Charles Booth, of Harrietsham-place, who was knighted during his shrievalty.
1785	Edward Knatchbull esq. of Provenders, in Norton, (eldest son of Sir Edward Knatchbull, 7th baronet).
1786	Thomas Hallet Hodges, of Hemsted Park, in Benenden.
1787	John Cottin, of Hill-park, in Westerham.
1788	James Bond, of Hayes.
1789	John Cartier, of Bedgbury, in Goudhurst
1790	Leonard Bartholomew, of Addington-place.
1791	William James Drake Brockman, of Beachborough, in Newington, near Hythe.
1792	Henry Streatfield, of Highstreet-house, in Chiddingstone.
1793	George Norman, of The Rookery, Bromley Common.
1794	Richard Carew, of Orpington.
1795	Gabriel Harpur, of Gore-court, in Tunstall; Samuel Chambers of that parish was appointed his deputy, and executed this office for him.
1796	John Mumford, of Sutton at Hone.
1797	George Grote of Beckenham
1798	John Plumtree of Fredville
1799	Samuel Chambers of Woodstock House

== 19th century ==
- 5 February 1800: John Larking, of East Malling
- 12 February 1801: Edward Austen, of Godmersham
- 3 February 1802: Thomas Godfrey, of Ash
- 3 February 1803: Christopher Cooke, of Ash Grove
- 1 February 1804: Sir Walter Stirling, 1st Baronet, of Shoreham
- 6 February 1805: John Minet Fector, of Updown
- 1 February 1806: John Harrison, of Dennehill
- 4 February 1807: John Simpson of Fairlawn, Sevenoaks
- 3 February 1808: Charles Milner, of Preston Park
- 6 February 1809: Sir Brook William Bridges, 4th Baronet, of Goodneston
- 31 January 1810: James Burton, of Mabledon
- 8 February 1811: Sir John Courtenay Honywood, 5th Baronet, of Evington
- 24 January 1812: John Wells, of Bickley Park
- 10 February 1813: John Cator, of Beckenham
- 4 February 1814: James Wildman, of Chilham Castle
- 13 February 1815: Robert Foote, of Charlton
- 1816: Alexander Evelyn of St Clere
- 1817: William Alexander Morland of Lamberhurst
- 1818: William Henry Baldock of Petham
- 1819: Hon. John Wingfield Stratford of Addington Place
- 1820: Sir Thomas Dyke, 4th Baronet of Lullingstone
- 1821: Sir John Shelley-Sydney, 1st Bt of Penshurst.
- 1822: John Powell Powell of Quex
- 1823: Thomas Austen of Sevenoaks.
- 1824: Fiennes Wykeham-Martin of Leeds Castle
- 1825: William George Daniel-Tyssen, of Foley House
- 1826: Sir John Fagge, 7th Baronet of Mystole, Chartham
- 1827: Isaac Minet, of Baldwyns
- 1828: Sir Thomas Maryon Wilson, 8th Baronet of Charlton
- 1829: Thomas Rider of Boughton Monchelsea Place, near Maidstone
- 1830: Edward Rice, of Dane Court
- 1831: Baden Powell, of Speldhurst
- 1832: George Douglas, of Chilston Park
- 1833: Demetrius Grevis James, of Ightham
- 1834: George Stone, of Chislehurst
- 1835: John Ward, of Holwood
- 1836: Sir Edward Cholmeley Dering, 8th Baronet, of Surrenden
- 1837: Francis Bradley, of Gore Court
- 1838: Thomas Turner Alkin, of Hunton Court
- 1839: David Salomons, of Broom Hill, Tunbridge Wells
- 1840: Arthur Pott, of Bentham Hill
- 1841: Delamark Banks, of Sheppey Court
- 1842: Henry Hoare, of Staplehurst
- 1843: Frederick Perkins, of Chipsted Place
- 1844: Sir Joseph Hawley, 3rd Baronet, of Leybourne Grange
- 1845: Sir Moses Montefiore, of East Cliff, Saint Lawrence
- 1846: William Osmund Hammond, of Saint Alban's
- 1847: John Pelly Atkins, of Halsted
- 1848: John Ashley Warre, of Westcliffe, Saint Lawrence
- 1849: William Masters Smith, of Camer, Meopham
- 1850: Matthew Bell, of Bourne House, Bishopsbourne
- 1851: Ford Wilson, of Blackhurst, Tonbridge Wells
- 1852: Sir John William Lubbock of High Elms Down, Bt.
- 1853: Francis Colville Hyde of Syndale House, Ospringe
- 1854: Alexander Glendining, of Ashgrove, Sevenoaks
- 1855: Sir Walter Charles James, 2nd Baronet, of Betteshanger, near Sandwich
- 1856: Richard Paterson, of Leesons, Chislehurst
- 1857: John Savage, of St Leonards
- 1858: Edward Ladd Betts, of Preston Hall, Aylesford
- 1859: Sir Richard Tufton, 1st Baronet, of Hothfield Place, near Maidstone
- 1860: Sir Courtenay Honywood, 7th Baronet, of Evington, Elmstead, near Canterbury
- 1861: Alexander Randall, of Foley House, Maidstone
- 1862: Henry Bannerman, of Hunton Court, near Maidstone
- 1863: Samuel Long, of Bromley Hill
- 1864: George Field, of Ashurst Park, near Tunbridge Wells
- 1865: Robert Rodger, of Hadlow Castle, near Tonbridge
- 1866: Thomas Farmer Baily, of Hall Place, Leigh
- 1867: William Moore, of Wierton
- 1868: Stephen Musgrave Hilton, of Bramling House, Ickham
- 1869: Joseph Ridgway, of Fairlawn, Shipbourne
- 1870: Sir Edmund Filmer, 9th Baronet of East Sutton Park
- 1871: Francis Philips, of Lee Priory, Ickham
- 1872: Sir John Frederick Croft, 2nd Bt, of Doddington Place.
- 1873: John Wingfield Stratford, of Addington Park, Maidstone
- 1874: Charles Stewart Hardy, of Chilham Castle, Canterbury
- 1875: George Duppa, of Hollingbourne House, Maidstone
- 1876: Edward Loyd, of Lillesden, Hawkhurst
- 1877: Charles John Plumptre, of Fredville, Wingham
- 1878: Edward Henry Scott, of Sundridge Park, Bromley
- 1879: Lieutenant-Colonel Thomas Walton Roberts, of Glassenbury House, Cranbrook.
- 1880: Sir David Lionel Goldsmid-Stern-Salomons, 2nd Baronet of Brooms Hill, Southborough, Tunbridge Wells
- 1881: Mawdistly Gaussen Best, of Park House, Boxley
- 1882: Lieutenant-Colonel Henry Dorrien Streatfeild, of Chiddingstone, Edenbridge.
- 1883:William Hale Willats, of Denton Court, Canterbury,
- 1884: George Samuel Fereday-Smith, of Grovehurst, Tunbridge Wells,
- 1885: William Alexander Mackinnon, of Acrise Place, Folkestone,
- 1886: Chapman de Laune Faunce-Delaune, of Sharsted Court, Sittingbourne,
- 1887: Lieutenant-Colonel Charles Arthur Madan Warde, of Squerryes Court, Westerham.
- 1888: William James Thompson, of Kippington, Sevenoaks,
- 1889: Joseph Sebag-Montefiore, of East Cliff Lodge, Ramsgate,
- 1890: Henry Arthur Brassey, of Preston Hall, Aylesford,
- 1891: Charles Wheler Wheler, of Otterden Place, Faversham
- 1892: Multon Lambarde, of Beechmont, Sevenoaks
- 1893: Richard Benyon Berens, of Kevington, St. Mary Cray, Dartford
- 1894: Richard James Balston of Springfield House, Maidstone
- 1895: Thomas Bevan, of Stone Park, Stone, near Dartford
- 1896: The Hon. Ralph Pelham Nevill, of The Manor, Birling, near Maidstone.
- 1897: Richard Coombe Miller, of Oakfield, Dartford
- 1898: Norman Watney, of Valence, Westerham
- 1899: James Taddy Friend, of Northdown, Margate

== 20th century ==
- 1900: William Marshall Cazalet, of Fairlawn, Shipbourne, Tonbridge
- 1901: Henry Booth Hohler, of Fawkham Manor, Longfield
- 1902: Edward Locke Tomlin, of Angley Park, Cranbrook
- 1903: Sir Charles Jessel, Bt of Ladham House, Goudhurst
- 1904: John Francis William Deacon of Mabledon, Tunbridge,
- 1905: Colonel William Fearon Tipping, of Brasted Place, Brasted.
- 1906: Thomas Colyer Colyer-Fergusson, of Ightham Mote, Sevenoaks,
- 1907: Edward Windsor Hussey, of Scotney Castle, Lamberhurst,
- 1908: Archibald Cameron Norman, of The Rookery, Bromley Common, Bromley
- 1909: Colonel Charles Stanley Williams, of Ivy House, Bough Beech, Chiddingstone.
- 1910: Robert Norton, of Downs House, Yalding
- 1911: George Ashley Dodd, of Godinton, Ashford
- 1912: Osmond Elim d'Avigdor Goldsmid, of Somerhill, Tonbridge
- 1913: Sir Mark Edlmann Collet of St. Clere, Kemsing, Sevenoaks, Bt.
- 1914: Francis Elmer Speed of Knowlton Court, Dover
- 1915: Algernon Massy Fleet of Darenth Grange, near Dartford
- 1916: Cuthbert Arthur Morris Morris-Field, of Ashurst Park, Tunbridge Welle
- 1917: Frederick William Hollams of Dene Park, Tonbridge
- 1918: Lieut.-Colonel John Middleton Rogers, of Riverhill, Sevenoaks
- 1919: Henry Augustus Milles-Lade, of Nash Court, Boughton, Faversham.
- 1920: Captain William Lee Henry Roberts, of Holborough Court, Snodland,
- 1921: Capt. Vivian Trestrail Dampier Palmer, of Heronden Hall, Tenterden
- 1922: John Wheeler Wheeler-Bennett, of Ravensbourne, Keston
- 1923: John Wheeler Wheeler-Bennett, of Ravensbourne, Keston
- 1924: Robert Henry Style, of Boxley House, Boxley
- 1925: Sir John Dewrance, of Cranmor Place, Walden Koad, Chislehurst
- 1926: Charles Eugene Gunther, of Tongswood, Hawkhurst, Kent
- 1927: Frank Cyril Tiarks of Foxbury, Chislehurst
- 1928: William Plender, 1st Baron Plender of Ovenden House, Sundridge, Sevenoaks
- 1929: Copley De Lisle Hewitt, of The Friars, Aylesford
- 1930: Sir Edmund Davis, Kt of Chilham Castle, near Canterbury
- 1931: Major Sir John Theodore Prestige, of Bourne Park, Bishopsbourne, near Canterbury
- 1932: Raoul Hector Foa, of Holywell Park, near Wrotham, Sevenoaks
- 1933: Alfred Charles Leney, of The Garden House, Saltwood, Hythe
- 1934: Arthur Charles Davis, of Stone Castle, near Greenhithe
- 1935: Walter Kennedy Whigham, of Highland Court, Bridge, Canterbury
- 1936: Lieut Col Arthur Laurence Cecil Neame, of Syndale, near Faversham
- 1937: Edward William Meyerstein, Morants Court, Chevening, Sevenoaks
- 1938: Major Max Teichman-Derville, of The Red House, Littlestone
- 1939: Col. Francis Joseph Frederick Edlmann, of Hawkwood, Chislehurst
- 1940: Sir Louis Newton, 1st Baronet, of Rostrevor, Wickham Road, Beckenham, Bt
- 1941: Sir Edward William Meyerstein (1864–1942). References: The Seaxe, No 38, 2001t: Edward William Meyerstein.
- 1942: Leslie Doubleday, of Hempstead House, Tonge, near Sittingbourne
- 1943: Benjamin Andrew Glanvill, of The Hill, Bromley
- 1944: Claud Francis Goddard, of Holywell Park, Ash-next-Ridley, Wrotham
- 1945: Lieut.-Colonel Sir Albert Stern, of Barham Court, Teston, near Maidstone
- 1946: William Colthup, of Hopebourne, Harbledown, near Canterbury
- 1947: Walter Kennedy Whigham, of Highland Court, Bridge, near Canterbury
- 1948: Thomas Neame, of Preston Lea, Faversham.
- 1949: Francis Walter Chamberlain, of The Glebe House, West Wickham
- 1950: Major-General Charles Wake Norman, of Street House, Hayes.
- 1951: Leslie Doubleday, of Hempstead House, Tonge, near Sittingbourne.
- 1952: Willie Emerson Dedrick, of Brome House, West Mailing
- 1953: Major Sir Henry d'Avigdor-Goldsmid, 2nd Baronet, of Somerhill House, Tonbridge
- 1954: Major John Roberts O'Brien Warde, of Squerryes Court, Westerham.
- 1955: Jasper Beale Neame, of Cratloe, Faversham
- 1956: Sir (Hugh) Garrard Tyrwhitt-Drake, of Cobtree Manor, Maidstone
- 1957: Brigadier Hugh Ronald Norman, of St. Clere, Kemsing
- 1958: Sir George Jessel, Baronet, of Ladham House, Goudhurst
- 1959: Admiral Sir Henry Ruthven Moore, of The Beck, Wateringbury
- 1960: Peter Victor Ferdinand Cazalet, of Fairlawne, Tonbridge.
- 1961: Commander Sir John James Kenward Best-Shaw, of Boxley Abbey, Maidstone
- 1962: Walter Henry Whigham, of Cobham Court, Bekesbourne, near Canterbury.
- 1963: Christopher Edward Clive Hussey, of Scotney Castle, Lamberhurst
- 1964: Sir Cuthbert Lowell Ackroyd, Bt., of Finches, Bromley
- 1965: Walter Charles Withecomb Brice of Highover, Hoo, near Rochester.
- 1966: Lieut.-Colonel William Owen Hamborough Joynson, of Tebbs Corner, Ightham, near Sevenoaks.
- 1967: Cecil Stuart Chiesman of Longways, Denbridge Road, Bickley.
- 1968: Gerald Wellington Williams, of Crockham House, Westerham
- 1969: William Hope Loudon of Olantigh, Wye, near Ashford.
- 1970: Major William Michael Robson of Hales Place, Tenterden
- 1971: Colonel Sir Derek Burdick Greenaway, Bt., of Dunmore, Four Elms, Edenbridge.
- 1972: Anthony James Hannam Taylor, of Long Barn, Callis Court Road, Broadstairs
- 1973: Kenneth McAlpine of The Priory, Lamberhurst
- 1974: David George Wilfrid Barham, of Hole Park, Rolvenden
- 1975: John Gore Phillimore of The Postern, Tonbridge
- 1976: Lieutenant Colonel Garth Leslie Doubleday, of Rodmersham House, Rodmersham, Sittingboume
- 1977: Anthony George Pige Leschallas, of Hocker Edge House, Cranbrook.
- 1978: Major Ion Calvocoressi of Court Lodge, Westerham.
- 1979: John Keith Shipton of The Manor House, Upper Hardres, Canterbury
- 1980: Edward St John Brice of Hoo Lodge, Hoo, Rochester
- 1981: Marianna, Viscountess Monckton of Brenchley, of Runhams Farm, Harrietsham, Maidstone
- 1982: Robert Victor John Evans of Squerryes Lodge, Westerham
- 1983: Brigadier Maurice Alan Atherton, of Digges Place, Barham, Canterbury
- 1984: Richard James Corben of Great Ivy Mill, Loose, Maidstone
- 1985: Major Sir Marc Noble of Deerleap House, Knockholt, Sevenoaks
- 1986: Theda Fitzgerald Moore of George House, Bridge Street, Wye, Ashford.
- 1987: Captain Richard Dewar Neame, of The Court House, Bishopbourne, Canterbury.
- 1988: Lieutenant Colonel John Rochfort Yerburgh, of Hartlip Place
- 1989: Henry Cornwallis Maude, of Wingham Well House, Wingham
- 1990: John St Andrew Warde, of Squerryes Court, Westerham
- 1991: David McArthur Holman, of Crundale House, Crundale, Canterbury
- 1992: Henry Hyde Villiers of Ulcombe Place, Ulcombe, Maidstone
- 1993: Robin Charles Denison-Pender
- 1994: Rosemary Chloe Teacher, of Hadlow Place, Tonbridge
- 1995: Robin John Baker White of Street End Place, Street End, Canterbury.
- 1996: Paul James Cranston Smallwood of The Old Rectory, Stanford, Ashford.
- 1997: Edwin Roy Pratt Boorman of Redhill Farm, Redhill, Wateringbury.
- 1998: John Philip Merricks of The Manor, Icklesham, Rye, East Sussex
- 1999: John Bernard Sunley, of The Old Vicarage, Godmersham, near Canterbury

== 21st century ==
- 2000: Roderick Francis Loder-Symonds of Denne Hill Farm, Womenswold, Canterbury.
- 2001: Robert Harry Beale Neame, of Dane Court, Kits Hill, Selling, Faversham.
- 2002: Charles Lancelot Dawes of Leacon Hall, Warehorne, Ashford.
- 2003: Anthony Hugh Verner Monteuuis, of Park Holt, Penshurst, Tonbridge
- 2004: James Rushworth Hope Loudon, of Olantigh, Wye, Ashford
- 2005: William Arthur Andrew Wells of Mere House, Mereworth
- 2006: Amanda Arianwen Cecilia Cottrell of Challock Lees, Ashford
- 2007: Nigel Leonard Wheeler, of East Peckham, Tonbridge
- 2008: Richard John Oldfield, of Doddington Park
- 2009: Jane Margaret Rogers, of Riverhill House, Sevenoaks
- 2010: Peregrine Tatton Eyre Massey, of Boldshaves, Woodchurch
- 2011: Georgie Mary Warner, of Petteridge Place, Brenchley
- 2012: Michael William Sommerville Bax of Shadoxhurst, Ashford
- 2013: Alastair Campbell, 4th Baron Colgrain of Sevenoaks
- 2014: Hugo Mark Fenwick of Egerton, Ashford
- 2015: William Alexander, of Shoreham, Sevenoaks
- 2016: Kathrin Fiona Smallwood of Charing
- 2017: George Elphinstone Jessel of East Brabourne, near Ashford
- 2018: Susan Jane Ashton of Tenterden
- 2019: Paul Jonathan Barrett of Wickhambreaux, Canterbury
- 2020: Remony Elizabeth St John Millwater of Sandwich
- 2021: John Charles Harold Weir of Hempstead, Gillingham
- 2022: Russell John Race of Rochester
- 2023: Nadra Ahmed, of West Malling
- 2024: Dr Gillian Fargher, Rochester
- 2025: Jonathan Beale Neame, Faversham
- 2026: Martin Lukehurst, Sittingbourne
