= Sir Thomas Hendley =

English landholder and Sheriff of Kent

High Sheriff of Kent

Personal details
- Born: 20 April 1580 Ticehurst, Sussex, England
- Died: 28 January 1656 (aged 75)
- Spouse: Elizabeth Wilford (1578–1634)

Sir Thomas Hendley (1580–1656) was an English landholder who served as Sheriff of Kent.

== Life ==
He was the son of Thomas Hendley (1554–1590), Lord of the Manor of Coursehorn at Cranbrook, Kent, and his first wife Anne, daughter of Henry Bowyer and his wife Elizabeth Vaux. He married Elizabeth, daughter of John Wilford (1547–1605) and his wife Elizabeth Cordall, the ceremony being on 28 February 1597 at the church of St Botolph-without-Bishopsgate in the City of London.

In 1637 he served as Sheriff of Kent. In addition to his inherited manor of Coursehorn, he acquired two other manors in the parish of Cranbrook, those of Angley and Bettenham.

== Family ==
Thomas and Elizabeth had thirteen children, including Sir Walter Hendley, 1st Baronet and John Hendley (1617–1676), who became the father of Bowyer Hendley.
