= William Sedley =

English landowner and administrator

William Sedley (c. 1509-1553) was an English landowner and administrator from Kent who lived at Scadbury in the parish of Southfleet and served as Sheriff of the county in 1547.
