= Parliamentary constituencies in Bedfordshire =

The county of Bedfordshire in relation to England

The ceremonial county of Bedfordshire (which comprises Bedford, Central Bedfordshire and Luton unitary authorities) is split into 7 seats – 2 borough and 5 county constituencies. (Note: Hitchin is a cross-county boundary constituency, mostly covering areas of northern Hertfordshire but also containing electoral wards in Central Bedfordshire.)

== Constituencies ==
† Conservative † ‡ Labour ‡

Name (Note: BC denotes borough constituency, CC denotes county constituency.)	Electorate	Majority (Note: The majority is the number of votes the winning candidate receives more than their nearest rival.)	Member of Parliament	Nearest opposition	Electoral wards	Map
Bedford BC	70,068	9,430	Mohammad Yasin ‡	Pinder Chauhan †	Bedford Borough Council: Brickhill, Castle, Cauldwell, De Parys, Goldington, Harpur, Kempston Central and East, Kempston North, Kempston South, Kempston West, Kingsbrook, Newnham, Putnoe, Queen's Park.	A small constituency, located north of the centre of the county.
Dunstable and Leighton Buzzard CC	74,069	667	Alex Mayer ‡	Andrew Selous †	Central Bedfordshire Council: Dunstable Central, Dunstable-Icknield, Dunstable-Manshead, Dunstable-Northfields, Dunstable-Watling, Heath and Reach, Houghton Hall, Leighton Buzzard North, Leighton Buzzard South, Linslade, Parkside, Tithe Farm.	A medium-sized county located in the west of the county.
Hitchin CC (Note: Hitchin is a cross-county boundary constituency, mostly covering areas of northern Hertfordshire but also containing electoral wards in Central Bedfordshire.)	72,112	7,109	Alistair Strathern ‡	Bim Afolami †	Central Bedfordshire Council: Arlesey, Shefford, Stotfold and Langford. North Hertfordshire District Council: Cadwell, Chesfield, Hitchin Bearton, Hitchin Highbury, Hitchin Oughton, Hitchin Priory, Hitchin Walsworth, Hitchwood, Offa and Hoo, Kimpton.	A large constituency covering central and southern areas of the county; also extends to northern areas of neighbouring Hertfordshire.
Luton North BC	73,266	7,510	Sarah Owen ‡	Jilleane Brown †	Luton Borough Council: Barnfield, Bramingham, Challney, Ickfield, Leagrave, Lewsey, Limbury, Northwell, Saints, Stopsley, Sundon Park.	A small constituency, located in the southwest of the county and entirely surrounded by other county constituencies.
Luton South and South Bedfordshire CC	70,197	6,858	Rachel Hopkins ‡	Mark Versallion †	Central Bedfordshire Council: Caddington, Eaton Bay. Luton Borough Council: Biscot, Crawley, Dallow, Farley, High Town, Round Green, South, Wigmore.	A medium-sized constituency, located in the south-west of the county.
Mid Bedfordshire CC	71,748	1,321	Blake Stephenson †	Maahwish Mirza ‡	Bedford Borough Council: Elstow and Stewartby, Wilshamstead, Wootton. Central Bedfordshire Council: Ampthill, Aspley and Woburn, Barton-le-Clay, Cranfield and Marston Moretaine, Flitwick, Houghton Conquest and Haynes, Silsoe and Shillington, Toddington, Westoning, Flitton and Greenfield.	A large constituency located in the north-west of the county.
North Bedfordshire CC	76,319	5,414	Richard Fuller †	Uday Nagaraju ‡	Bedford Borough Council: Bromham and Biddenham, Clapham, Eastcotts, Great Barford, Harrold, Kempston Rural, Oakley, Riseley, Sharnbrook, Wyboston. Central Bedfordshire Council: Biggleswade North, Biggleswade South, Northill, Potton, Sandy.	A large constituency in the north and north-east of the county.

== Boundary changes ==
=== 2024 ===
For the 2023 Periodic Review of Westminster constituencies, which redrew the constituency map ahead of the 2024 United Kingdom general election, the Boundary Commission for England opted to combine Bedfordshire with Hertfordshire as a sub-region of the East of England region, with the creation of the cross-county boundary constituency of Hitchin. As a result of the changes, Luton South was renamed Luton South and South Bedfordshire, North East Bedfordshire renamed North Bedfordshire, and South West Bedfordshire renamed Dunstable and Leighton Buzzard.

Former name
1. Bedford BC
2. Luton North BC
3. Luton South BC
4. Mid Bedfordshire CC
5. North East Bedfordshire CC
6. South West Bedfordshire CC
Boundaries 2010-2024

2010-2024 constituencies in Bedfordshire

Current name
1. Bedford BC
2. Dunstable and Leighton Buzzard CC
3. Hitchin CC
4. Luton North BC
5. Luton South and South Bedfordshire CC
6. Mid Bedfordshire CC
7. North Bedfordshire CC
Boundaries 2024–present

Current constituencies in Bedfordshire

=== 2010 ===
Under the Fifth Periodic Review of Westminster constituencies, the Boundary Commission for England decided to retain Bedfordshire's constituencies for the 2010 election, making minor changes to realign constituency boundaries with the boundaries of current local government wards, and to reduce the electoral disparity between constituencies.

Name
1. Bedford BC
2. Luton North BC
3. Luton South BC
4. Mid Bedfordshire CC
5. North East Bedfordshire CC
6. South West Bedfordshire CC
Boundaries 1997-2010

Parliamentary constituencies in Bedfordshire 1997 – 2005

Boundaries 2010–present

Parliamentary constituencies in Bedfordshire 2010–present

== Results history ==
Primary data source: House of Commons research briefing – General election results from 1918 to 2019

=== 2024 ===
The number of votes cast for each political party who fielded candidates in constituencies comprising Bedfordshire in the 2024 general election were as follows: (Note: It should be acknowledged that as Hitchin is a cross-county constituency between Bedfordshire and Hertfordshire, and the results of UK elections on sub-constituency levels are not disclosed, the following vote shares include parts of the Hitchin constituency located in Hertfordshire)

Party	Votes	%	Change from 2019	Seats	Change from 2019
Labour	114,813	36.8%	▲2.6%	5	▲2
Conservative	88,794	28.0%	▼21.8%	2	▼1
Reform UK	45,831	14.4%	▲13.2%	0	0
Liberal Democrats	29,346	9.2%	▲0.2%	0	0
Greens	17,092	5.4%	▲2.5%	0	0
Others	13,447	4.2%	▲1.2%	0	0
Workers Party of Britain	8,020	2.5%	New	0	New
Total	317,343	100.0		7	

=== 2019 ===
The number of votes cast for each political party who fielded candidates in constituencies comprising Bedfordshire in the 2019 general election were as follows:

Party	Votes	%	Change from 2017	Seats	Change from 2017
Conservative	156,973	49.8%	▼0.5%	3	0
Labour	107,591	34.2%	▼7.8%	3	0
Liberal Democrats	28,276	9.0%	▲4.4%	0	0
Greens	9,126	2.9%	▲1.0%	0	0
Brexit	3,712	1.2%	new	0	0
Others	9,318	3.0%	▲1.7%	0	0
Total	314,996	100.0		6	

=== Percentage votes ===
Election year	1950	1951	1955	1959	1964	1966	1970	1974 (Feb)	1974 (Oct)	1979	1983	1987	1992	1997	2001	2005	2010	2015	2017	2019	2024
Labour	42.4	45.3	44.7	38.8	43.9	45.6	40.9	34.0	37.3	32.9	22.6	24.2	30.3	44.0	42.8	34.2	27.1	29.5	42.0	34.2	36.2
Conservative^{1}	44.5	49.7	53.5	49.9	47.8	43.8	50.5	39.7	40.4	51.3	51.0	54.2	53.2	38.6	39.4	40.6	44.7	47.2	50.3	49.8	28.0
Reform UK^{2}	–	–	–	–	–	–	–	–	–	–	–	–	–	–	–	–	–	–	–	1.2	14.4
Liberal Democrat^{3}	13.0	4.9	1.8	11.2	8.0	10.3	8.4	26.2	22.2	14.8	26.3	21.1	14.8	12.8	14.8	20.3	20.3	5.6	4.6	9.0	9.2
Green Party	–	–	–	–	–	–	–	–	–	–	–	*	*	*	*	*	0.7	3.6	1.9	2.9	5.4
UKIP	–	–	–	–	–	–	–	–	–	–	–	–	–	*	*	*	3.8	13.5	0.8	*	*
Workers Party of Britain	–	–	–	–	–	–	–	–	–	–	–	–	–	–	–	–	–	–	–	-	2.5
Other	0.1	–	–	–	0.3	0.3	0.2	0.1	0.1	1.0	0.1	0.4	1.7	4.6	3.1	4.9	3.5	0.6	0.4	2.9	4.2

^{1} Includes National Liberal Party up to 1966

^{2} 2019: as the Brexit Party –

^{3} 1950-1979 - Liberal ; 1983 & 1987 – SDP-Liberal Alliance

* Included in Other

=== Seats ===
Election year	1950	1951	1955	1959	1964	1966	1970	1974 (Feb)	1974 (Oct)	1979	1983	1987	1992	1997	2001	2005	2010	2015	2017	2019	2024
Conservative^{1}	3	4	4	4	3	1	4	3	3	5	5	5	5	3	3	3	4	4	3	3	2
Labour	1	0	0	0	1	3	0	2	2	0	0	0	0	3	3	3	2	2	3	3	5
Total	4	4	4	4	4	4	4	5	5	5	5	5	5	6	6	6	6	6	6	6	7

^{1}Includes National Liberal Party up to 1966

=== Maps ===
==== 1885-1910 ====
1885

1886

1892

1895

1900

1906

Jan 1910

Dec 1910

==== 1918-1945 ====
1918

1922

1923

1924

1929

1931

1935

1945

==== 1950-1979 ====
1950

1951

1955

1959

1964

1966

1970

Feb 1974

Oct 1974

1979

==== 1983-present ====
1983

1987

1992

1997

2001

2005

2010

2015

2017

2019

2024

== Timeline ==
Former constituency Current constituency

Constituency	1295–1885	1885–1918	1918–1950	1950–1974	1974–1983	1983–1997	1997–2024	2024–present
Bedfordshire	1295–1885							
Bedford	1295–1983						1997–present	
North Bedfordshire						1983–1997		2024–present
North East Bedfordshire							1997–2024	
Biggleswade		1885–1918						
Mid Bedfordshire			1918–present					
South Bedfordshire				1950–1983				
South West Bedfordshire						1983–2024		
Dunstable and Leighton Buzzard								2024-present
Luton		1885–1974						
Luton East					1974–1983			
Luton West					1974–1983			
Luton North						1983–present		
Luton South						1983–2024		
Luton South and South Bedfordshire								2024–present

== Historical representation by party ==
A cell marked → (with a different colour background to the preceding cell) indicates that the previous MP continued to sit under a new party name.

=== 1802 to 1837 ===
Conservative Tory Whig

Constituency	1802	1806	1807	1812	15	1818	1820	1826	1830	1831	1832	34	1835
Bedford	Antonie			G. Russell					Polhill		Crawley		
Bedford	S. Whitbread				Waldegrave	W. Whitbread							Polhill
Bedfordshire	Osborn		FitzPatrick	F. Russell							C. Russell		
Bedfordshire	St John	Pym				Osborn	Pym	Macqueen	Stuart	Payne	Stuart	→	Egerton

=== 1837 to 1885 ===
Conservative Liberal Whig

Constituency	1837	38	1841	47	1847	51	1852	54	1857	1859	1865	1868	72	1874	75	1880
Bedford	Stuart	Crawley	H. Stuart					W. Stuart	Barnard	W. Stuart		Howard		Polhill-Turner		Magniac
Bedford	Polhill				Verney		Whitbread			→						
Bedfordshire	C. Russell		Astell	C. Russell	F. Russell					→			Bassett		G. Russell	
Bedfordshire	Egerton					Gilpin										Howard

=== 1885 to 1918 ===
Conservative Liberal Liberal Unionist

Constituency	1885	1886	1892	92	1895	1900	1906	Jan 1910	Dec 1910	11
Bedford	Whitbread				Pym		Barlow	Attenborough	Kellaway	
Biggleswade	Magniac	Baring	Russell		Compton		Black			
Luton	Flower			Whitbread	Ashton					Harmsworth

=== 1918 to 1974 ===
Coalition Liberal (1918–22) / National Liberal (1922–23) Conservative Labour Liberal National Liberal (1931–68)

Constituency	1918	1922	1923	1924	1929	31	1931	1935	1945	1950	1951	1955	1959	60	63	1964	1966	1970
Bedford	Kellaway	Wells							Skeffington-Lodge	Soames							Parkyn	Skeet
Bedfordshire Mid	Townley	Linfield		Warner	Gray		Lennox-Boyd							Hastings				
Bedfordshire South										Moeran	Cole					→	Roberts	Madel
Luton	Harmsworth	Hewett	Howard	O'Connor	Burgin	→			Warbey	Hill					Howie			Simeons

=== 1974 to 1997 ===
Conservative Labour

Constituency	Feb 1974	Oct 1974	1979	1983	1987	1992
Bedford / North Bedfordshire (1983)	Skeet					
Bedfordshire Mid	Hastings			Lyell		
Bedfordshire South / South West Bedfordshire (1983)	Madel					
Luton East / Luton South (1983)	Clemitson		Bright			
Luton West / Luton North (1983)	Sedgemore		Carlisle			

=== 1997 to present ===
Change UK Conservative Independent The Independents Labour

Constituency	1997	2001	2005	2010	2015	2017	17	19		2019	23	2024
Bedford	Hall			Fuller		Yasin						
Bedfordshire Mid	Sayeed		Dorries								Strathern	Stephenson
North East Bedfordshire / N Bedfordshire (2024)	Lyell	Burt								Fuller		
SW Bedfordshire / Dunstable & Leighton Buzzard (2024)	Madel	Selous										Mayer
Luton South / Luton S & S Bedfordshire (2024)	Moran			Shuker				→	→	R. Hopkins		
Luton North	K. Hopkins						→			Owen		

== See also ==
- List of parliamentary constituencies in the East of England (region)
- History of parliamentary constituencies and boundaries in Bedfordshire
