= Gerard Braybrooke =

Gerard Braybrooke may refer to:

- Sir Gerard de Braybooke of Castle Ashby, MP for Northampton
- Gerard Braybrooke I (c. 1332–1403), MP for Bedfordshire
- Gerard Braybrooke II (bef.1354–1429), MP for Bedfordshire and Essex
