= Francis Bassett (MP) =

Francis Bassett MP

Member of Parliament for Bedfordshire
- In office 27 June 1872 – 28 April 1875 Serving with Richard Gilpin
- Preceded by: Richard Gilpin; Francis Russell
- Succeeded by: George Russell; Richard Gilpin

Personal details
- Born: 25 May 1820
- Died: 9 June 1899 (aged 79)
- Party: Liberal

Francis Bassett (25 May 1820 – 9 June 1899) was a British Liberal politician.

His father John Dollin Bassett was partner in a bank at Leighton Buzzard, of which Francis and his brother also became partners. He was elected MP for Bedfordshire at a by-election in 1872 but resigned in 1875.

Parliament of the United Kingdom
Preceded by Richard Gilpin; Francis Russell	Member of Parliament for Bedfordshire; 1872 – 1875; With: Richard Gilpin	Succeeded by George Russell; Richard Gilpin
