= Reynold Braybrooke =

English politician

Sir Reynold Braybrooke (c. 1356 - 20 September 1405) was an English politician.

== Life ==
Braybrooke was the son of Gerard Braybrooke I and brother of Gerard Braybrooke II. His wife was Joan, daughter of John de la Pole.

== Career ==
In January 1404, Braybrooke was MP for Kent.

== Death ==
Braybrooke died of a battle wound on 20 September 1405. His wife remarried several times; both their sons had predeceased him.
