= List of electoral wards in Bedfordshire =

This is a list of electoral divisions and wards in the ceremonial county of Bedfordshire in South East England. All changes since the re-organisation of local government following the passing of the Local Government Act 1972 are shown. The number of councillors elected for each electoral division or ward is shown in brackets.

== Unitary authority councils ==
=== Bedford ===
Wards from 1 April 1974 (first election 7 June 1973) to 5 May 1983:

1. No. 1 (Cauldwell) (4)
2. No. 2 (De Parys) (6)
3. No. 3 (Goldington) (6)
4. No. 4 (Harpur) (5)
5. No. 5 (Kingsbrook) (4)
6. No. 6 (Newnham) (4)
7. No. 7 (Queens Park) (3)
8. No. 8 (Bromham) (2)
9. No. 10 (Oakley) (1)
10. No. 11 (Carlton & Harrold) (1)
11. No. 12 (Felmersham & Sharnbrook) (1)
12. No. 13 (Knotting & Souldrop) (1)
13. No. 14 (Swineshead) (1)
14. No. 15 (Riseley) (1)
15. No. 17 (Roxton) (1)
16. No. 21 (Kempston Rural) (1)
17. No. 22 (Wootton) (1)
18. No. 23 (Turvey) (1)
19. No. 24 (Kempston) (6)
20. Clapham (2)
21. Eastcotts (1)
22. Great Barford (1)
23. Renhold (1)
24. Wilshamstead (1)

Wards from 5 May 1983 to 2 May 2002:

Wards from 2 May 2002 to 5 May 2011:

1. Brickhill (3); changed to (2) in 2009
2. Bromham (3); changed to (2) in 2009
3. Carlton (1)
4. Castle (3); changed to (2) in 2009
5. Cauldwell (3); changed to (2) in 2009
6. Clapham (2); changed to (1) in 2009
7. De Parys (2); changed to (1) in 2009
8. Eastcotts (1)
9. Goldington (3); changed to (2) in 2009
10. Great Barford (2); changed to (1) in 2009
11. Harpur (3); changed to (2) in 2009
12. Harrold (1)
13. Kempston East (2); changed to (1) in 2009
14. Kempston North (2); changed to (1) in 2009
15. Kempston South (3); changed to (2) in 2009
16. Kingsbrook (3); changed to (2) in 2009
17. Newnham (2); changed to (1) in 2009
18. Oakley (1)
19. Putnoe (3); changed to (2) in 2009
20. Queen’s Park (2); changed to (1) in 2009
21. Riseley (1)
22. Roxton (1)
23. Sharnbrook (1)
24. Turvey (1)
25. Wilshamstead (2); changed to (1) in 2009
26. Wootton (3); changed to (2) in 2009

Wards from 5 May 2011 to 4 May 2023:

1. Brickhill (2)
2. Bromham & Biddenham (2)
3. Castle (2)
4. Cauldwell (2)
5. Clapham (1)
6. De Parys (2)
7. Eastcotts (1)
8. Elstow (1); renamed Elstow & Stewartby in 2013
9. Goldington (2)
10. Great Barford (2)
11. Harpur (2)
12. Harrold (1)
13. Kempston Central & East (2)
14. Kempston North (1)
15. Kempston Rural (1)
16. Kempston South (1)
17. Kempston West (1)
18. Kingsbrook (2)
19. Newnham (2)
20. Oakley (1)
21. Putnoe (2)
22. Queens Park (2)
23. Riseley (1)
24. Sharnbrook (1)
25. Wilshamstead (1)
26. Wootton (1)
27. Wyboston (1)

Wards from 4 May 2023:

1. Biddenham (1)
2. Brickhill (2)
3. Bromham (2)
4. Castle & Newnham (2)
5. Cauldwell (3)
6. Clapham & Oakley (2)
7. De Parys (2)
8. Goldington (2)
9. Great Barford (1)
10. Great Denham (1)
11. Greyfriars (1)
12. Harpur (2)
13. Harrold (1)
14. Kempston Central & East (2)
15. Kempston North (1)
16. Kempston South (1)
17. Kempston West (1)
18. Kingsbrook (2)
19. Putnoe (2)
20. Queens Park (3)
21. Renhold & Ravensden (1)
22. Riseley (1)
23. Riverfield (1)
24. Sharnbrook (1)
25. Shortstown (2)
26. Wixams & Wilstead (3)
27. Wootton & Kempston Rural (2)
28. Wyboston (1)

=== Central Bedfordshire ===
Wards from 1 April 2009 (first election 4 June 2009) to 5 May 2011:

1. Ampthill (2)
2. Barton (2)
3. Biggleswade (4)
4. Cranfield (2)
5. Dunstable Downs (4)
6. Flitwick East (2)
7. Flitwick West (2)
8. Grovebury (2)
9. Houghton Regis (4)
10. Icknield (2)
11. Langford & Henlow Village (2)
12. Leighton Linslade Central (4)
13. Marston (2)
14. Maulden & Houghton Conquest (2)
15. Northfields (2)
16. Northill & Blunham (2)
17. Plantation (2)
18. Potton (2)
19. Sandy (2)
20. Shefford (2)
21. Silsoe & Shillington (2)
22. Southcott (2)
23. South East Bedfordshire (2)
24. South West Bedfordshire (2)
25. Stotfold & Arlesey (4)
26. Toddington (2)
27. Watling (2)
28. Woburn & Harlington (2)

Wards from 5 May 2011 to 4 May 2023:

1. Ampthill (3)
2. Arlesey (3)
3. Aspley & Woburn (1)
4. Barton-le-Clay (1)
5. Biggleswade North (2)
6. Biggleswade South (2)
7. Caddington (2)
8. Cranfield & Marston Moretaine (3)
9. Dunstable – Central (1)
10. Dunstable – Icknield (2)
11. Dunstable – Manshead (1)
12. Dunstable – Northfields (2)
13. Dunstable – Watling (2)
14. Eaton Bray (1)
15. Flitwick (3)
16. Heath & Reach (1)
17. Houghton Conquest & Haynes (1)
18. Houghton Hall (2)
19. Leighton Buzzard North (3)
20. Leighton Buzzard South (3)
21. Linslade (3)
22. Northill (1)
23. Parkside (1)
24. Potton (2)
25. Sandy (3)
26. Shefford (2)
27. Silsoe & Shillington (1)
28. Stotfold & Langford (3)
29. Tithe Farm (1)
30. Toddington (2)
31. Westoning, Flitton & Greenfield (1)

Wards from 4 May 2023:

1. Ampthill (3)
2. Arlesey & Fairfield (2)
3. Aspley & Woburn (1)
4. Barton-le-Clay & Silsoe (2)
5. Biggleswade East (2)
6. Biggleswade West (3)
7. Caddington (2)
8. Clifton, Henlow & Langford (3)
9. Cranfield & Marston Moretaine (3)
10. Dunstable Central (1)
11. Dunstable East (2)
12. Dunstable North (2)
13. Dunstable South (1)
14. Dunstable West (2)
15. Eaton Bray (1)
16. Flitwick (3)
17. Heath & Reach (1)
18. Houghton Conquest & Haynes (1)
19. Houghton Regis East (3)
20. Houghton Regis West (2)
21. Leighton-Linslade North (3)
22. Leighton-Linslade South (3)
23. Leighton-Linslade West (3)
24. Meppershall & Shillington (1)
25. Northill (1)
26. Potton (2)
27. Sandy (3)
28. Shefford (2)
29. Stotfold (2)
30. Toddington (2)
31. Westoning, Flitton & Greenfield (1)

=== Luton ===
Wards from 1 April 1974 (first election 7 June 1973) to 6 May 1976:

1. Central (4)
2. Crawley (4)
3. Dallow (4)
4. High Town (4)
5. Icknield (4)
6. Leagrave (4)
7. Lewsey (4)
8. Limbury (4)
9. South (4)
10. Stopsley (4)
11. Sundon Park (4)
12. Wardown (4)

Wards from 6 May 1976 to 1 May 2003:

Wards from 1 May 2003 to 4 May 2023:

1. Barnfield (2)
2. Biscot (3)
3. Bramingham (2)
4. Challney (3)
5. Crawley (2)
6. Dallow (3)
7. Farley (3)
8. High Town (2)
9. Icknield (2)
10. Leagrave (3)
11. Lewsey (3)
12. Limbury (2)
13. Northwell (2)
14. Round Green (3)
15. Saints (3)
16. South (3)
17. Stopsley (2)
18. Sundon Park (2)
19. Wigmore (3)

Wards from 4 May 2023:

1. Barnfield (3)
2. Beech Hill (3)
3. Biscot (2)
4. Bramingham (3)
5. Central (2)
6. Challney (3)
7. Dallow (2)
8. Farley (3)
9. High Town (2)
10. Leagrave (2)
11. Lewsey (2)
12. Northwell (3)
13. Poets (2)
14. Round Green (2)
15. Saints (3)
16. South (2)
17. Stopsley (3)
18. Sundon Park (2)
19. Vauxhall (2)
20. Wigmore (2)

== Former county council ==
=== Bedfordshire ===
Electoral Divisions from 1 April 1974 (first election 12 April 1973) to 2 May 1985:

1. Ampthill (1)
2. Ampthill Rural No. 1 (1)
3. Ampthill Rural No. 2 (Cranfield) (1)
4. Ampthill Rural No. 3 (1)
5. Ampthill Rural No. 4 (1)
6. Ampthill Rural No. 5 (1)
7. Ampthill Rural No. 6 (1)
8. Bedford No. 1 (3)
9. Bedford No. 2 (1)
10. Bedford No. 3 (1)
11. Bedford No. 4 (1)
12. Bedford No. 5 (1)
13. Bedford No. 6 (1)
14. Bedford No. 7 (1)
15. Bedford No. 8 (1)
16. Bedford No. 9 (1)
17. Bedford No. 10 (1)
18. Bedford Rural No. 1 (Wilshamstead) (1)
19. Bedford Rural No. 2 (1)
20. Bedford Rural No. 3 (1)
21. Bedford Rural No. 4 (1)
22. Bedford Rural No. 5 (1)
23. Bedford Rural No. 6 (1)
24. Bedford Rural No. 7 (1)
25. Biggleswade (2)
26. Biggleswade Rural No. 1 (Arlesey) (1)
27. Biggleswade Rural No. 2 (Stotfold) (1)
28. Biggleswade Rural No. 3 (1)
29. Biggleswade Rural No. 4 (1)
30. Biggleswade Rural No. 5 (1)
31. Biggleswade Rural No. 6 (1)
32. Dunstable Central (2)
33. Dunstable North (2)
34. Dunstable South (2)
35. Kempston (2)
36. Leighton-Linslade No. 1 (2)
37. Leighton-Linslade No. 2 (2)
38. Luton (Central) (2)
39. Luton (Crawley) (3)
40. Luton (Dallow) (2)
41. Luton (High Town) (2)
42. Luton (Icknield) (2)
43. Luton (Leagrave) (3)
44. Luton (Lewsey) (3)
45. Luton (Limbury) (2)
46. Luton (South) (3)
47. Luton (Stopsley) (2)
48. Luton (Sundon Park) (3)
49. Luton (Wardown) (2)
50. Luton Rural No. 1 (Barton-le-Clay) (1)
51. Luton Rural No. 2 (Houghton Regis) (2)
52. Luton Rural No. 3 (2)
53. Luton Rural No. 4 (1)
54. Luton Rural No. 5 (1)
55. Sandy (1)

Electoral Divisions from 2 May 1985 to 5 May 2005:

1. Ampthill (1)
2. Arlesey & Langford (1)
3. Ashcroft (1); electoral division abolished in 1997
4. Aspley Guise (1)
5. Barnfield (1); electoral division abolished in 1997
6. Barton-le-Clay (1)
7. Beaudesert (1)
8. Beechwood (1); electoral division abolished in 1997
9. Biggleswade Ivel (1)
10. Biggleswade Stratton (1)
11. Biscot (1); electoral division abolished in 1997
12. Bramingham (1); electoral division abolished in 1997
13. Brickhill (1)
14. Bromham (1)
15. Brooklands (1)
16. Bury Park (1); electoral division abolished in 1997
17. Caddington (1)
18. Castle (1)
19. Cauldwell (1)
20. Challney (1); electoral division abolished in 1997
21. Clapham (1)
22. Cranfield & Marston (1)
23. Crawley (1); electoral division abolished in 1997
24. Dallow (1); electoral division abolished in 1997
25. De Parys (1)
26. Dunstable Central (1)
27. Dunstable Icknield (1)
28. Eaton Bray (1)
29. Farley (1); electoral division abolished in 1997
30. Flitwick (1)
31. Goldington (1)
32. Great Barford & Wilshamstead (1)
33. Harlington (1)
34. Harpur (1)
35. Harrold (1)
36. Hart Hill (1); electoral division abolished in 1997
37. High Town (1); electoral division abolished in 1997
38. Houghton Regis North West (1)
39. Houghton Regis South East (1)
40. Kempston East (1)
41. Kempston West (1)
42. Kinsgbrook (1)
43. Leagrave (1); electoral division abolished in 1997
44. Lewsey (1); electoral division abolished in 1997
45. Limbury (1); electoral division abolished in 1997
46. Linslade (1)
47. Luton Central (1); electoral division abolished in 1997
48. Luton Icknield (1); electoral division abolished in 1997
49. Luton South (1); electoral division abolished in 1997
50. Marsh Farm (1); electoral division abolished in 1997
51. Maulden (1)
52. Newnham (1)
53. North East Bedfordshire (1)
54. Northfields (1)
55. Northill (1)
56. Plantation (1)
57. Poets (1); electoral division abolished in 1997
58. Potton (1)
59. Priory (1)
60. Putnoe (1)
61. Queens Park (1)
62. Saints (1); electoral division abolished in 1997
63. Sandy (1)
64. Shefford & Clifton (1)
65. Shillington & Henlow (1)
66. Southcott (1)
67. Stopsley (1); electoral division abolished in 1997
68. Stotfold (1)
69. Sundon Park (1); electoral division abolished in 1997
70. Toddington (1)
71. Watling (1)
72. Wigmore (1); electoral division abolished in 1997
73. Wootton (1)

Electoral Divisions from 5 May 2005 to 1 April 2009 (county council abolished):

1. Ampthill (1)
2. Barton (1)
3. Biggleswade (2)
4. Brickhill (1)
5. Bromham (1)
6. Cauldwell (1)
7. Clapham & Oakley (1)
8. Cranfield (1)
9. De Parys (1)
10. Dunstable Downs (2)
11. Eastcotts (1)
12. Flitwick East (1)
13. Flitwick West (1)
14. Goldington (1)
15. Grovebury (1)
16. Harpur (1)
17. Harrold (1)
18. Houghton Regis (2)
19. Icknield (1)
20. Kempston (2)
21. Kempston Rural (1)
22. Kingsbrook (1)
23. Langford & Henlow Village (1)
24. Leighton Linslade Central (2)
25. Marston (1)
26. Maulden & Houghton Conquest (1)
27. Newnham (1)
28. North East Bedfordshire (1)
29. Northfields (1)
30. Northill & Blunham (1)
31. Plantation (1)
32. Potton (1)
33. Putnoe (1)
34. Queens Park (1)
35. Sandy (1)
36. Shefford (1)
37. Silsoe & Shillington (1)
38. South East Bedfordshire (1)
39. South West Bedfordshire (1)
40. Southcott (1)
41. Stotfold & Arlesey (2)
42. Toddington (1)
43. Watling (1)
44. Wilshamstead (1)
45. Woburn & Harlington (1)
46. Wootton (1)

== Former district councils ==
=== Mid Bedfordshire ===
Wards from 1 April 1974 (first election 7 June 1973) to 3 May 1979:

1. No. 2 (Biggleswade) (6)
2. No. 3 (Sandy) (3)
3. No. 10 (Flitton & Pulloxhill & Westoning) (2)
4. No. 11 (Flitwick & Steppingley) (3)
5. No. 13 (Aspley) (2)
6. No. 14 (Marston) (1)
7. No. 15 (Lidlington) (1)
8. No. 17 (Blunham) (1)
9. No. 18 (Northill) (1)
10. No. 20 (Campton & Meppershall & Shefford) (4)
11. No. 21 (Henlow & Langford) (3)
12. No. 24 (Potton) (2)
13. No. 25 (Wensley) (1)
14. Ampthill (3)
15. Arlesey (2)
16. Clophill (1)
17. Cranfield (2)
18. Harlington (1)
19. Haynes & Houghton Conquest (1)
20. Maulden (1)
21. Old Warden & Southill (1)
22. Shillington & Stondon (2)
23. Stotfold (3)
24. Woburn (1)
25. Wrest (1)

Wards from 3 May 1979 to 1 May 2003:

Wards from 1 May 2003 to 1 April 2009 (district abolished):

1. Ampthill (3)
2. Arlesey (2)
3. Aspley Guise (1)
4. Biggleswade Holme (2)
5. Biggleswade Ivel (3)
6. Biggleswade Stratton (2)
7. Clifton & Meppershall (2)
8. Cranfield (2)
9. Flitton, Greenfield & Pulloxhill (1)
10. Flitwick East (2)
11. Flitwick West (3)
12. Harlington (1)
13. Houghton, Haynes, Southill & Old Warden (2)
14. Langford & Henlow Village (2)
15. Marston (2)
16. Maulden & Clophill (2)
17. Northill & Blunham (2)
18. Potton & Wensley (3)
19. Sandy Ivel (2)
20. Sandy Pinnacle (3)
21. Shefford, Campton & Gravenhurst (3)
22. Shillington, Stondon & Henlow Camp (2)
23. Silsoe (1)
24. Stotfold (3)
25. Westoning & Tingrith (1)
26. Woburn (1)

=== South Bedfordshire ===
Wards from 1 April 1974 (first election 7 June 1973) to 6 May 1976:

1. No. 1 (Dunstable: Northfields) (2)
2. No. 2 (Dunstable: Icknield) (3)
3. No. 3 (Dunstable: Priory) (3)
4. No. 4 (Dunstable: Watling) (4)
5. No. 5 (Dunstable: Chiltern) (3)
6. No. 6 (Dunstable: Park) (1)
7. No. 7 (Leighton-Linslade: Ousel & Southcott) (4)
8. No. 8 (Leighton-Linslade: Grovebury & Brooklands) (3)
9. No. 9 (Leighton-Linslade: Beaudesert & Plantation) (3)
10. No. 11 (Hockcliffe & Stanbridge) (1)
11. No. 12 (Eaton Bray) (1)
12. No. 19 (Streatley) (1)
13. No. 20 (Toddington) (2)
14. No. 21 (Houghton Regis No. 1) (2)
15. No. 22 (Houghton Regis No. 2) (1)
16. No. 23 (Houghton Regis No. 3) (1)
17. No. 24 (Houghton Regis No. 4) (1)
18. Barton-le-Clay (2)
19. Caddington (2)
20. Heath & Reach (1)
21. Kensworth (1)
22. Slip End (1)
23. Studham (1)
24. Totternhoe (1)

Wards from 6 May 1976 to 2 May 2002:

Wards from 2 May 2002 to 1 April 2009 (district abolished):

1. All Saints (2)
2. Barton-le-Clay (2)
3. Caddington, Hyde & Slip End (3)
4. Chiltern (2)
5. Dunstable Central (2)
6. Eaton Bray (1)
7. Grovebury (3)
8. Heath & Reach (1)
9. Houghton Hall (3)
10. Icknield (3)
11. Kensworth & Totternhoe (2)
12. Linslade (2)
13. Manshead (2)
14. Northfields (3)
15. Parkside (2)
16. Planets (2)
17. Plantation (3)
18. Southcott (3)
19. Stanbridge (1)
20. Streatley (1)
21. Tithe Farm (2)
22. Toddington (2)
23. Watling (3)

== Electoral wards by constituency ==
Wards as they existed on 1 December 2020.

=== Bedford ===
Bedford: Brickhill; Castle; Cauldwell; De Parys; Goldington; Harpur; Kempston Central & East; Kempston North; Kempston South; Kempston West; Kingsbrook; Newnham; Putnoe; Queens Park.

=== Dunstable and Leighton Buzzard ===
Central Bedfordshire: Dunstable–Central; Dunstable–Icknield; Dunstable–Manshead; Dunstable–Northfields; Dunstable–Watling; Heath & Reach; Houghton Hall; Leighton Buzzard North; Leighton Buzzard South; Linslade; Parkside; Tithe Farm.

=== Hitchin (part) ===
Central Bedfordshire: Arlesey; Shefford; Stotfold & Langford.

=== Luton North ===
Luton: Barnfield, Bramingham, Challney, Icknield, Leagrave, Lewsey, Limbury, Northwell, Saints, Stopsley; Sundon Park.

=== Luton South and South Bedfordshire ===
Luton: Biscot; Crawley; Dallow; Farley; High Town; Round Green; South; Wigmore.

Central Bedfordshire: Caddington; Eaton Bray.

=== Mid Bedfordshire ===
Bedford: Elstow & Stewartby; Wilshamstead; Wootton.

Central Bedfordshire: Ampthill; Aspley & Woburn; Barton-le-Clay; Cranfield & Marston Moretaine; Flitwick; Houghton Conquest & Haynes; Silsoe & Shillington; Toddington; Westoning, Flitton & Greenfield.

=== North Bedfordshire ===
Bedford: Bromham & Biddenham; Clapham; Eastcotts; Great Barford; Harrold; Kempston Rural; Oakley; Riseley; Sharnbrook; Wyboston.

Central Bedfordshire: Biggleswade North; Biggleswade South; Northill; Potton; Sandy.

== See also ==
- List of parliamentary constituencies in Bedfordshire

== Sources ==
- opsi.gov.uk
