= Thomas Barnard (disambiguation) =

Thomas Barnard (c. 1726–1806) was an Irish Anglican bishop.

Thomas Barnard may also refer to:

- Thomas Barnard (MP) (1830–1909), Whig Member of Parliament for Bedford
- Tom Barnard (born 1951), American radio host

== See also ==
- Thomas Barnard Flint (1847–1919), Canadian lawyer and politician
