= Francis Pym (1756–1833) =

British politician (1756–1833)

Francis Pym (27 October 1756 – 4 December 1833) was a British politician and High Sheriff.

== Biography ==
Francis was the son of William Pym and Elizabeth née Kingsley and lived at the family seat of Hasells Hall (which he considerably improved) in Sandy, Bedfordshire.

He was a Whig Member of Parliament for Bedfordshire from 1806 to 1818, and from 1820 to 1826. He was also High Sheriff of Bedfordshire in 1791.

He married Anne Palmer in 1784; they had four sons: Francis, Revd William Wollaston, Robert and Charles and two daughters Anne and Catherine who all survived them, and two sons who did not, one having died in infancy and the other, John, a lieutenant in the 13th Light Dragoons, having been killed at the Battle of Waterloo.

He was the great-great-great-grandfather of Francis Leslie Pym.

He is buried in Sandy, Bedfordshire with a monument sculpted by Thomas Denman.

== Hasells Hall ==
Pym rebuilt the family's seat Hasells Hall (also known as Hazells Hall) located outside Sandy towards Everton. It is a Grade II listed manor house, with grounds designed by Humphry Repton.

Parliament of the United Kingdom
| Preceded by John Osborn; Hon. St Andrew St John | Member of Parliament for Bedfordshire; 1806–1818; With: John Osborn 1806–1807; Hon. Richard FitzPatrick 1807–1812; Marquess of Tavistock 1812–1818 | Succeeded by Sir John Osborn, 5th Bt; Marquess of Tavistock |
| Preceded by Marquess of Tavistock; Sir John Osborn, 5th Bt | Member of Parliament for Bedfordshire; 1820–1826; With: Marquess of Tavistock | Succeeded by Marquess of Tavistock; Thomas Potter Macqueen |
Honorary titles
| Preceded by James Metcalf | High Sheriff of Bedfordshire; 1791–1792 | Succeeded by Sir John Buchanan Riddell |
