= Anna Russell, Duchess of Bedford =

British noble

Her Grace The Duchess of Bedford
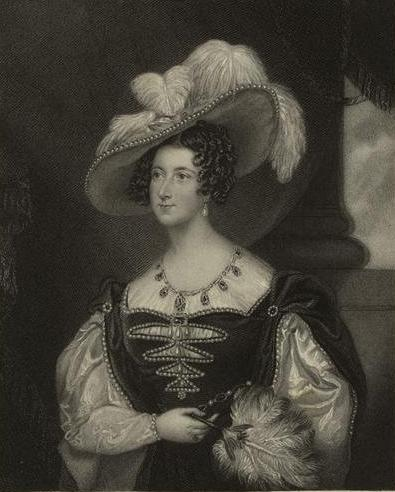
- Anna Russell, Duchess of Bedford
- Born: Anna Maria Stanhope; 3 September 1783; Portugal
- Died: 3 July 1857 (aged 73)
- Burial place: Bedford chapel, Chenies, Buckinghamshire
- Spouse: Francis Russell, 7th Duke of Bedford (m. 1808)
- Children: William Russell, 8th Duke of Bedford
- Parent(s): Charles Stanhope, 3rd Earl of Harrington; Jane Fleming

Anna Maria Russell, Duchess of Bedford (née Stanhope; 3 September 1783 – 3 July 1857) was a lifelong friend of Queen Victoria, whom she served as a Lady of the Bedchamber between 1837 and 1841.

Anna was the daughter of Charles Stanhope, 3rd Earl of Harrington, and Jane Fleming. She was the wife of Francis Russell, 7th Duke of Bedford (married in 1808), and sister-in-law to the prime minister John Russell. She was also the mother of William Russell, 8th Duke of Bedford. She became Duchess of Bedford in 1839, when her husband acceded to the dukedom.

According to the British Museum, the Duchess invented the custom of taking afternoon tea, in around 1840. Due to increasing urbanisation and industrialisation, wealthy English people were having their evening meal later and later, but still eating lunch at midday. The Duchess became despondent at the void between the two meals, and its consequent 'sinking feeling'. She therefore asked that some tea, bread and butter and cake be delivered to her room late in the afternoon, and "an afternoon ritual was born". However, this claim has been contested and cannot be verified.

The Duchess and her husband entertained the Queen at their country house Woburn Abbey in 1841. The Duchess was also the chief mourner at the funeral of Princess Augusta Sophia in 1840.

After inventing the afternoon tea ritual, the Duchess started inviting her friends to join in. As those friends were also royal courtiers, the Queen became aware of the nascent custom, and immediately approved. By the 1880s, the Queen had adopted the ritual herself, and was holding official tea receptions at her palaces.

== Death ==
The Duchess died in 1857 and is buried in the Bedford chapel at Chenies in Buckinghamshire.
