= Gerard Braybrooke I =

English politician

Sir Gerard Braybrooke I
- Constituency: Bedfordshire
- In office January 1377 – January 1377
- In office November 1390 – November 1390

Personal details
- Born: c. 1332
- Died: 1 February 1403
- Children: Gerard Braybrooke II, Reynold Braybrooke

Sir Gerard Braybrooke I (c. 1332 – 1 February 1403), of Colmworth, Bedfordshire and Horsenden, Buckinghamshire, was an English politician.

== Family ==
He was the father of MPs, Gerard Braybrooke II and Reynold Braybrooke.

== Career ==
Braybrooke was a member of parliament for Bedfordshire constituency in January 1377 and November 1390.
