= Peter Payne (MP) =

Peter Payne (1762–1843) was an English plantation owner in St Kitts, Whig pamphleteer and Member of Parliament for Bedfordshire from 1831 to 1832.

== Life ==
He was baptised on 17 March 1762, a younger illegitimate son of Sir Gillies Payne, 2nd Baronet and Maria Keeling. He was educated at Newcome's School, and was admitted to Queens' College, Cambridge in 1779. Later the same year he was admitted to the Inner Temple.

From the time in 1828 when Payne's title claim to his father's baronetcy was made the subject of an equity ruling in Glascott v. Bridges, his associates such Thomas Attwood called him Sir Peter. Significant in terms of the claim was the counter-claim made by Sir Thomas Neave, 2nd Baronet as representative of Sir Gillies Payne, some months later. The Lord Chancellor, John Copley, 1st Baron Lyndhurst, intervened to cancel the ruling in the chancery case in early 1829. He proposed that the legitimacy issue dividing Peter Payne and his elder brother John should be heard as a separate case. This never happened. Fisher writing for the History of Parliament concluded "the published authorities eventually deemed the title to have become extinct on the death of Sir Gillies Payne."

In the reform general election of 1831, Payne, although based in Northamptonshire, was chosen as a Whig candidate for Bedfordshire with the Francis Russell, Marquess of Tavistock. In the two-member constituency he came second in the poll, well ahead of the sitting Tory member William Stuart. In the general election of 1832, however, with Lord Charles Russell standing for the Russell interest, the position was reversed, with Stuart in second place ahead of Payne. Payne did not stand again.

== Works ==
- Seven short and plain Letters, to the inhabitants of Birmingham, on the leading points connected with the Orders in Council (1812), pseudonymous pamphlet as "Philagathos".

The anonymous 1810 pamphlet England the Cause of Europe's subjugation, Addressed to the British Parliament is attributed to Payne; the History of Parliament doubts whether it was published. There were notices in the Critical Review and Eclectic Review. It is mentioned in Biblioteca Parriana with tracts of William Roscoe; and was listed with political pamphlets of John Russell, 6th Duke of Bedford. There was a reply, also anonymous, the same year, England Vindicated; Or Observations on a Pamphlet Entitled "England the Cause of Europe's Subjugation" Addressed to the British Nation, published by R. Jabet.

== Family ==
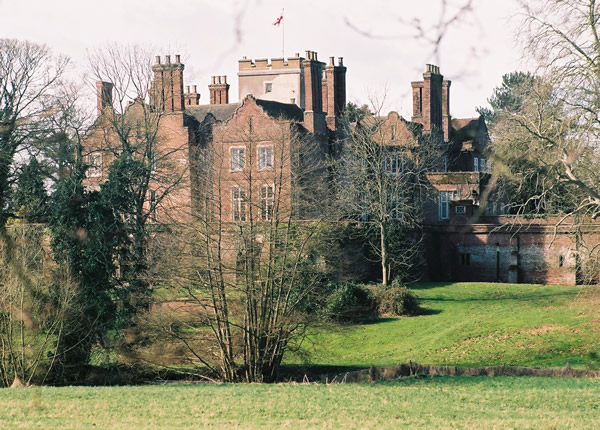
Stourton Castle, 2006 photograph

Payne married in 1789 Elizabeth Sarah Steward (died 1832), only daughter of Samuel Steward of Stourton Castle; the couple had three sons, one of whom predeceased his father, and four daughters. In the 18th century Stourton Castle had fallen into disrepair, and at one point was used as a farmhouse. It was then let to tenants. Samuel Steward was a barrister and magistrate. He was married to Mary Carver, daughter of Henry Carver of the Birmingham family in the brass trade.

As a marriage settlement, his father passed to Payne the Little Sir Gillies estate in St Kitts. In 1803 a survey reported negatively on this plantation dependent on enslaved labour, stating that it required investment, and the workers who had been badly treated were in a poor condition. The 1835 compensation claim for the estate mentioned 92 enslaved people. Peter Payne dropped his claim under the Slave Compensation Act 1837, and the compensation settlement went to his eldest son Charles Gillies Payne (1793–1870) of Blunham House, Bedfordshire.

- Robert Henley Payne (born 1795), second son, married in 1832 Louisa Chawner, daughter of the silversmith Henry Chawner and his wife Mary Hore, daughter of Edward Hore of Esher.
- Rev. Peter Samuel Henry Payne (died 1841), Dean of Balliol College. He had entered Balliol on an open scholarship.
- Maria Mary Payne (died 1848), eldest daughter, married in 1811 Joseph Webster III of Penns and was mother of Baron Dickinson Webster.
- Laura Janet Payne (died 1880 at age 85), second daughter.
- Elizabeth Payne (died 1883), the third daughter, married in 1826 Charles Barnett (1796–1876) of Stratton Park, High Sheriff of Bedfordshire in 1821 and Cambridgeshire Master of Foxhounds.
- Isabella Emma Payne, youngest daughter, married in 1838 James Elsden Everard of Congham (1806–1869). Payne with Samuel Parr "had much familiar correspondence, which became the property of his youngest daughter, Mrs. Elsdon [sic] Everard."

=== West Midlands and the Steward family ===
The Payne family moved from Bedfordshire to Solihull, as Payne explained in 1808 to Samuel Whitbread, for the sake of the education of their daughters. They then moved closer to the centre of Birmingham, and lived for a time at Winson Green. At this period it was an undeveloped area, quite recently created by the enclosure of Birmingham Heath. Around 1818 Charles Pye wrote

Ascending the hill, there is on the right an extensive view over the adjacent country, including Barr-beacon, Mr. Boulton's plantations, and Winson-green, a neat house, in the possession of Mrs. Steward.

Lieut. Col. Edward Samuel Steward (died 1853 aged 75) of Winson Green was Payne's brother-in-law; his mother Mary Steward mentioned above is therefore the sister of Capt. Carver and Col. Henry Carver in the next generation. This is according to a Johnstone family history by F. R. Grahame, a pseudonym of Catherine Laura Johnstone, Payne's granddaughter. The same book records a family gathering at Edgbaston Hall of the 1830s involving Paynes, Websters and Johnstones.

=== The soi-disant Payne baronets ===
The 1st and 2nd Baronets, Sir Charles Payne and Sir Gillies Payne, are not in doubt. A family dispute began in 1828 on who inherited the title from Sir Gillies Payne. The matter is now treated as void.

Descent from Peter Payne
Ordinal (assumed)	Name	Life span	Notes
3rd	Peter Payne	1762–1843	Claim as the eldest legitimate son of Sir Gillies Payne.
4th	Charles Gillies Payne	1793–1870	
5th	Salusbury Gillies Payne	1829–1893	
6th	Charles Robert Salusbury Payne	1859–1942	Discontinued claim to title in 1901. High Sheriff of Bedfordshire in 1911; of Hollybank House, Emsworth.

Descent from John Payne
Ordinal (assumed)	Name	Life span	Notes
3rd	John Payne	died 1803	His assumption of the title was not disputed by Peter Payne.
4th	Charles Payne	died 1841	Assumption not initially disputed.
5th	Coventry Payne	died 1849	
6th	Coventry Payne	died 1874	
7th	Philip Monoux Payne	1858–1935	

== Hunting ==
Payne was a "lifelong devotee of hunting", and an obituary of his son-in-law Charles Barnett identified him as "a contemporary of the hard riding school" of George Germain(e), the younger son of George Germain, 1st Viscount Sackville, and Sam Ongley. He hunted in Bedfordshire when still young with Charles Fyshe Palmer; they rode with the Oakley hounds, and they became long-term companions. Palmer, at Ickwell, was in Parliament for Reading, but took part in Bedfordshire politics in 1820. In later life Payne bought a house at Blunham, not far away. The Webster family into which Payne's eldest daughter married is described as "of good hunting stock", with Joseph Webster II dying in his thirties in a hunting accident.

Grantley Fitzhardinge Berkeley wrote about Payne as "that good old sportsman", when living at Knuston Hall, and a fox hunt over Yardley Chase which ended at Castle Ashby. Baily's Monthly Magazine in 1876 noted that "Sir Peter Payne, of Blunham House, father-in-law of Mr. Charles Barnett, was a most particular man about his weight, and would not carry letters to be franked because, he said, they made him heavy".
