= Sir Richard Gilpin, 1st Baronet =

English politician (1801–1882)

Gilpin baronets
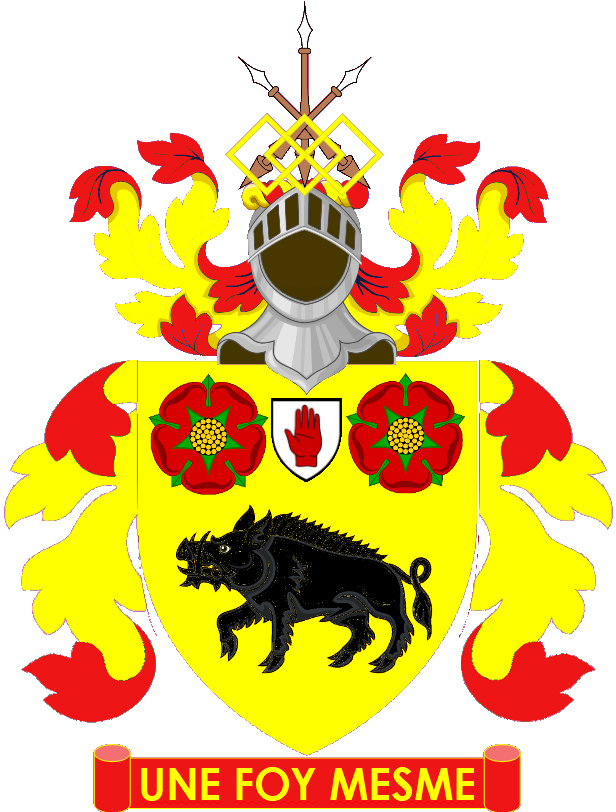
- Coat of arms of the Gilpin baronets of Hockcliffe Grange
- Creation date: 19 February 1876
- Status: extinct
- Extinction date: 8 April 1882
- Seat: Hockcliffe Grange
- Motto: Une Foy Mesme (The Same Faith)
- Arms: Or a boar passant Sable in chief two roses Gules barbed and seeded Proper
- Crest: In front of three tilting spears points upwards, one in pile and two in saltire Proper, as many mascles interlaced fesswise Or.

Sir Richard Thomas Gilpin, 1st Baronet (12 January 1801 – 8 April 1882) was an English Conservative politician who sat in the House of Commons from 1851 to 1880.

== Life ==
Gilpin was the only son of Richard Gilpin of Hockliffe, who was Lieutenant-Colonel of the Bedfordshire Militia, and his second wife, Sarah Wilkinson, fourth daughter of William Wilkinson of Westmorland. He was educated at Rugby School and at Christ's College, Cambridge and after a brief spell as a Captain in the Bedfordshire Militia in 1820 he joined the regular army. He served in the 14th Light Dragoons and the Rifle Brigade, eventually reaching the rank of Lieutenant-Colonel. As a half-pay officer he returned to the Bedfordshire Militia as Major under his father in 1840, was promoted to lieutenant-colonel in 1847 and then to Colonel the following year. At the time the Militia was moribund, but it was reorganised in 1852 and he commanded the regiment until 24 January 1879, when he became its Honorary Colonel.

He was also Deputy Lieutenant and J.P. for Bedfordshire and Buckinghamshire and High Sheriff of Bedfordshire in 1850.

In 1851 Gilpin was elected Member of Parliament for Bedfordshire. He held the seat until 1880. He was in favour of civil and religious liberty. He was created baronet 'of Hockliffe Grange, in the County of Bedford' on 19 February 1876.

== Death and memorial ==
Gilpin died at the age of 81. The officers of the Bedfordshire Militia placed a stained glass window in St Paul's Church, Bedford, in his memory. The 9th Duke of Bedford arranged for the 1855 Regimental colours to be placed by the sides of the memorial window when they were replaced in 1883.

== Family ==
In 1831, Gilpin married Louisa Turton, née Browne (d. 1871), former wife of Thomas Turton (later 2nd Baronet) whom she divorced for adultery in 1831 in a noted case Turton vs Turton of 1829–1831. She was the eldest daughter of General Gore Browne; her marriage of 1812 was dissolved by decision of the House of Lords. Louisa Turton was the second woman so permitted (after Mrs Addison in 1801), and the decision also allowed her to remarry.

Gilpin's entailed estates were inherited by his niece Amy Mary Louisa Meux-Smith, and her husband, the racehorse trainer Peter Valentine Purcell, who both adopted the surname Gilpin.

Parliament of the United Kingdom
Preceded by Viscount Alford; Francis Russell	Member of Parliament for Bedfordshire; 1851 – 1880; With: Francis Russell to 1872; Francis Bassett 1872–1875; Marquess of Tavistock from 1875	Succeeded by James Howard; Marquess of Tavistock
Baronetage of the United Kingdom
New creation	Baronet (of Hockcliffe Grange); 1876–1882	Extinct
Preceded by Scourfield baronets	Gilpin baronets of Hockliffe Grange; 19 February 1876	Succeeded by Leslie baronets
