= George Russell, 10th Duke of Bedford =

British peer and politician

His Grace The Duke of Bedford DL
- Duke of Bedford
- Coat of arms: Russell arms.svg
- Tenure: 14 January 1891 – 23 March 1893
- Successor: Herbrand Russell, 11th Duke of Bedford
- Other titles: 10th Marquess of Tavistock; 14th Earl of Bedford; 14th Baron Russell; 12th Baron Russell of Thornhaugh; 10th Baron Howland
- Born: 16 April 1852
- Died: 23 March 1893 (aged 40)
- Spouse: Dame Adeline Russell, GBE (m. 1876)
- Parents: Francis Russell, 9th Duke of Bedford; Elizabeth Sackville-West

George William Francis Sackville Russell, 10th Duke of Bedford DL (16 April 1852 – 23 March 1893) was a British peer and politician. He was the son of Francis Russell, 9th Duke of Bedford and Lady Elizabeth Sackville-West.

Russell graduated from Balliol College, Oxford in 1874 with a Bachelor of Arts (B.A.) and was admitted to Lincoln's Inn, as a barrister.

On 24 October 1876, he married Lady Adeline Marie Somers, daughter of Charles Somers, 3rd Earl Somers. They had no children, but it is known that he had at least two illegitimate children. He had an Anglo-Indian daughter, who lived with the pair until her father died and was then sent to live with her uncle, Herbrand Russell, and his family. She lived on the estate until she was married. The second child was a son with Florence Lane-Fox, daughter of Sackville Walter Lane-Fox.

Russell was a Liberal Member of Parliament for Bedfordshire between 1875 and 1885, when the constituency was abolished. He was High Sheriff of Bedfordshire in 1889 and was later a Deputy Lieutenant of the county.

In 1891, Russell inherited the title of Duke of Bedford, together with Woburn Abbey and several other estates which went with it, including Chenies, Buckinghamshire, and the Bedford Estate, a sizeable area of central London including Bedford Square, Russell Square, Bloomsbury Square and Covent Garden.

In 1893, at the age of forty, he died of diabetes, at number 37, Chesham Place, London, and was buried in the 'Bedford Chapel' at St. Michael's Church at Chenies. His titles and estates were inherited by his younger brother Herbrand Russell.

Parliament of the United Kingdom
| Preceded by Sir Richard Gilpin, Bt; Francis Bassett | Member of Parliament for Bedfordshire; 1875–1885; With: Sir Richard Gilpin, Bt 1875–1880; James Howard 1880–1885 | Constituency abolished |
Peerage of England
| Preceded by Francis Russell | Duke of Bedford; 1891–1893 | Succeeded by Herbrand Russell |
