= William Russell, 8th Duke of Bedford =

British Whig politician

His Grace The Duke of Bedford
- Arms of the Duke of Bedford
- Tenure: 14 May 1861 – 27 May 1872
- Predecessor: Francis Russell, 7th Duke of Bedford
- Successor: Francis Russell, 9th Duke of Bedford
- Other titles: 8th Marquess of Tavistock; 12th Earl of Bedford; 12th Baron Russell; 10th Baron Russell of Thornhaugh; 8th Baron Howland
- Born: 1 July 1809
- Died: 27 May 1872 (aged 62)
- Parents: Francis Russell, 7th Duke of Bedford; Lady Anna Stanhope

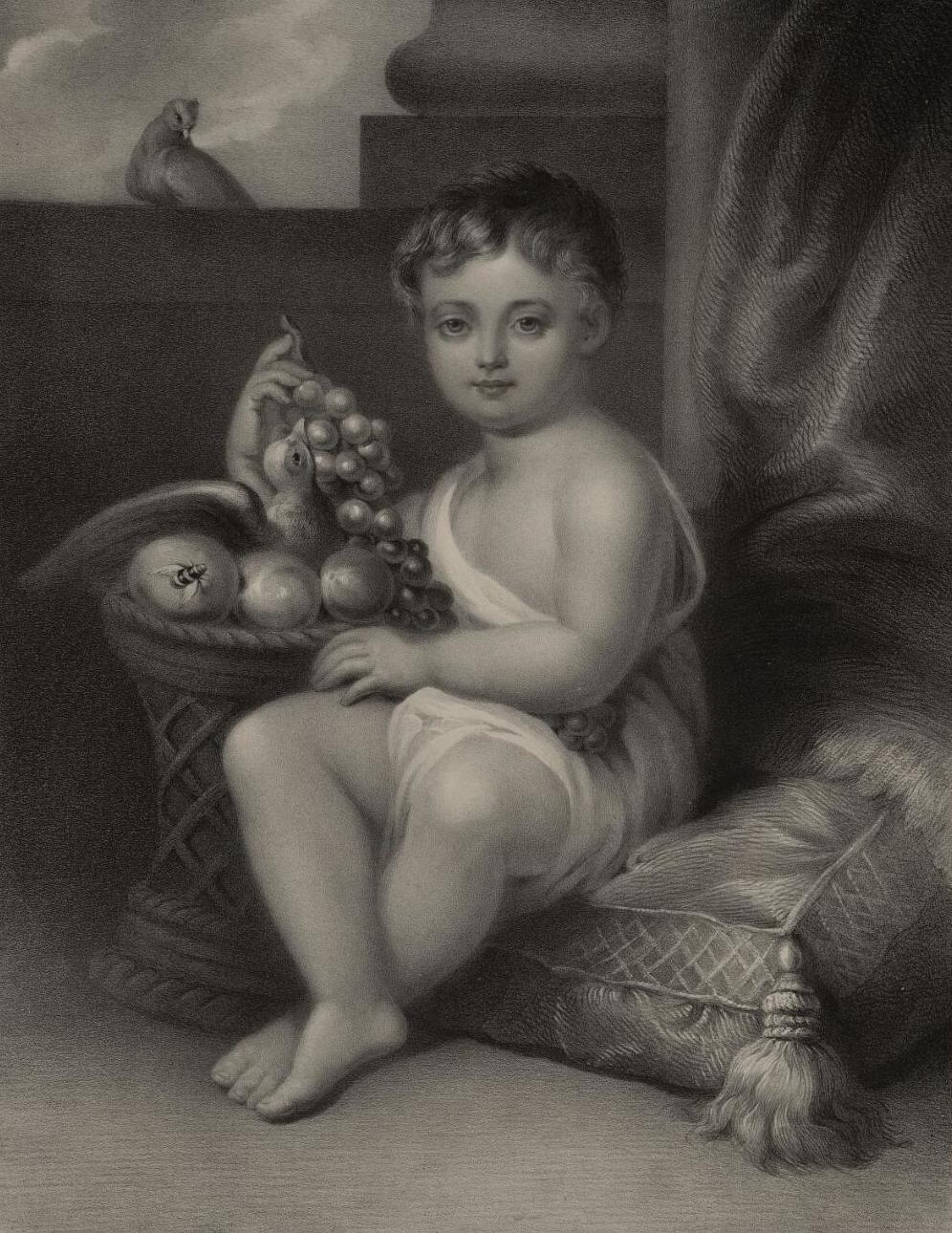
Portrait of Lord Russell as a child

William Russell, 8th Duke of Bedford (1 July 1809 – 27 May 1872) styled Marquess of Tavistock from 1839 to 1861, was a British Whig politician. He was the son of Francis Russell, 7th Duke of Bedford and his wife Anna Maria Stanhope.

Russell was educated at Eton College and Christ Church, Oxford and was member of parliament (MP) for Tavistock (which had been represented by members of the Russell family intermittently since 1640) from 1832 to 1841.

He died in 1872, aged 62, unmarried and childless, and was buried in the 'Bedford Chapel' at St. Michael's Church, Chenies, Buckinghamshire. His titles passed to his cousin, Francis Hastings Russell, 9th Duke of Bedford.

Parliament of the United Kingdom
Preceded by John Hawkins; Francis Russell	Member of Parliament for Tavistock; 1832–1841; With: Charles Fox; John Rundle 1835	Succeeded by John Rundle; Lord Edward Russell
Peerage of England
Preceded by Francis Russell	Duke of Bedford; 1861–1872	Succeeded by Francis Russell
