= Bedfordshire (UK Parliament constituency) =

Parliamentary constituency in the United Kingdom, 1801–1885

- Former county constituency for the House of Commons

1290–1885
- Seats: two
- Replaced by: Biggleswade and Luton

Bedfordshire was a United Kingdom Parliamentary constituency, which elected two Members of Parliament to the House of Commons of England from 1295 until 1707, then the House of Commons of Great Britain until 1801 and the House of Commons of the United Kingdom until 1885 when it was divided into two constituencies under the Redistribution of Seats Act 1885.

== History ==
The constituency consisted of the historic county of Bedfordshire. (Although Bedfordshire contained the borough of Bedford, which elected two MPs in its own right, this was not excluded from the county constituency, and owning property within the borough could confer a vote at the county election.)

As in other county constituencies the franchise between 1430 and 1832 was defined by the Forty Shilling Freeholder Act 1430, which gave the right to vote to every man who possessed freehold property within the county valued at £2 or more per year for the purposes of land tax; it was not necessary for the freeholder to occupy his land, nor even in later years to be resident in the county at all.

At the time of the Great Reform Act 1832, Bedfordshire had a population of approximately 95,000, but under 4,000 votes were cast at the election of 1826, and under 3,000 in election of 1830, even though each voter could cast two votes. Although local landowners could never control a county the size of Bedfordshire in the way they could own a pocket borough, titled magnates still exercised considerable influence over deferential county voters, and the Duke of Bedford was regarded as the hereditary "patron" of the constituency.

Elections were held at a single polling place, Bedford, and voters from the rest of the county had to travel to the county town to exercise their franchise. In many other counties this could make the cost of a contested election prohibitive, since it was normal for voters to expect the candidates for whom they voted to meet their expenses in travelling to the poll; but this was less of a factor in a small county like Bedfordshire, and contested elections were not uncommon.

Under the terms of the Great Reform Act 1832, the county franchise was extended to occupiers of land worth £50 or more, as well as the forty-shilling freeholders, but Bedfordshire was otherwise left unchanged. Under the new rules, 3,966 were registered and entitled to vote at the general election of 1832. While Bedford remained the place of election, where nominations were taken and the result declared, polling also took place at Luton, Leighton Buzzard, Ampthill, Biggleswade and Sharnbrook.

Under the Redistribution of Seats Act 1885, the constituency was abolished and the county divided into two single-member county constituencies, Biggleswade and Luton.

== Members of Parliament ==
MPs 1290-1640 — MPs 1640-1885 — Elections — See also — Notes

=== MPs 1290–1640 ===
- Constituency created (1290)

Parliament	First member	Second member
Parliament of 1295	Sir David Flitwick	
Parliament of 1313 (Jul)	Peter de Loring	David Flitwick, K.B.
Parliament of 1313 (Sep)	Sir Peter de Loring	Sir David Flitwick, K.B.
Parliament of 1316	Roger Dakeney	
Parliament of 1322 (Sep)	John Morice or Moriz	
Good Parliament (1376)	Johannes Trayle	
Parliament of Jan 1377	Sir Gerard Braybrooke I	
Parliament of 1379	William Mordaunt	
Parliament of 1381	Johannes Trayle	
Parliament of 1385	Reynold Ragon	
Parliament of 1386	Ralph Fitzrichard	John Hervey
Parliament of Feb 1388	Sir Gerard Braybrooke II	Robert Digswell
Parliament of Sep 1388	William Terrington	Ralph Walton
Parliament of Jan 1390	William Terrington	Baldwin Pigot
Parliament of Nov 1390	Sir Gerard Braybrooke I	Thomas Zouche
Parliament of 1391	William Terrington	Ralph Walton
Parliament of 1393	William Terrington	John Worship
Parliament of 1394	Reynold Regan	John Worship
Parliament of 1395	Philip Walwyn	Giles Daubeney
Parliament of Jan 1397	William Terrington	John Worship
Parliament of Sep 1397	Sir Baldwin Pigot	John Worship
Parliament of 1399	Sir Gerard Braybrooke II	Sir Roger Beauchamp
Parliament of 1401	Sir Baldwin Pigot	Giles Daubeney
Parliament of 1402	Reynold Ragon	John Worship
Parliament of Jan 1404	Reynold Ragon	William Terrington
Parliament of Oct 1404	Thomas Durant	William Wenlock
Parliament of 1406	Thomas Durant	Hugh Hasilden
Parliament of 1407	William Bosom	John Worship
Parliament of 1409	Returns lost	
Parliament of 1411	Returns lost	
Parliament of May 1413	William Bosom	Thomas Waweton
Parliament of Apr 1414	John Goldington	Thomas Waweton
Parliament of Nov 1414	John Enderby	Roger Hunt
Parliament of Mar 1416	William Bosom	Roger Hunt
Parliament of 1417	William Bosom	Thomas Roxton
Parliament of 1419	John Enderby	Sir Thomas Waweton
Parliament of 1420	Robert Scott	Roger Hunt
Parliament of May 1421	John Goldington II	Thomas Mordaunt
Parliament of Dec 1421	Thomas Manningham	Henry Cockayne
Parliament of 1424	Sir Thomas Waweton	
Parliament of 1431	Sir Thomas Waweton	
Parliament of 1433	John Wenlock	
Parliament of 1436	John Wenlock	
Parliament of 1437	John Wenlock	
Parliament of 1439	John Wenlock	
Parliament of 1455	Sir John Wenlock	
Parliament of 1529	Sir William Gascoigne	George Acworth (died 1532); Sir John St John
Parliament of 1536	Sir William Gascoigne	
Parliament of 1539	Sir John St John	John Gostwick
Parliament of 1542	Sir John St John	Sir John Gascoigne
Parliament of 1545	John Gostwick, died 1545	Edmund Conquest
Parliament of 1547–1552	Oliver St John	Lewis Dyve
Parliament of March 1553	Sir Humphrey Radclyffe	Lewis Dyve
Parliament of October 1553	Sir John Gascoigne	Sir John Mordaunt
Parliament of 1554	Sir Humphrey Radclyffe	Sir John Mordaunt
Parliament of 1554-1555	Sir Humphrey Radclyffe	Sir John Mordaunt
Parliament of 1555	Sir Humphrey Radclyffe	Sir John Mordaunt
Parliament of 1558	Sir Humphrey Radclyffe	Sir John Gascoigne
Parliament of 1559	John St John	Thomas Pigott
Parliament of 1563–1567	Hon. John St John	Lewis Mordaunt
Parliament of 1571	George Rotheram	Thomas Snagge
Parliament of 1572–1583	George Rotheram	Sir Henry Cheyne (1572 - created a peer); John Thomson (1572-1583)
Parliament of 1584–1585	George Rotheram	Nicholas Luke
Parliament of 1586–1587	George Rotheram	Thomas Snagge
Parliament of 1588–1589	Hon. Oliver St John	Edward Radclyffe
Parliament of 1593	Hon. Oliver St John	George Rotheram
Parliament of 1597–1598	Sir Edward Radclyffe	Nicholas Luke
Parliament of 1601	Sir Edward Radclyffe	Hon. Oliver St John
Parliament of 1604–1611	Sir Edward Radclyffe	Hon. Oliver St John
Addled Parliament (1614)	Sir Henry Grey	Sir Oliver Luke
Parliament of 1621-1622	Sir Beauchamp St John	Sir Oliver Luke
Happy Parliament (1624-1625)	Oliver St John	Sir Oliver Luke
Useless Parliament (1625)	Oliver St John	Sir Oliver Luke
Parliament of 1625-1626	Oliver St John	Sir Oliver Luke
Parliament of 1628-1629	Oliver St John	Sir Oliver Luke
No Parliament summoned 1629-1640

Back to Members of Parliament

=== MPs 1640–1885 ===
Year	First member	First party	Second member	Second party
April 1640	The Lord Wentworth	Royalist	Sir Oliver Luke	Parliamentarian
1641	Roger Burgoyne	Parliamentarian	Sir Oliver Luke	Parliamentarian
December 1648	Burgoyne and Luke excluded in Pride's Purge - both seats vacant			
1653	Nathaniel Taylor		Edward Cater	

Representation increased to five members in First and Second Parliaments of the Protectorate
Year	First member	Second member	Third member	Fourth member	Fifth member
1654	Sir William Boteler	John Harvey	Edmund Wingate	John Neale	Samuel Bedford
1656	Sir William Boteler	John Harvey	Richard Wagstaffe	Richard Edwards	Samuel Bedford

Representation reverted to two members in Third Protectorate Parliament
Year	First member	First party	Second member	Second party
January 1659	Major Richard Wagstaffe		Colonel John Okey	
May 1659	Not represented in the restored Rump			
9 April 1660	Lord Bruce of Whorlton		Samuel Browne	
10 April 1661	Lord Bruce of Whorlton		Sir Humphrey Winch, 1st Bt	
2 May 1664	Sir John Napier, 4th Bt		Sir Humphrey Winch, 1st Bt	
18 February 1679	Lord Russell	Whig	Sir Humphrey Monoux, 2nd Bt	
1 September 1679	Lord Russell	Whig	Sir Humphrey Monoux, 2nd Bt	
14 February 1681	Lord Russell	Whig	Sir Humphrey Monoux, 2nd Bt	
10 March 1685	Sir Villiers Chernock, 2nd Bt		William Boteler	
11 January 1689	Lord Edward Russell	Whig	William Duncombe	Whig
27 February 1690	Lord Edward Russell	Whig	Thomas Browne	
2 November 1695	Lord Edward Russell	Whig	William Duncombe	Whig
20 July 1698	Lord Edward Russell	Whig	Sir William Gostwick, 4th Bt	Whig
c. January 1701	Lord Edward Russell	Whig	Sir William Gostwick, 4th Bt	Whig
11 December 1701	Lord Edward Russell	Whig	Sir William Gostwick, 4th Bt	Whig
22 July 1702	Lord Edward Russell	Whig	Sir William Gostwick, 4th Bt	Whig
23 May 1705	Sir Pynsent Chernock, 3rd Bt	Tory	Sir William Gostwick, 4th Bt	Whig
19 May 1708	Lord Edward Russell	Whig	Sir William Gostwick, 4th Bt	Whig
5 October 1710	Lord Edward Russell	Whig	Sir William Gostwick, 4th Bt	Whig
2 September 1713	Sir Pynsent Chernock, 3rd Bt	Tory	John Harvey	Tory
16 February 1715	William Hillersden	Whig	John Harvey	Tory
19 July 1715	William Hillersden	Whig	John Cater	Whig
4 April 1722	Hon. Charles Leigh	Tory	Sir Rowland Alston, 4th Bt	Whig
1 September 1727	Hon. Pattee Byng		Sir Rowland Alston, 4th Bt	Whig
16 February 1733	Charles Leigh	Tory	Sir Rowland Alston, 4th Bt	Whig
24 April 1734	Hon. John Spencer		Sir Rowland Alston, 4th Bt	Whig
26 February 1735	Sir Roger Burgoyne, 6th Bt	Whig	Sir Rowland Alston, 4th Bt	Whig
18 May 1741	Sir Roger Burgoyne, 6th Bt	Whig	Sir John Chester, 6th Bt	Tory
6 July 1747	Sir Danvers Osborn, 3rd Bt	Tory	Thomas Alston	Tory
5 December 1753	The Earl of Upper Ossory	Whig	Thomas Alston	Tory
24 April 1754	The Earl of Upper Ossory	Whig	Thomas Alston	Tory
13 December 1758	Henry Osborn	Tory	Thomas Alston	Tory
1 April 1761	Marquess of Tavistock	Whig	Robert Henley-Ongley	Tory
7 April 1767	The Earl of Upper Ossory	Whig	Robert Henley-Ongley	Tory
28 March 1768	The Earl of Upper Ossory	Whig	Robert Henley-Ongley	Tory
21 October 1774	The Earl of Upper Ossory	Whig	Robert Henley-Ongley	Tory
27 September 1780	The Earl of Upper Ossory	Whig	Hon. St Andrew St John	Whig
19 April 1784	The Earl of Upper Ossory	Whig	Hon. St Andrew St John	Whig
1 July 1784	The Earl of Upper Ossory	Whig	The Lord Ongley	Tory
19 May 1785	The Earl of Upper Ossory	Whig	Hon. St Andrew St John	Whig
28 June 1790	The Earl of Upper Ossory	Whig	Hon. St Andrew St John	Whig
15 September 1794	John Osborn	Tory	Hon. St Andrew St John	Whig
31 May 1796	John Osborn	Tory	Hon. St Andrew St John	Whig
10 July 1802	John Osborn	Tory	Hon. St Andrew St John	Whig
5 July 1806	John Osborn	Tory	Francis Pym	Whig
11 May 1807	Hon. Richard FitzPatrick	Whig	Francis Pym	Whig
14 October 1812	Marquess of Tavistock	Whig	Francis Pym	Whig
23 June 1818	Marquess of Tavistock	Whig	Sir John Osborn, 5th Bt	Tory
21 March 1820	Marquess of Tavistock	Whig	Francis Pym	Whig
15 June 1826	Marquess of Tavistock	Whig	Thomas Potter Macqueen	Tory
9 August 1830	Marquess of Tavistock	Whig	William Stuart	Tory
5 May 1831	Marquess of Tavistock	Whig	Peter Payne	Whig
1832	Lord Charles Russell	Whig	William Stuart	Tory
1834	Lord Charles Russell	Whig	William Stuart	Conservative
1835	Lord Charles Russell	Whig	Viscount Alford	Conservative
1841	William Astell	Conservative	Viscount Alford	Conservative
March 1847	Lord Charles Russell	Whig	Viscount Alford	Conservative
August 1847	Francis Russell	Whig	Viscount Alford	Conservative
1851	Francis Russell	Whig	Sir Richard Gilpin, 1st Bt	Conservative
1859	Francis Russell	Liberal	Sir Richard Gilpin, 1st Bt	Conservative
1872	Francis Bassett	Liberal	Sir Richard Gilpin, 1st Bt	Conservative
1875	Marquess of Tavistock	Liberal	Sir Richard Gilpin, 1st Bt	Conservative
1880	Marquess of Tavistock	Liberal	James Howard	Liberal
1885	constituency divided: see Luton and Biggleswade			

Back to Members of Parliament

== Elections ==
1810s — 1820s — 1830s — 1840s — 1850s — 1860s — 1870s — 1880s — See also — Notes

=== Elections in the 1800s ===
- 1802: John Osborn (Tory) and Hon. St Andrew St John (Whig) elected unopposed
- 1806: Following the elevation of Hon. St Andrew St John to the House of Lords, Francis Pym (Whig) elected unopposed
- 1806: John Osborn (Tory) and Francis Pym (Whig) elected unopposed

General election 1807: Bedfordshire
Party	Candidate	Votes	%	±%
Whig	Francis Pym	1,138	34.6	N/A
Whig	Hon. Richard FitzPatrick	1,084	32.9	N/A
Tory	John Osborn	1,069	32.5	N/A
Majority		15	0.4	N/A
Registered electors		c. 2,000		
Whig hold				
Whig gain from Tory				

Back to Elections

=== Elections in the 1810s ===
- 1812: Marquess of Tavistock and Francis Pym (both Whig) elected unopposed
- 1818: Marquess of Tavistock (Whig) and Sir John Osborn, 5th Bt (Tory) elected unopposed

Back to Elections

=== Elections in the 1820s ===
General election 1820: Bedfordshire
Party	Candidate	Votes	%	±%
Whig	Marquess of Tavistock	1,458	36.6	N/A
Whig	Francis Pym	1,308	32.9	N/A
Tory	Sir John Osborn, 5th Bt	1,214	30.5	N/A
Majority		94	2.4	N/A
Turnout		3,980		N/A
Registered electors		c. 2,800		
Whig hold				
Whig gain from Tory				

General election 1826: Bedfordshire
Party	Candidate	Votes	%	±%
Tory	Thomas Potter Macqueen	1,515	39.6	+9.1
Whig	Marquess of Tavistock	1,273	33.3	−3.3
Whig	Francis Pym	1,040	27.2	−5.7
Majority		233	6.1	+3.7
Turnout		2,546	c.90.9	
Registered electors		c. 2,800		
Tory gain from Whig		Swing	+7.4	
Whig hold		Swing	−6.2	

Back to Elections

=== Elections in the 1830s ===
General election 1830: Bedfordshire
Party	Candidate	Votes	%
Whig	Francis Russell	Unopposed	
Tory	William Stuart	Unopposed	
Registered electors		c. 2,800	
Whig hold			
Tory hold			

General election 1831: Bedfordshire
Party	Candidate	Votes	%
Whig	Francis Russell	1,137	39.2
Whig	Peter Payne (MP)	1,073	37.0
Tory	William Stuart	690	23.8
Majority		383	13.2
Turnout		c. 1,450	c. 51.8
Registered electors		c. 2,800	
Whig hold			
Whig gain from Tory			

General election 1832: Bedfordshire
Party	Candidate	Votes	%	±%
Whig	Charles Russell	1,937	34.8	−4.4
Tory	William Stuart	1,871	33.6	+9.8
Whig	Peter Payne (MP)	1,756	31.6	−5.4
Turnout		3,478	87.7	c. +35.9
Registered electors		3,966		
Majority		66	1.2	−12.0
Whig hold		Swing	−4.7	
Majority		115	2.0	N/A
Tory gain from Whig		Swing	+9.8	

General election 1835: Bedfordshire
Party	Candidate	Votes	%
Whig	Charles Russell	Unopposed	
Conservative	John Egerton	Unopposed	
Registered electors		4,015	
Whig hold			
Conservative hold			

General election 1837: Bedfordshire
Party	Candidate	Votes	%
Whig	Charles Russell	Unopposed	
Conservative	John Egerton	Unopposed	
Registered electors		4,134	
Whig hold			
Conservative hold			

Back to Elections

=== Elections in the 1840s ===
General election 1841: Bedfordshire
Party	Candidate	Votes	%	±%
Conservative	William Astell	Unopposed		
Conservative	John Egerton	Unopposed		
Registered electors		4,333		
Conservative hold				
Conservative gain from Whig				

Astell's death caused a by-election.

By-election, 30 March 1847: Bedfordshire
Party	Candidate	Votes	%	±%
Whig	Charles Russell	Unopposed		
Whig gain from Conservative				

General election 1847: Bedfordshire
Party	Candidate	Votes	%	±%
Conservative	John Egerton	Unopposed		
Whig	Francis Russell	Unopposed		
Registered electors		4,339		
Conservative hold				
Whig gain from Conservative				

Back to Elections

=== Elections in the 1850s ===
Egerton's death caused a by-election.

By-election, 24 February 1851: Bedfordshire
Party	Candidate	Votes	%	±%
Conservative	Richard Gilpin	1,562	73.7	N/A
Radical	John Houghton	558	26.3	N/A
Majority		1,004	47.4	N/A
Turnout		2,120	52.1	N/A
Registered electors		4,071		
Conservative hold		Swing	N/A	

General election 1852: Bedfordshire
Party	Candidate	Votes	%	±%
Whig	Francis Russell	Unopposed		
Conservative	Richard Gilpin	Unopposed		
Registered electors		4,513		
Whig hold				
Conservative hold				

General election 1857: Bedfordshire
Party	Candidate	Votes	%	±%
Whig	Francis Russell	1,564	28.3	N/A
Conservative	Richard Gilpin	1,374	24.9	N/A
Whig	William Bartholomew Higgins	1,343	24.3	N/A
Conservative	William Stuart	1,246	22.5	N/A
Turnout		2,764 (est)	65.3 (est)	N/A
Registered electors		4,231		
Majority		190	3.4	N/A
Whig hold		Swing	N/A	
Majority		31	0.6	N/A
Conservative hold		Swing	N/A	

General election 1859: Bedfordshire
Party	Candidate	Votes	%	±%
Conservative	Richard Gilpin	2,027	37.2	−10.2
Liberal	Francis Russell	1,837	33.7	+5.4
Liberal	William Bartholomew Higgins	1,583	29.1	+4.8
Majority		190	3.5	+2.9
Turnout		3,737 (est)	79.5 (est)	+14.2
Registered electors		4,701		
Conservative hold		Swing	−10.2	
Liberal hold		Swing	+5.3	

Back to Elections

=== Elections in the 1860s ===
General election 1865: Bedfordshire
Party	Candidate	Votes	%	±%
Liberal	Francis Russell	Unopposed		
Conservative	Richard Gilpin	Unopposed		
Registered electors		4,845		
Liberal hold				
Conservative hold				

General election 1868: Bedfordshire
Party	Candidate	Votes	%	±%
Liberal	Francis Russell	Unopposed		
Conservative	Richard Gilpin	Unopposed		
Registered electors		6,680		
Liberal hold				
Conservative hold				

Back to Elections

=== Elections in the 1870s ===
Russell succeeded to the peerage, becoming Duke of Bedford and causing a by-election.

By-election, 27 Jun 1872: Bedfordshire
Party	Candidate	Votes	%	±%
Liberal	Francis Bassett	2,450	52.1	N/A
Conservative	William Stuart	2,250	47.9	N/A
Majority		200	4.2	N/A
Turnout		4,700	71.4	N/A
Registered electors		6,580		
Liberal hold				

General election 1874: Bedfordshire
Party	Candidate	Votes	%	±%
Liberal	Francis Bassett	Unopposed		
Conservative	Richard Gilpin	Unopposed		
Registered electors		6,874		
Liberal hold				
Conservative hold				

Bassett's resignation caused a by-election.

By-election, 28 Apr 1875: Bedfordshire
Party	Candidate	Votes	%	±%
Liberal	George Russell	Unopposed		
Liberal hold				

Back to Elections

=== Elections in the 1880s ===
General election 1880: Bedfordshire
Party	Candidate	Votes	%	±%
Liberal	James Howard	3,143	36.0	N/A
Liberal	George Russell	3,088	35.4	N/A
Conservative	William Stuart	2,500	28.6	N/A
Majority		588	6.8	N/A
Turnout		5,643 (est)	79.1 (est)	N/A
Registered electors		7,133		
Liberal hold		Swing	N/A	
Liberal gain from Conservative		Swing	N/A	

Back to Elections

== See also ==
- List of former United Kingdom Parliament constituencies
- Unreformed House of Commons
