= Tempsford Hall =

Country house in Bedfordshire, UK

Coordinates: 52.1675°N 0.2980°W

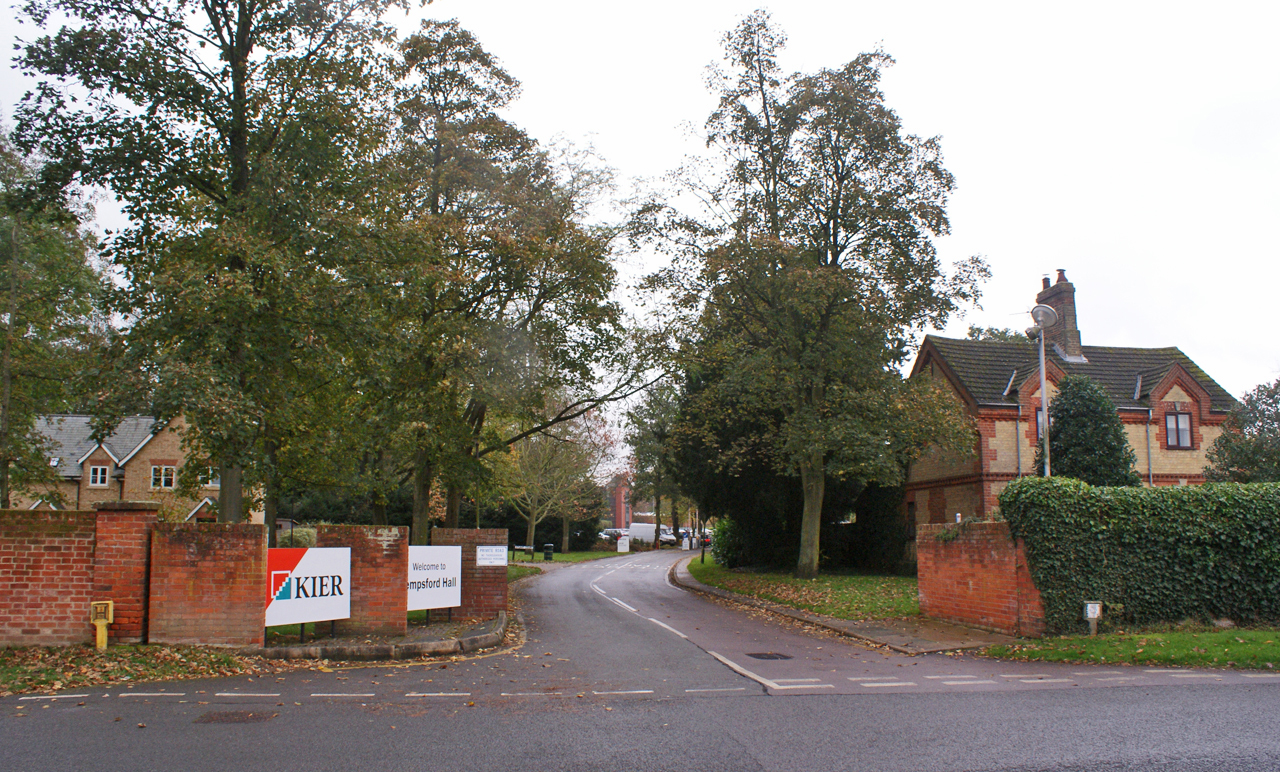
Entrance to Tempsford Hall

Tempsford Hall is a country house in Tempsford, Bedfordshire, England.

== History ==
The original hall was built in 1769 for Sir Gillies Payne; it remained in the Payne family until 1824 when it was sold to Colonel William Stuart. Following a fire in November 1898 the house was rebuilt and completed in 1903. In 1933 Millicent the last of the Stuart family died and the hall and estate passed to a second cousin Kathleen Ann Pole Wynne, who had been born a member of the Stuart family. In 1938 the Hall was leased by Dr Henry Ward Hales who used it as a clinic. He later purchased the freehold in 1946.

During World War II it was used by the Special Operations Executive as an agent reception and pre-flight preparation centre.

In 1964 Hales sold it to the Kier Group construction business. In October 2019, financially troubled Kier announced it was selling its Tempsford Hall headquarters to raise cash from its property assets, and head office functions were transferred to Kier's Manchester office in April 2020.
