= Lord Charles Russell =

British soldier and Whig politician

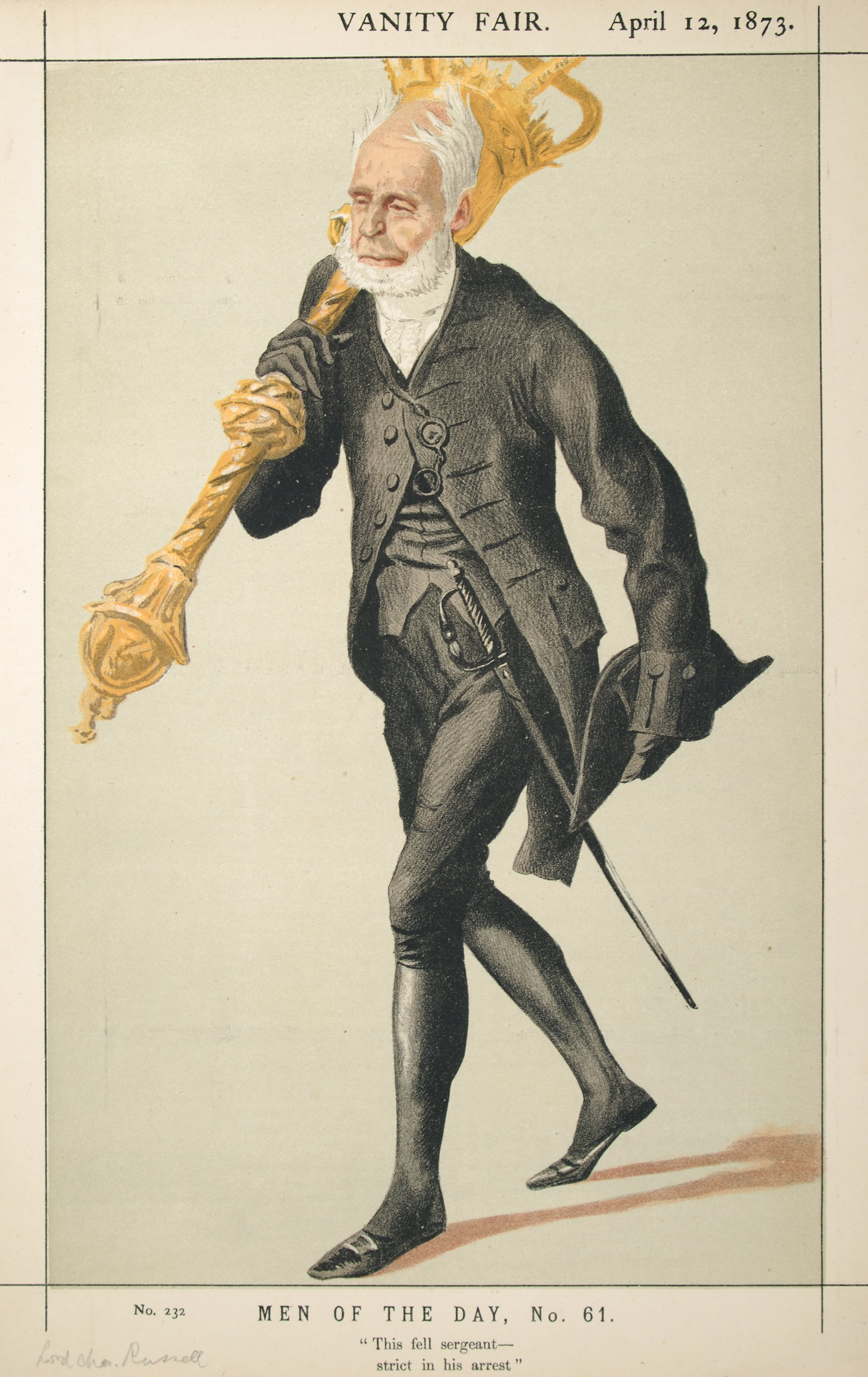
- Russell as portrayed by James Tissot in Vanity Fair, 12 April 1873. Caption reads This fell sergeant - strict in this arrest

Member of Parliament for Bedfordshire
- In office 1832-1841; March - August 1847

Personal details
- Born: 10 February 1807
- Died: 29 June 1894 (aged 87)
- Party: Whig
- Spouse: Isabella Davies (m. 1834; died 1884)
- Children: 5, including George
- Parent: John Russell (father)
- Relatives: Edward Russell (brother); Alexander Russell (brother); Francis Russell (half-brother); George Russell (half-brother); John Russell (half-brother); Thomas Russell (grandson); Francis Russell (grandfather); Alexander Gordon (grandfather)
- Military career
- Rank: Lieutenant-Colonel
- Units: 52nd Regiment; Royal Horse Guards

Lord Charles James Fox Russell (10 February 1807 – 29 June 1894), was a British soldier and Whig politician.

== Background ==
Russell was the third son of John Russell, 6th Duke of Bedford, by his second wife Lady Georgiana, daughter of Alexander Gordon, 4th Duke of Gordon. Francis Russell, 7th Duke of Bedford, Lord George Russell and John Russell, 1st Earl Russell were his elder half-brothers and Lord Edward Russell and Lord Alexander Russell his full brothers.

== Cricket ==
An amateur cricketer, Russell played for the Marylebone Cricket Club between 1833 and 1846.

== Career ==
Russell was a Lieutenant-Colonel in both the 52nd Regiment and the Royal Horse Guards. In 1832 he was returned to Parliament for Bedfordshire, a seat he held until 1841 and again briefly in 1847. In 1848 he was appointed Serjeant-at-Arms of the House of Commons, which he remained until 1875.

== Family ==
Russell married Isabella Clarissa, daughter of William Griffith Davies, in 1834. They had two sons: Henry Charles Russell (the father of Thomas Wentworth Russell) and George W. E. Russell, as well as three daughters. Lady Charles Russell died in June 1884. Russell survived her by ten years and died in June 1894, aged 87.

== Ancestry ==
Ancestors of Lord Charles Russell

16. Wriothesley Russell, 2nd Duke of Bedford
8. John Russell, 4th Duke of Bedford
17. Elizabeth Howland
4. Francis Russell, Marquess of Tavistock
18. John Leveson-Gower, 1st Earl Gower
9. The Hon. Gertrude Leveson-Gower
19. Lady Evelyn Pierrepont
2. John Russell, 6th Duke of Bedford
20. Arnold van Keppel, 1st Earl of Albemarle
10. Willem van Keppel, 2nd Earl of Albemarle
21. Geertruid Johanna Quirina van der Duyn
5. Lady Elizabeth Keppel
22. Charles Lennox, 1st Duke of Richmond
11. Lady Anne Lennox
23. Anne Brudenell
1. Lord Charles Russell
24. Alexander Gordon, 2nd Duke of Gordon
12. Cosmo Gordon, 3rd Duke of Gordon
25. Lady Henrietta Mordaunt
6. Alexander Gordon, 4th Duke of Gordon
26. William Gordon, 2nd Earl of Aberdeen
13. Lady Catherine Gordon
27. Lady Susan Murray
3. Lady Georgina Gordon
28. Sir Alexander Maxwell, 2nd Baronet of Monreith, Wigtownshire
14. Sir William Maxwell, 3rd Baronet of Monreith, Wigtownshire
29. Lady Jean Montgomerie
7. Jane Maxwell
30. William Blair
15. Magdalen Blair
31. Catharine Tait

Parliament of the United Kingdom
Preceded by The Marquess of Tavistock; Peter Payne	Member of Parliament for Bedfordshire; 1832–1841; With: William Stuart 1832–1835; Viscount Alford 1835–1841	Succeeded by Viscount Alford; William Thornton Astell
Preceded by Viscount Alford; William Thornton Astell	Member of Parliament for Bedfordshire; March 1847 – August 1847; With: Viscount Alford	Succeeded by Viscount Alford; Francis Russell
Government offices
Preceded by Sir William Gosset	Serjeant-at-Arms of the House of Commons; 1848–1875	Succeeded by Sir Ralph Gosset
