= William Stuart (1825–1893) =

British politician

Member of Parliament for Bedford
- In office 1854–1857; 1859-1868

Personal details
- Born: 7 March 1825
- Died: 21 December 1893 (aged 68)
- Party: Conservative
- Spouse: Katherine Nicholson (m. 1859; died 1881)
- Parent: William Stuart (father)
- Relatives: William Stuart (grandfather); Charles Pole (grandfather)

William Stuart (7 March 1825 – 21 December 1893), was a British Conservative politician.

== Biography ==
A member of the Stuart family, headed by the Marquess of Bute, he was the son of Sir William Stuart and his wife, Henrietta Mariah Sarah, daughter of Admiral Sir Charles Pole. He was returned to Parliament for Bedford in 1854, a seat he held until 1857 and again from 1859 to 1868. Apart from his political career, Stuart was also a justice of the peace for Hertfordshire, Huntingdonshire and Bedfordshire, a deputy lieutenant of Bedfordshire and High Sheriff of Bedfordshire in 1875. He resided at Tempsford Hall, Bedfordshire, and Aldenham Abbey, Hertfordshire.

In 1859, Stuart married Katherine, daughter of John Armytage Nicholson. They had several children. She died in October 1881. Stuart survived her by twelve years, dying in December 1893, aged 68.

Parliament of the United Kingdom
Preceded by Henry Stuart; Samuel Whitbread	Member of Parliament for Bedford; 1854–1857; With: Samuel Whitbread	Succeeded by Samuel Whitbread; Thomas Barnard
Preceded by Samuel Whitbread; Thomas Barnard	Member of Parliament for Bedford; 1859–1868; With: Thomas Barnard	Succeeded by Samuel Whitbread; James Howard
