= James Howard (agriculturalist) =

English agriculturalist and politician

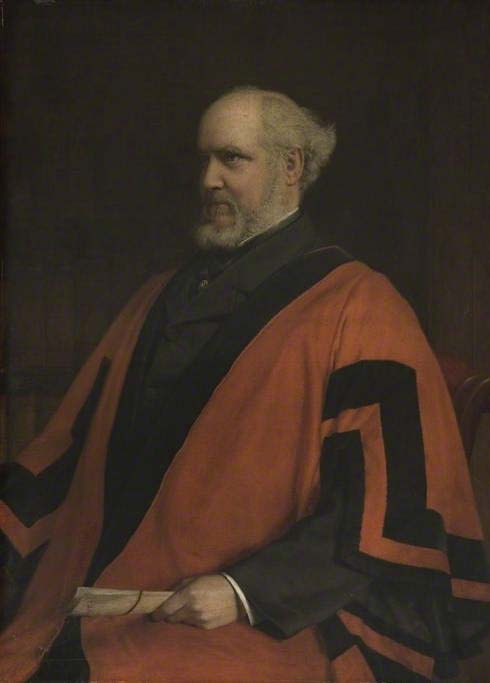
- Born: 1820; Bedford, England
- Died: 1889; Bedford, England
- Education: Bedford Modern School

James Howard (1821–1889), was an English agriculturalist, Liberal politician, manufacturer, and Bedfordshire landowner. In respect of his business acumen, Sir Bernard Burke wrote that James Howard had 'by his inventive genius and business talents restored the family to its former position and wealth'.

== Life ==
Howard was one of the sons of John Howard, of Cauldwell House, Bedford, and was educated at Bedford Modern School where he excelled and taught Junior School classes whilst still a pupil.

With his brother Frederick (later Sir Frederick Howard Kt) he founded James & Frederick Howard, a company which made agricultural machinery at the Britannia Works in Bedford. In respect of his business acumen, Sir Bernard Burke wrote that James Howard had 'by his inventive genius and business talents restored the family to its former position and wealth'.

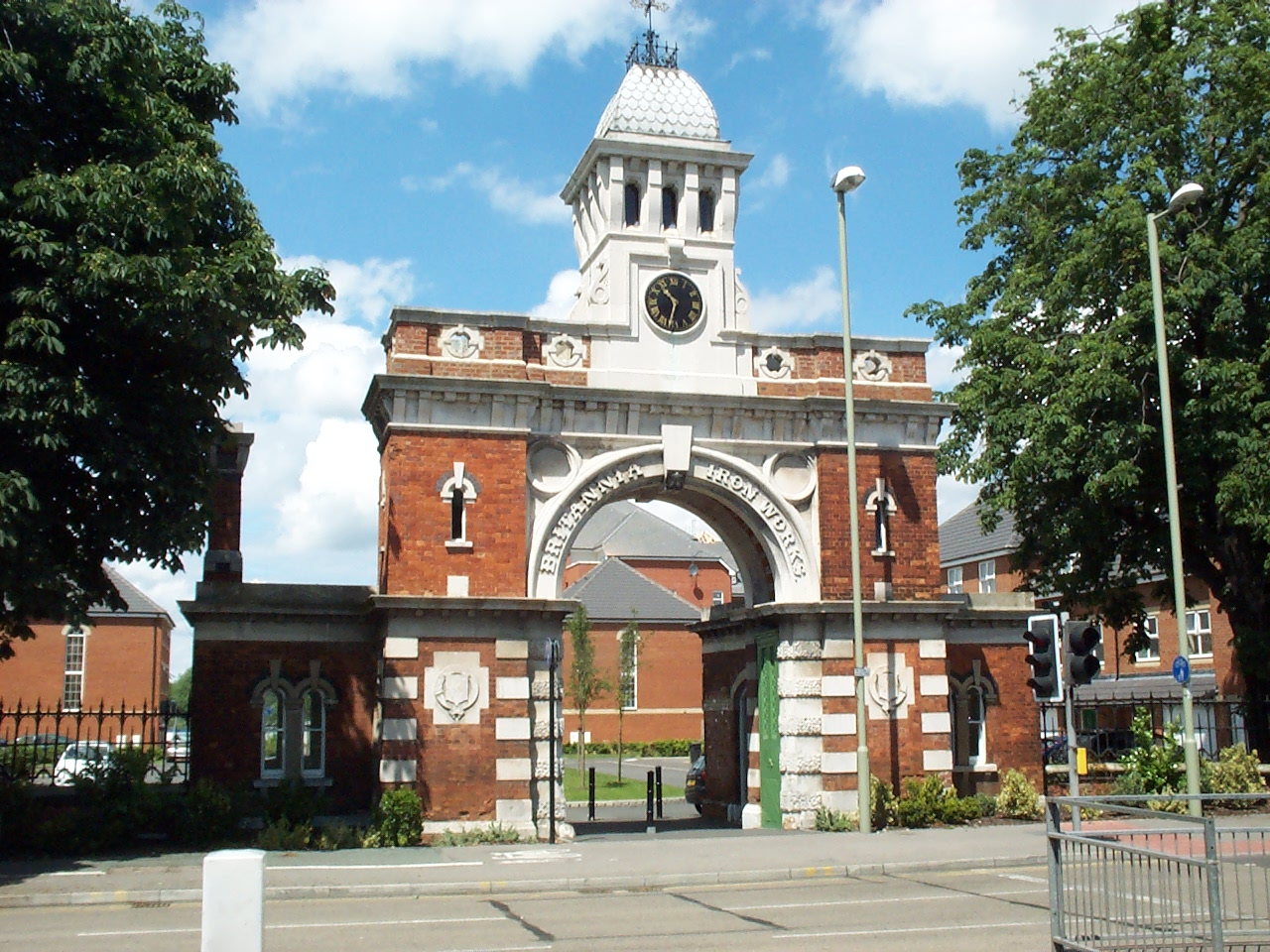
Victorian Gate of the Britannia Works, 2007

In 1862, Howard bought a large part of the Clapham, Bedfordshire, estates of Bertram Ashburnham, 4th Earl of Ashburnham, and established a model farm there, farming his land under new scientific methods. Howard was Mayor of Bedford in 1863 and 1864 and, in 1868, he was elected as one of the two members of parliament for the Bedford constituency, but he lost the seat to a Conservative in 1874. In 1872, he built Clapham Park, a new Victorian country house in an Elizabethan style standing on high ground to the south of Clapham Wood. In 1880, he returned to the House of Commons as member for the Bedfordshire county constituency, which he represented until it was abolished in 1885.

In 1885, Howard was one of the two vice-presidents of the National Pig Breeders' Association, which had been founded in 1884 and which would later become the British Pig Breeders Association. He wrote in 1881 that over twenty years he had bred thousands of pigs, trying the Large, Middle, and Small Whites and the Berkshires, and had crossed the Whites with the Berkshire. For rapid growth and profitability his preferred breed was the Large White, but he was "far from decrying the Berkshires".

== Visit of Garibaldi ==
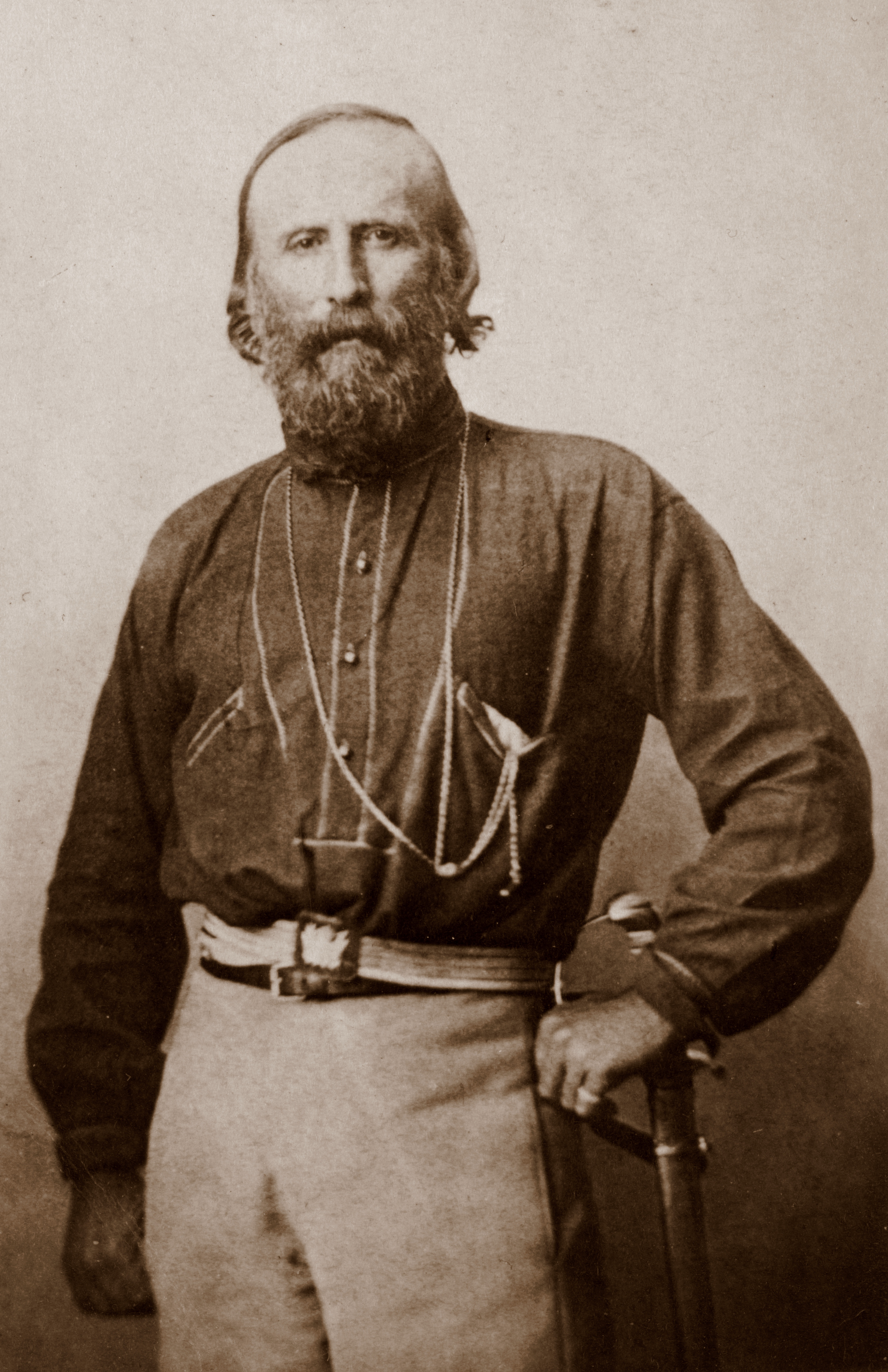
Giuseppe Garibaldi, celebrated as one of the greatest generals of modern times and as the "Hero of the Two Worlds" because of his military enterprises in South America and Europe, who fought in many military campaigns that led to Italian unification

On 15 April 1864, while Howard was Mayor of Bedford, Giuseppe Garibaldi visited the town and was entertained by Howard. In the morning, he visited the Howard brothers' Britannia Works and planted a Giant Sequoia (then known as the Wellingtonia gigantea) on the lawn there as a memento of his visit. After hearing speeches from the town's Corporation, Garibaldi proceeded to James Howard's Clapham Park Farm, where he saw a steam-powered plough. Howard then hosted a luncheon for Garibaldi at his house in Caudwell Street, Bedford, the guests including Samuel Whitbread MP, Lady Antrim, the 3rd Duke of Sutherland, Lord Albert Leveson-Gower, Lord Alfred Paget, Menotti Garibaldi, and Mr and Mrs Frederick Howard. Garibaldi toasted the Howard brothers: "I am quite happy to be here today and I thank you much for your great kindness I give my thanks to this family of Howard who have done so much for agriculture; and I give thanks also to this good company. I shall never forget you and my visit here: and I will now drink to you". The Giant Sequoia planted by Garibaldi in Bedford was later hit by a lightning strike and now only a stump remains. A local councillor petitioned in 2005 that this remnant be sculpted into a bust of Garibaldi.

Parliament of the United Kingdom
Preceded by Samuel Whitbread; William Stuart	Member of Parliament for Bedford; 1868–1874; With: Samuel Whitbread	Succeeded by Samuel Whitbread; Frederick Charles Polhill-Turner
Preceded by Sir Richard Gilpin, Bt; Marquess of Tavistock	Member of Parliament for Bedfordshire; 1880–1885; With: Marquess of Tavistock	Constituency abolished
