= William Astell =

English banker and politician (1774 -1847)

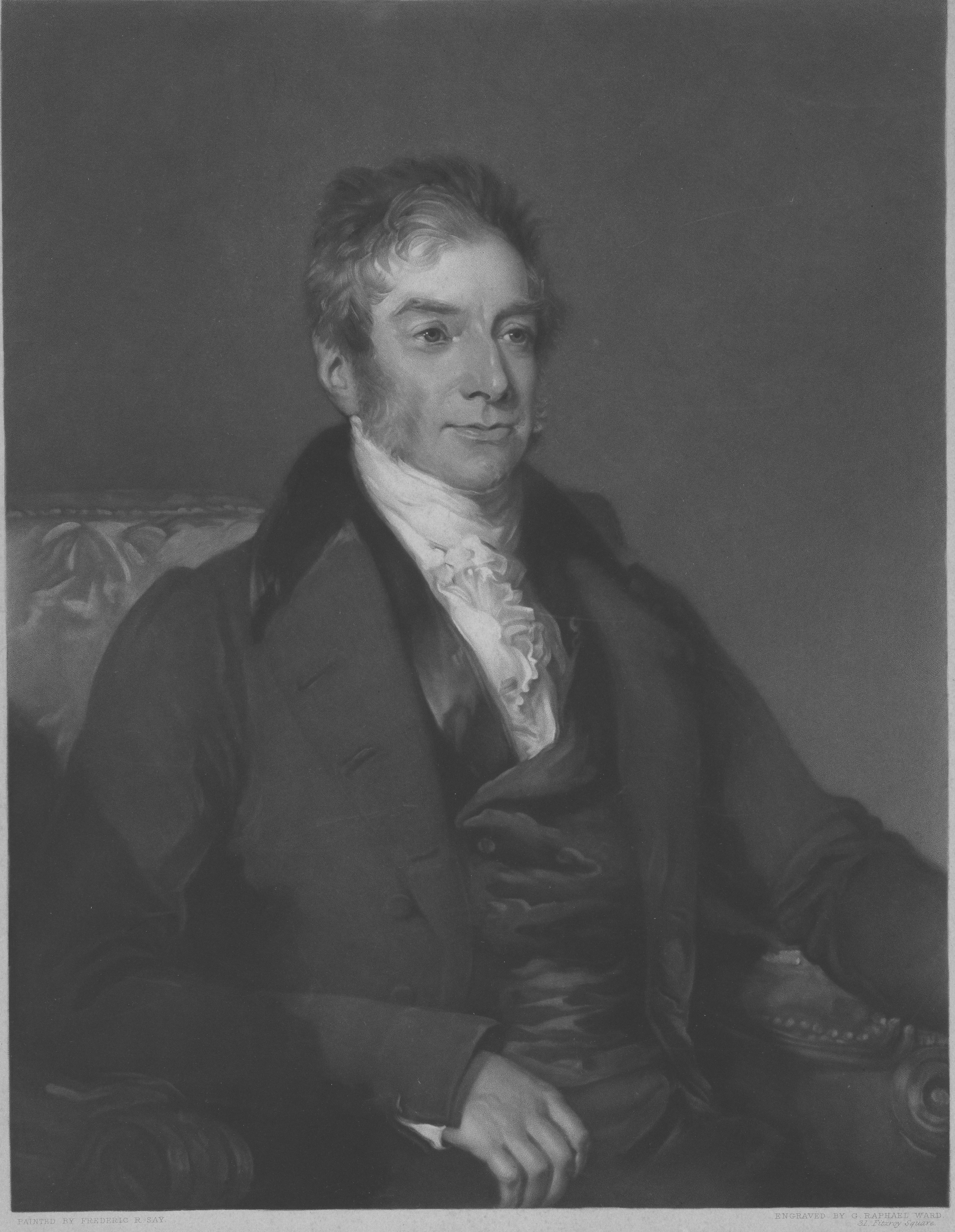
Mezzotint after Frederick Richard Say

William Astell (13 October 1774 – 7 March 1847) was a Member of Parliament and eminent director of the East India Company.

Astell was the second son of Godfrey Thornton of Moggerhanger House, Bedfordshire, a director of the Bank of England. He assumed the name of Astell instead of Thornton in 1807 on succeeding to the Everton estate in Bedfordshire of his great-uncle, Richard Astell.

He was elected a member of the court of directors of the East India Company in 1800, and in the same year took his seat in the House of Commons as conservative member for Bridgwater, which borough he represented during six successive parliaments. He subsequently sat for the county of Bedfordshire until the day of his death.

Being a director of the East India Company for the unprecedented period of forty-seven years, he filled the offices of chairman and deputy-chairman several times, and was actively engaged in the discussion and settlement of most of the many important questions bearing upon Indian administration which arose during that lengthened period. He was chairman of the court at the commencement of the negotiations between that body and the government which preceded the enactment of the East India Company's Charter Act 1833. Although at first opposed to the abolition of the monopoly which the company enjoyed in respect of its trade with China, Astell eventually acquiesced in the settlement of the question made by Earl Grey's government. As chairman again in 1844 he took a leading part in the recall of Lord Ellenborough, whose policy as governor-general he considered to be highly detrimental to the good government of that country. He was averse to annexation, unless clearly required for the safety of the British possessions, and was a staunch advocate of the policy of respecting the religious feelings of the natives of India.

Astell was a deputy-lieutenant of the county of Bedford, lieutenant-colonel of the Bedfordshire militia, and colonel of the Royal East India Volunteers. He was also chairman of the Russia Company and of the Great Northern Railway, besides filling other important offices in the city of London. He was the first member drawn from the East India Company to become a Trustee of Morden College.

He married Sarah, the daughter of John Harvey of Ickwellbury, Bedfordshire and Finningley Park, Yorkshire, with whom he had four sons and four daughters. He was succeeded in turn by his eldest son Richard William Astell (1804–1864), a lieutenant-colonel in the Grenadiers, and his second son, John Harvey Astell, MP (1806–1887).

Parliament of the United Kingdom
Preceded by Vere Poulett; John Langstone	Member of Parliament for Bridgwater; 1807–1832; With: George Pocock 1807–20; Charles Kemeys Kemeys Tynte 1820–32	Succeeded by William Tayleur; Charles Kemeys Kemeys Tynte
Preceded by Lord Charles Russell; Viscount Alford	Member of Parliament for Bedfordshire; 1841–1847; With: Viscount Alford	Succeeded by Lord Charles Russell; Viscount Alford
