= 1872 Bedfordshire by-election =

UK Parliamentary by-election

The 1872 Bedfordshire by-election was fought on 27 June 1872. The by-election was fought due to the Succession to a peerage of the incumbent MP of the Liberal Party, Francis Russell. It was won by the Liberal candidate Francis Bassett.
