= William Stuart (1798–1874) =

British politician (1798–1874)

Member of Parliament for Bedfordshire
- In office 1830-1831; 1832-1835

Member of Parliament for Armagh City
- In office 1820-1826

Personal details
- Born: 31 October 1798
- Died: 7 July 1874 (aged 75)
- Party: Tory
- Spouse(s): Henrietta Pole (d. 1853); Georgiana Walker
- Children: 4, including William
- Parent: William Stuart (father)
- Relatives: Henry Stuart (brother); John Stuart (grandfather); Thomas Penn (grandfather)
- Education: St John's College, Cambridge

Sir William Stuart (31 October 1798 – 7 July 1874), was a British Tory politician.

== Biography ==
Stuart was the son of the Most Reverend William Stuart, Archbishop of Armagh, fourth son of Prime Minister John Stuart, 3rd Earl of Bute. His mother was Sophia Margaret Juliana, daughter of Thomas Penn, of Stoke Poges, Buckinghamshire.

He was educated at St John's College, Cambridge.

Stuart was Member of Parliament for Armagh City from 1820 to 1826, and returned to Parliament as one of two representatives for Bedfordshire in 1830, a seat he held until 1831 and again from 1832 to 1835. Stuart was also a Deputy Lieutenant. He resided at Tempsford Hall, Bedfordshire, and Aldenham Abbey, Hertfordshire.

Stuart was a Freemason and the Grand Master of the Masonic Knights Templar from 1861 to 1872.

== Family ==
Stuart married firstly Henrietta Mariah Sarah, daughter of Admiral Sir Charles Pole Bt MP. They had four children:

- William (7 Mar 1825 - 21 Dec 1893) MP
- Mary Pole Stuart (1823 - 25 Jan 1852), who married as is his first wife, Jonathan Rashleigh. They had two sons and three daughters.
- Louisa Pole Stuart (d. 7 January 1858), who married, as his first wife, Rev. Oliver Matthew Ridley, grandson of Sir Matthew White Ridley, 2nd Baronet. They had three sons, and two daughters.
- Charles Pole Stuart (7 May 1826 - 26 Aug 1896), who married Anne Smyth, a second great-granddaughter of the Ven. James Smyth, Archdeacon of Meath, and maternal granddaughter of the Rt. Rev. Bishop Nathaniel Alexander. They had three sons, and two daughters.

After her death in 1853 he married secondly Georgiana, daughter of General Frederick Nathaniel Walker, in 1854. They had no children. Stuart died in July 1874, aged 75.

Parliament of the United Kingdom
Preceded by John Leslie Foster	Member of Parliament for Armagh City; 1820–1826	Succeeded by Henry Goulburn
Preceded by The Marquess of Tavistock; Thomas Potter MacQueen	Member of Parliament for Bedfordshire; 1830–1831; With: The Marquess of Tavistock	Succeeded by The Marquess of Tavistock; Sir Peter Payne
Preceded by The Marquess of Tavistock; Sir Peter Payne	Member of Parliament for Bedfordshire; 1832–1835; With: Lord Charles Russell	Succeeded by Lord Charles Russell; Viscount Alford
