= John Egerton, Viscount Alford =

British politician

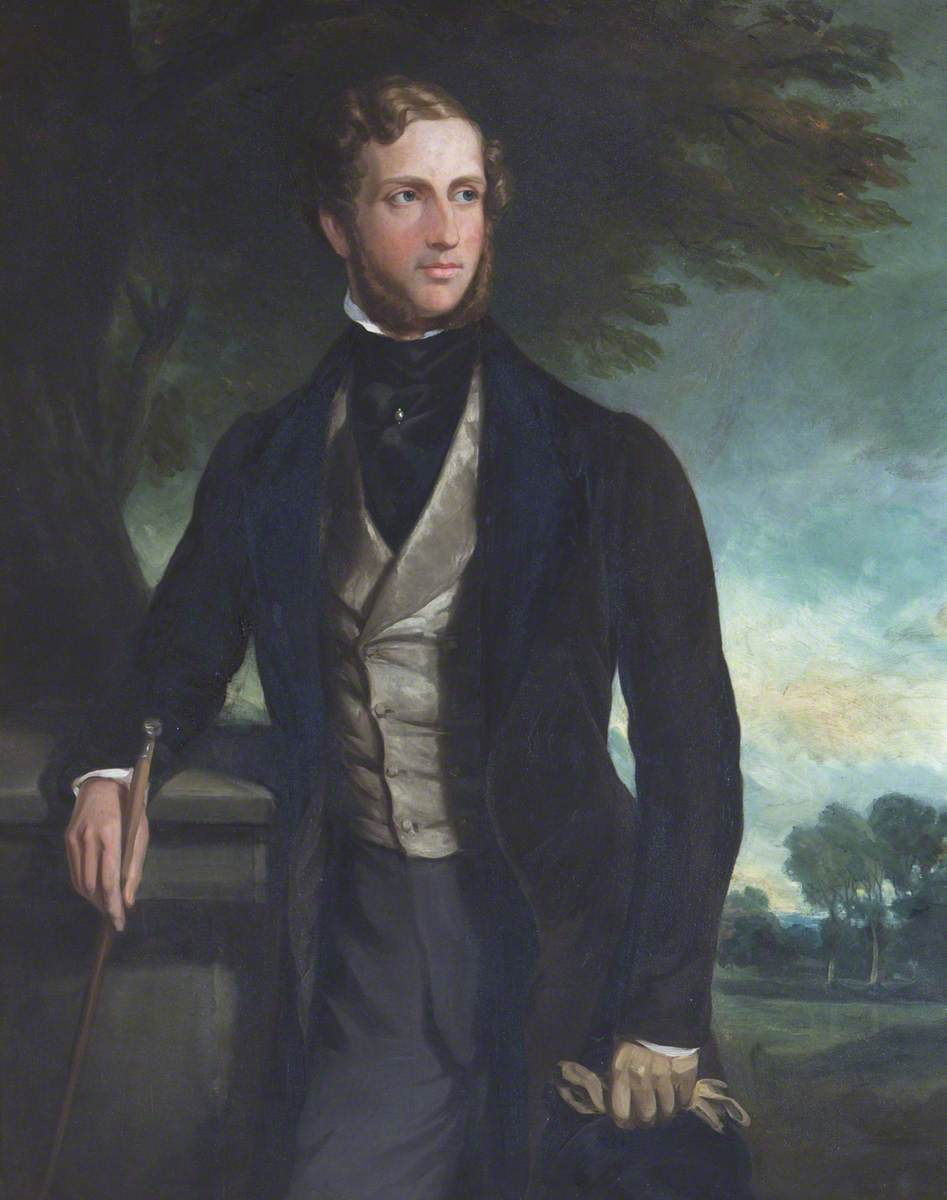
- Portrait of John Egerton, Viscount Alford by Francis Grant.

Member of Parliament for Bedfordshire
- In office 1835–1851

Personal details
- Born: Hon. John Hume Cust; 15 October 1812 Mayfair, London, England
- Died: 3 January 1851 (aged 38) Ashridge, Hertfordshire, England
- Party: Tory
- Spouse: Lady Marian Compton (m. 1841)
- Children: 2+, including Adelbert
- Parent: John Cust (father)
- Relatives: Egerton family Charles Cust (brother); Abraham Hume (grandfather)
- Education: Magdalene College, Cambridge

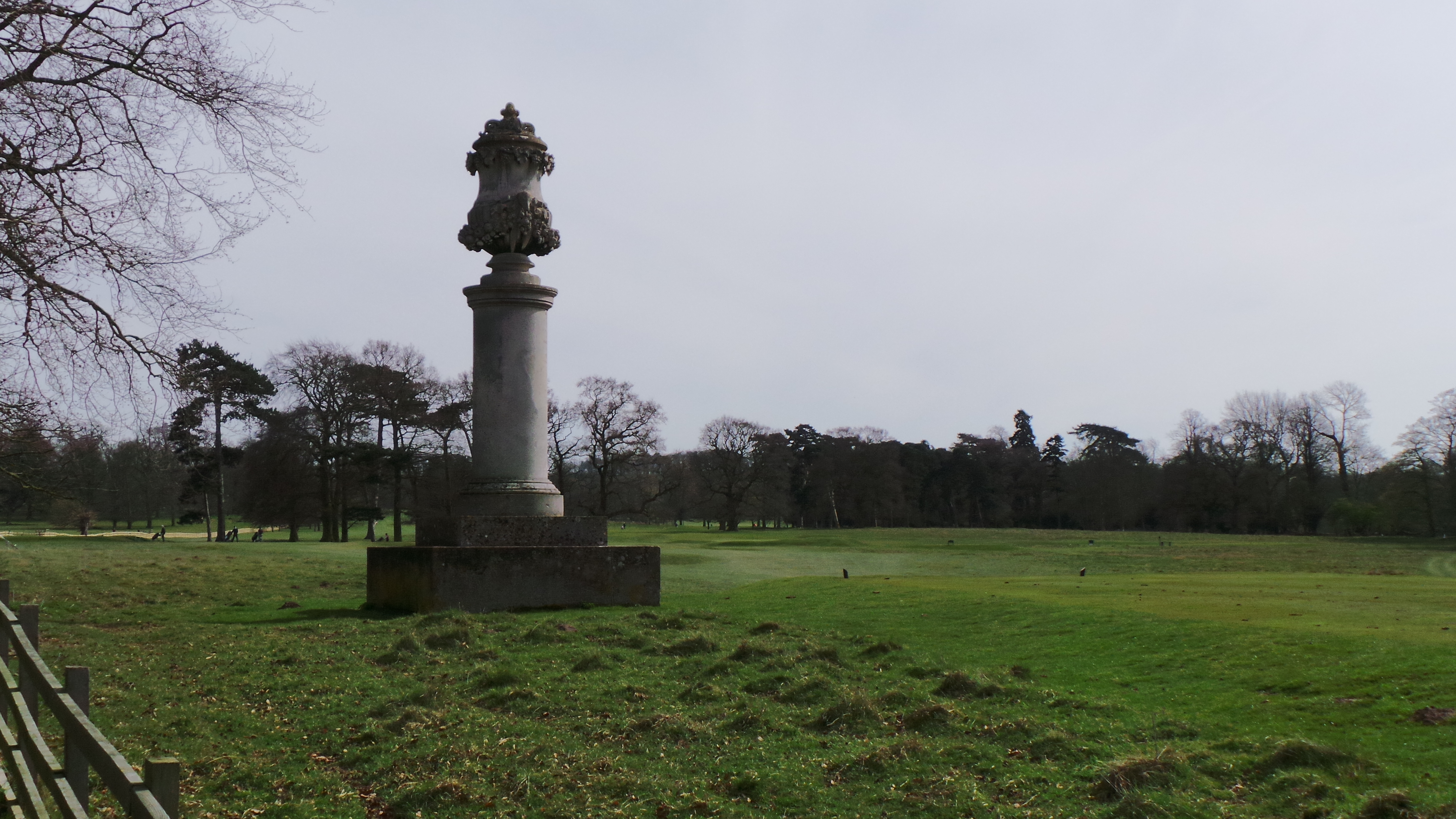
Monument to Viscount Alford erected by his father in the grounds of Belton House, Lincolnshire.

John Hume Egerton, Viscount Alford (born Cust; 15 October 1812 – 3 January 1851) was an English Tory Member of Parliament and landowner from the Egerton family.

== Early life ==
Alford was born at Hill Street at Berkeley Square, Mayfair, the eldest son of John Cust, 2nd Baron Brownlow by his first wife, Sophia Hume. His mother was the daughter of Sir Abraham Hume, 2nd Baronet and Lady Amelia Egerton, great-granddaughter of John Egerton, 3rd Earl of Bridgewater. He gained the courtesy title of Viscount Alford on his father being created Earl Brownlow in 1815. Alford was educated at Eton and Magdalene College, Cambridge.

== Career ==
In 1835, he was elected to the House of Commons for Bedfordshire, a seat he held until his death in 1851. He was strong supporter of Sir Robert Peel, until the repeal of the Corn Laws in 1846.

In 1849, two years before his death, Alford assumed by Royal licence the surname of Egerton in lieu of his patronymic, on succeeding to the huge Bridgwater estates through his mother. According to his obituary, Lord Alford "displayed the warmest regard for the welfare of his tenantry, and expended a considerable sum in providing schools for the education of the children of the poorer classes, and the needy have lost a liberal benefactor."

He joined the Canterbury Association on 17 June 1848 and remained a member until his death.

He was colonel of the North Lincoln Militia.

== Personal life ==
Lord Alford married Lady Marianne Margaret Compton, daughter of Spencer Compton, 2nd Marquess of Northampton, in 1841. They had two sons:

- John William Spencer Brownlow Egerton-Cust (1842–1867), died unmarried
- Adelbert Wellington Brownlow Cust, 3rd Earl Brownlow (1844–1921)

On one of his estates, he repaired Myddle Castle ruins in Shropshire in 1849, inscribing his name into a block in the castle's wall.

He fell ill in 1849 and spent the winter of 1850 in Egypt, hoping the climate would benefit his health. He returned to England in the summer, with no improvement. He died in January 1851 at his seat at Ashridge Park, aged only 38. His father-in-law the Marquess of Northampton, brother-in-law Earl Compton, and other family members had gathered at Ashridge when he died.

His eldest son, John, succeeded his grandfather in the earldom of Brownlow in 1853, but died in Italy, aged 24. His second son, Adelbert Wellington Brownlow Cust, succeeded his brother as 3rd Earl Brownlow and later became a government minister.

== See also ==
- Duke of Bridgewater
- Earl Brownlow

Parliament of the United Kingdom
Preceded by Lord Charles Russell; William Stuart	Member of Parliament for Bedfordshire; 1835–1851; With: Lord Charles Russell 1835–1841, 1847; William Thornton Astell 1841–1847; Francis Russell 1847–1851	Succeeded by Francis Russell; Richard Thomas Gilpin
