= Thomas Barnard (MP) =

Thomas Barnard JP DL MP (1830–1909) was a Whig member of parliament for Bedford.

== Biography ==
Born in Bedford on 21 March 1830, the second son of Thomas Barnard of Thomas Barnard & Co Bank, Thomas Barnard was educated at Bedford School. He became head of the banking house as well an associate of Samuel Whitbread, and was elected, with Whitbread, as a Whig member of parliament (MP) for Bedford at the General Election of 27 March 1857. He subsequently lost his seat at the General Election of 23 April 1859. He was Deputy Lieutenant of Bedfordshire between 1862 and 1909.

Thomas Barnard died at Cople House on 31 March 1909, at the age of 79.

Parliament of the United Kingdom
| Preceded by William Stuart | Member of Parliament for Bedford; 1857–1859 | Succeeded by William Stuart |
