= Francis Russell, 9th Duke of Bedford =

English politician and agriculturalist (1819–1891)

His Grace The Duke of Bedford KG
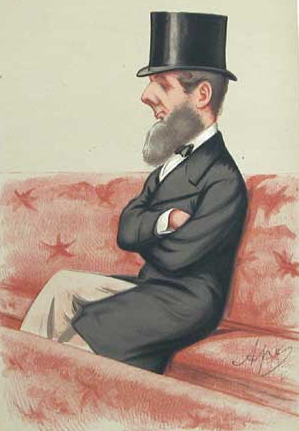
- The Duke of Bedford in the House of Lords, by Carlo Pellegrini, 1874
- Tenure: 27 May 1872 – 14 January 1891
- Successor: George Russell, 10th Duke of Bedford
- Other titles: 9th Marquess of Tavistock; 13th Earl of Bedford; 13th Baron Russell; 11th Baron Russell of Thornhaugh; 9th Baron Howland
- Born: 16 October 1819; Mayfair, London, England
- Died: 14 January 1891 (aged 71); Belgravia, London, England
- Spouse: Elizabeth Sackville-West (m. 1844)
- Issue: George Russell, 10th Duke of Bedford; Lady Ella Russell; Lady Ermyntrude Russell; Herbrand Russell, 11th Duke of Bedford
- Parents: Lord George William Russell; Elizabeth Anne Rawdon

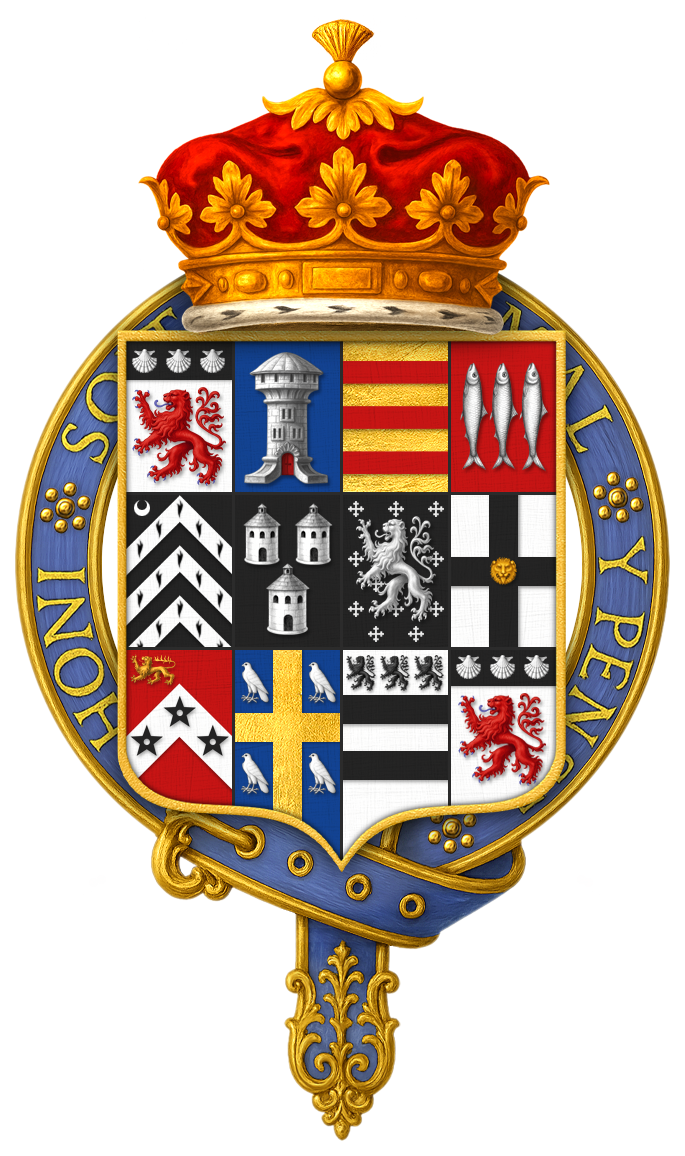
Quartered arms of Francis Russell, 9th Duke of Bedford, KG

Francis Charles Hastings Russell, 9th Duke of Bedford (16 October 1819 – 14 January 1891) was an English politician and agriculturalist.

== Life ==
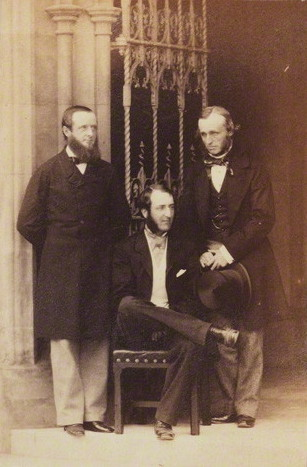
Francis Charles Hastings Russell, 9th Duke of Bedford; Sir Robert Nigel Fitzhardinge Kingscote; George William John Repton by Camille Silvy

Known as Hastings, the 9th Duke was born in Curzon Street, London, the son of Major-General Lord George William Russell and Lady William Russell, and the grandson of John Russell, 6th Duke of Bedford. He was commissioned into the Scots Fusilier Guards in 1838, retiring in 1844. He was Liberal Member of Parliament for Bedfordshire from 1847 until 1872, when he succeeded to the dukedom on the death of his cousin William Russell, 8th Duke of Bedford, and took his place in the House of Lords. In 1886, he broke with the party leadership of William Ewart Gladstone over the First Irish Home Rule Bill and became a Unionist.

He took an active interest in agriculture and experimentation on his Woburn Abbey estate and was President of the Royal Agricultural Society in 1880. On 1 December 1880, he was made a Knight of the Garter. From 1884 until his death he was Lord Lieutenant of Huntingdonshire.

He died in 1891, aged 71 at 81 Eaton Square, London, by shooting himself as a result of insanity, while suffering from pneumonia. After being cremated at Woking Crematorium, his ashes were buried at the Bedford Chapel of St. Michael's Church in Chenies, Buckinghamshire.

He owned 86,000 acres, mostly in Bedfordshire, Devon and Cambridge.

== Marriage and issue ==
He married Lady Elizabeth Sackville-West, daughter of George Sackville-West, 5th Earl De La Warr, in Buckhurst Park on 18 January 1844. They had four children:

- George William Francis Sackville Russell, 10th Duke of Bedford (1852–1893)
- Lady Ella Monica Sackville Russell (1854–1936), died unmarried.
- Lady Ermyntrude Sackville Russell (1856–1927), married Edward Malet, 4th Bt.
- Herbrand Arthur Russell, 11th Duke of Bedford (1858–1940)

== Bibliography ==
- Lloyd, E. M. & Seccombe, T. "Russell, Lord George William (1790–1846)", rev. James Falkner, Oxford Dictionary of National Biography, Oxford University Press, 2004

Parliament of the United Kingdom
Preceded by Viscount Alford; Lord Charles Russell	Member of Parliament for Bedfordshire; 1847–1872; With: Viscount Alford 1847–1851; Sir Richard Gilpin, Bt 1851–1872	Succeeded by Sir Richard Gilpin, Bt; Francis Bassett
Honorary titles
Preceded by The Earl of Sandwich	Lord Lieutenant of Huntingdonshire; 1884–1891	Succeeded by The Earl of Sandwich
Peerage of England
Preceded by William Russell	Duke of Bedford; 1872–1891	Succeeded by George Russell
