= 1875 Bedfordshire by-election =

UK Parliamentary by-election

The 1875 Bedfordshire by-election was fought on 28 April 1875. The by-election was fought due to the resignation of the incumbent Liberal MP, Francis Bassett. It was won by the Liberal candidate Marquess of Tavistock, who was unopposed.
