= Gerard Braybrooke II =

English politician

Sir Gerard Braybrooke (before 1354 – 1429), of Colmworth, Bedfordshire, Horsenden, Buckinghamshire and Danbury, Essex, was an English politician.

He was MP for Bedfordshire in February 1388 and 1399 and for Essex in 1402 and 1417.
