= Francis Russell, 7th Duke of Bedford =

British peer and Whig politician (1788-1861)

His Grace The Duke of Bedford KG
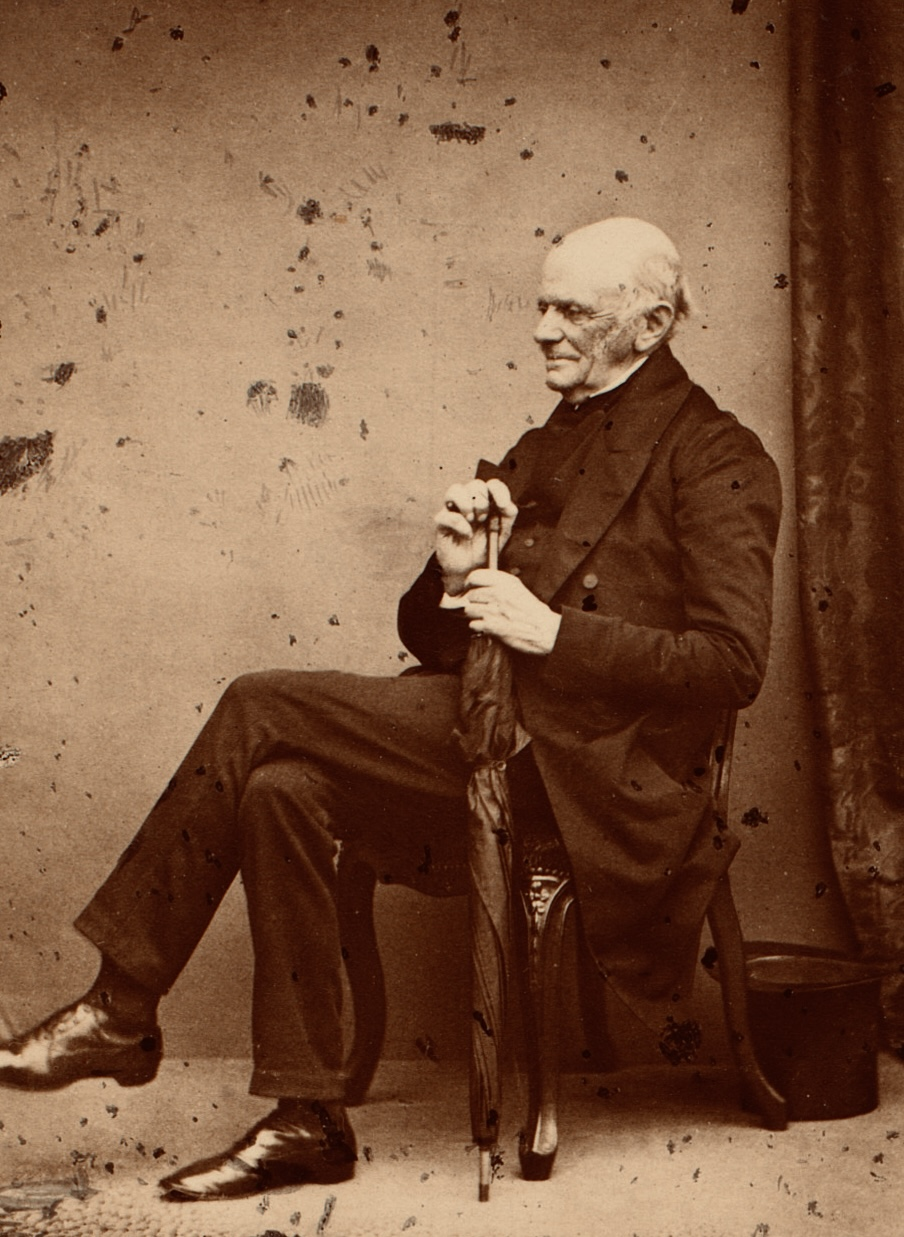
- The Duke of Bedford, c. 1860
- Tenure: 20 October 1839 – 14 May 1861
- Predecessor: John Russell
- Successor: William Russell
- Other titles: 7th Marquess of Tavistock; 11th Earl of Bedford; 11th Baron Russell; 9th Baron Russell of Thornhaugh; 7th Baron Howland
- Born: 13 May 1788
- Died: 14 May 1861 (aged 73)
- Spouse: Lady Anna Maria Stanhope (m. 1808; died 1857)
- Issue: William Russell, 8th Duke of Bedford
- Parents: John Russell, 6th Duke of Bedford; Georgiana Byng

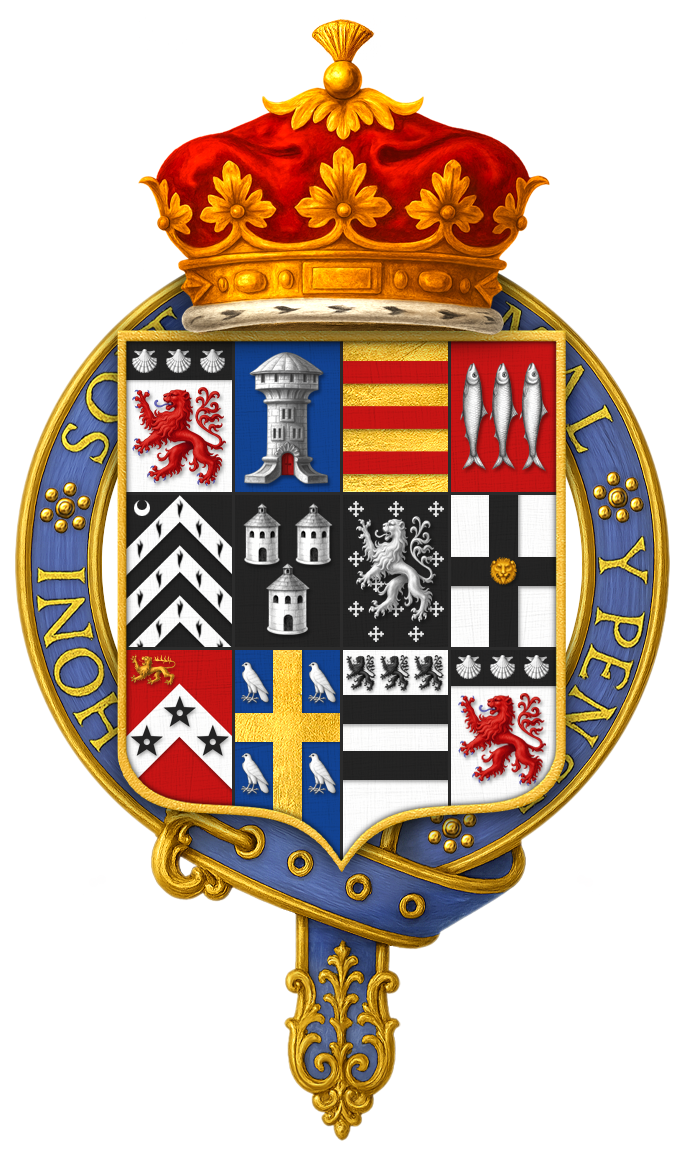
Quartered arms of Francis Russell, 7th Duke of Bedford, KG, PC

Francis Russell, 7th Duke of Bedford (13 May 1788 – 14 May 1861), styled Marquess of Tavistock from 1802 to 1839, was a British peer and Whig politician.

== Background and education ==
He was the son of John Russell, 6th Duke of Bedford, and his first wife, the Hon. Georgiana Byng, second daughter of George Byng, 4th Viscount Torrington. Russell was educated at Westminster School and graduated from Trinity College, Cambridge in 1808 as a Master of Arts. He succeeded his father as duke in 1839.

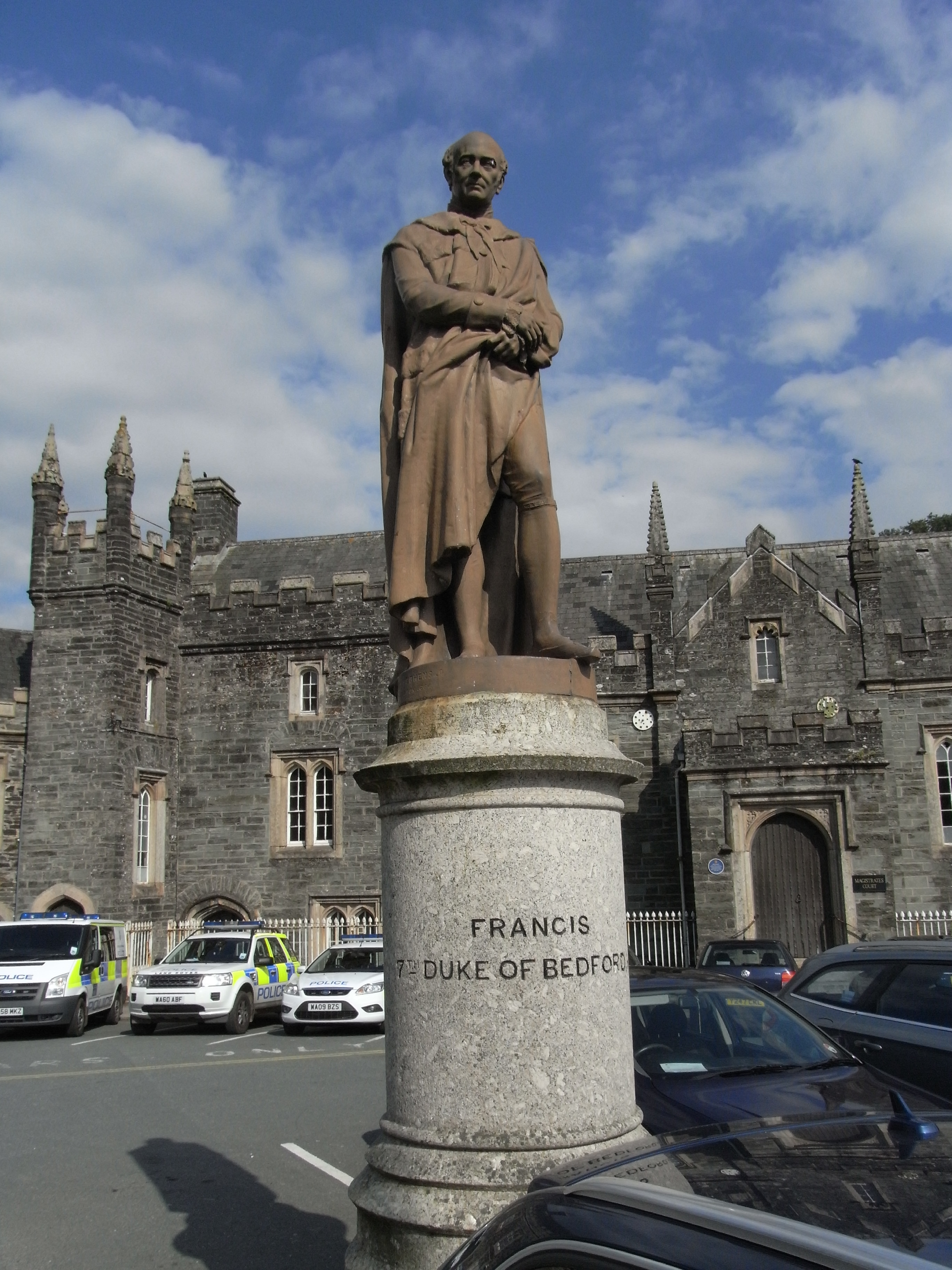
Statue of Francis, 7th Duke of Bedford by Edward Bowring Stephens, before the Magistrate's Court, Tavistock. Erected by public subscription, 1864

== Career ==
As Marquess of Tavistock he was appointed joint Lieutenant-Colonel (with Samuel Whitbread) of the 1st Bedfordshire Local Militia in 1808.

He entered the British House of Commons in 1809, sitting as a Member of Parliament for Peterborough for the next three years. Subsequently, Russell represented Bedfordshire until 1832. In the following year, he was summoned to the House of Lords in his father's junior title Baron Howland of Streatham by a writ of acceleration. Russell was sworn into the Privy Council on 6 July 1846 and was invested as a Knight of the Order of the Garter on 26 March 1847. He was made a Special Deputy Warden of the Stannaries in 1852 and was appointed Lord Lieutenant of Bedfordshire in 1859, a post he held until his death in 1861.

== Family ==
Russell was the elder brother of John Russell, 1st Earl Russell, who was twice Prime Minister of Great Britain.

On 8 August 1808, he married Lady Anna Stanhope, daughter of Charles Stanhope, 3rd Earl of Harrington, and had a son by her.

Russell died in 1861, aged 73, and was buried on 22 May at the ‘Bedford Chapel’ of St. Michael's Church at Chenies, Buckinghamshire. He was succeeded in his titles by his only son William.

Parliament of the United Kingdom
Preceded by French Laurence; William Elliot	Member of Parliament for Peterborough; 1809 – 1812; With: William Elliot	Succeeded by William Elliot; George Ponsonby
Preceded by Francis Pym; Hon. Richard FitzPatrick	Member of Parliament for Bedfordshire; 1812 – 1832; With: Francis Pym 1812–1818, 1820–1826; Sir John Osborn, Bt 1818–1820; Thomas Potter MacQueen 1826–1830; William Stuart 1830–1831; Sir Peter Payne 1831–1832	Succeeded by Lord Charles Russell; William Stuart
Honorary titles
Preceded by The Earl de Grey	Lord Lieutenant of Bedfordshire; 1859–1861	Succeeded by The Earl Cowper
Peerage of England
Preceded by John Russell	Duke of Bedford; 1839–1861	Succeeded by William Russell
Preceded by John Russell	Baron Howland of Streatham (writ of acceleration); 1833–1861	Succeeded by William Russell
