= William Butler =

William Butler may refer to:

== Actors ==
- William Butler (actor), American actor, played in Leatherface: The Texas Chainsaw Massacre III
- William J. Butler (1860–1927), Irish silent film actor

== Law ==
- William Allen Butler (1825–1902), American lawyer and writer of poetical satires
- William E. Butler (born 1939), American-British legal scholar
- William Butler (judge) (1822–1909), U.S. federal judge

== Military ==
- William Butler (colonel) (died 1789), American Revolutionary War soldier from Pennsylvania, one of five Butler brothers in the war
- William Butler (1759–1821), American Revolutionary War soldier, 1790s militia general, U.S. representative from South Carolina
- William Butler (militiaman) (1759–1818), U.S. militia captain killed in the Creek War, namesake of Butler County, Alabama
- William O. Butler (1791–1880), U.S. soldier in the War of 1812 and Mexican–American War, 1848 Democratic vice-presidential candidate
- Sir William Butler (British Army officer) (1838–1910), British Army lieutenant general and adventurer
- William Boynton Butler (1894–1972), British Army soldier awarded a Victoria Cross
- William Ormond Butler (1895–1962), United States Army Air Force major general

== Music ==
- Will Butler (William Pierce Butler, born 1982), American musician, member of Arcade Fire
- William Butler (sound designer), British/Canadian musician, sound designer and recording engineer
- Billy Butler (guitarist) (William Butler Jr., 1925–1991), American soul jazz guitarist
- Billy Butler (singer) (William E. Butler, 1945–2015), American soul singer

== Politics ==
- William Butler (fl. 1386–1393), member of parliament (MP) for Nottingham
- William Butler (1544–1577), MP for Queenborough
- William Boteler (died 1602) (1540–1602), or Butler, MP for Lyme Regis and Bedford
- William Butler (1790–1850), U.S. representative from South Carolina
- William Butler (Illinois politician) (fl. 1859–1863), Illinois State Treasurer
- William M. Butler (1861–1937), lawyer and legislator for the state of Massachusetts, United States Senator
- William Henry Butler (1790–1865), English wine merchant and mayor of Oxford
- William Butler (New Zealand politician) (1841–1875), New Zealand politician

== Religion ==
- William Butler (missionary) (1818–1899), Irish-born U.S. Methodist Episcopal missionary to Mexico and India
- William John Butler (1818–1894), High Church Anglican priest
- William Butler (canon) (died 1519), canon of Windsor

== Sports ==
- William C. Butler (1844–1914), played football for England
- William Butler (cricketer) (1871–1953), New Zealand first-class cricketer, later international Test cricket umpire
- William Butler (footballer) (1872–1953), Druids F.C. and Wales international footballer
- William Butler (boxer) (1916–1996), boxer
- Bill Butler (linebacker) (William Marshall Butler, born 1947), American football linebacker
- Bill Butler (running back) (William Edward Butler, 1950–2018), American football running back
- Bill Butler (safety) (William R. Butler, 1937–2025), American football safety in the United States and Canada
- Bill Butler (outfielder) (William J. Butler, 1861–1895), Major League Baseball outfielder
- Bill Butler (pitcher) (William Franklin Butler, born 1947), Major League Baseball pitcher
- Billy Butler (footballer) (William Butler, 1900–1966), English footballer, scorer for Bolton Wanderers in the 1929 FA Cup Final
- Will Butler (rugby union) (William John Butler, born 1998), English rugby union player

== Others ==
- William Butler (alchemist) (c. 1534–1617), Irish alchemist
- William Butler (physician) (1535–1617), Fellow of Clare College, Cambridge
- William Archer Butler (1814–1848), Irish historian of philosophy
- W. Corly Butler (1869–1955), Methodist minister in Australia
- William Edward Butler (1790–1882), West Tennessee settler
- William F. Butler, African American leader after the American Civil War
- William James Butler (1858–1932), New Zealand sawmiller and timber merchant
- William Butler (brewer), whose company was merged into Mitchells & Butlers
- William Butler (author), author of the novel The Butterfly Revolution
- Bill Butler (cinematographer) (Wilmer Cable Butler, 1921–2023), American cinematographer
- Billy Butler (DJ) (William George Butler, born 1942), English DJ from Liverpool

== See also ==
- William Butler Yeats, Irish poet
- Bill Butler (disambiguation)
- Billy Butler (disambiguation)
- William Boteler (disambiguation), spellings often used interchangeably
