= Bill Butler =

Bill Butler may refer to:

== Sports ==
=== Gridiron football ===
- Bill Butler (linebacker) (born 1947), American football linebacker
- Bill Butler (running back) (1950–2018), American football running back
- Bill Butler (safety) (1937–2025), American football safety in the United States and Canada

=== Other sports ===
- Bill Butler (Australian footballer) (1920–1986), Australian rules footballer for St Kilda
- Bill Butler (outfielder) (1861–1895), Major League Baseball outfielder
- Bill Butler (pitcher) (born 1947), Major League Baseball pitcher
- Bill Butler (skater), roller skater and choreographer credited with inventing jam skating

== Others ==
- Bill Butler (cinematographer) (1921–2023), American cinematographer
- Bill Butler (film editor) (1933–2017), English film editor
- Bill Butler (politician) (born 1956), Scottish Labour Party politician

== See also ==
- Billy Butler (disambiguation)
- William Butler (disambiguation)
