= Samuel Charles Whitbread =

British politician

The Right Honourable Samuel Charles Whitbread JP DL FRS
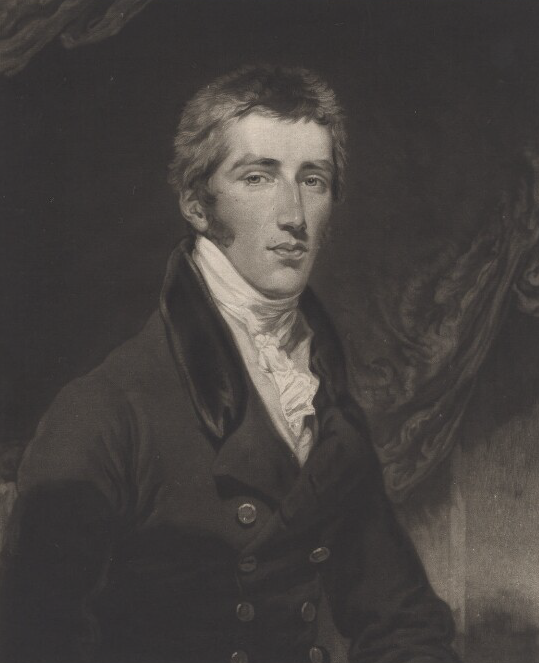
- Born: 16 February 1796; London, England
- Died: 27 May 1879 (aged 83)
- Education: St John's College, Cambridge
- Occupations: Businessman, politician, and amateur meteorologist and astronomer
- Children: 3 daughters, 2 sons, including Samuel Whitbread (1830–1915)
- Parents: Samuel Whitbread (1764–1815); Lady Elizabeth Grey (1765–1846)

Samuel Charles Whitbread (16 February 1796 – 27 May 1879) was a British Member of Parliament, member of the Whitbread brewing family and founding president of the Royal Meteorological Society.

== Early life and education ==
Whitbread was the son of Samuel Whitbread and Lady Elizabeth Grey. Grey was the daughter of General Charles Grey, 1st Earl Grey and sister of Prime Minister Charles Grey. He was educated at Eton College and St John's College, Cambridge where he studied mathematics, moral philosophy and classics.

On 6 July 1815, Whitbread's father took his own life, whereupon his two sons, William Henry (then aged 20) and Samual Charles (19), inherited the family business and estates.

== Politics ==
As a Whig MP, he represented the constituency of Middlesex (1820–1830) and was High Sheriff of Bedfordshire in 1831. He made three major contributions to debates including to the Reform of Parliament debate, where he opposed the existence of rotten boroughs and the selling of seats in the House of Commons.

== Meteorology and astronomy ==
His interests were astronomy and meteorology. He founded, along with John Lee and James Glaisher, and served as president of the Royal Meteorological Society from 1850 to 1853. He remained a member of Council continuously until 18 June 1873, and served long stretches as vice-president. Following the death of Robert FitzRoy, Whitbread was involved in the search for a new Director of the Met Office. In June 1854 he was elected a Fellow of the Royal Society

He joined the Royal Astronomical Society on 12 January 1849, and served as its treasurer from 1857 to 1878, when ill health forced him to relinquish the position. According to Dreyer and Turner (1923) he was most excellent in this position, leveraging his experience from running the family business: "He was an absolute terror to defaulters in arrear with their contributions, and used to visit them personally and ask them to explain their conduct before he recommended the Council to expel them". He was a fellow of the RAS and regularly published in Monthly Notices.

In the early 1840, Whitbread built an observatory on his grounds, and with the help of his gardeners, made carefully astronomical and meteorological observations. In January 1873 he presented a set of observations to the Meteorological Office, founded 20 years before, entitled 'Fluctuations of barometer, Cardington Observatory, January 1, 1846, to December 31, 1870'. Today they are held in the National Meteorological Archive and include besides barometer readings made at 9.00am and 3.00pm each day, temperature, strength of the winds, and remarks on both meteorological and astronomical phenomena.

On 9 December 1815, months after his father's death, the principal gamekeeper Charles Dines at the family seat Southill Park was murdered by a poacher. Whitbread retained an interest in the welfare of Dines' family over many years. Three generations of distinguished meteorologists were descended from Dines including William Henry Dines and John Somers Dines.

== Family ==
Whitbread lived at the family seat Southill Park and in London. After his elder brother William Henry Whitbread died without heirs in 1867, Samuel Charles inherited the family firm and estates. He married the Hon. Julia Trevor (died 1858), daughter of Henry Trevor, 21st Baron Dacre, on 24 June 1824. After she passed in 1858, he married Lady Mary Stephenson Keppel, daughter of the fourth Earl of Albemarle. He died on 27 May 1879.

His eldest son was Samuel Whitbread. Their daughter Juliana married Thomas Coke, 2nd Earl of Leicester.

Parliament of the United Kingdom
Preceded by George Byng; William Mellish	Member of Parliament for Middlesex; 1820–1830; With: George Byng	Succeeded by George Byng; Joseph Hume
Honorary titles
Preceded by John Dawson	High Sheriff of Bedfordshire; 1831–1832	Succeeded by Thomas Potter Macqueen
