= Snagge =

Snagge is a surname. Notable people with this surname include:

- Arthur Lionel Snagge (1878–1955), British naval officer
- John Snagge (1904–1996), British newsreader
- Thomas Snagge (1536–1593), English MP
- Thomas Snagge (c.1564–1627), English MP
