= 1921 Bedford by-election =

UK parliamentary by-election

| ← 1918 | 23 April 1921 | 1922 → |
| Candidate | Kellaway | Riley |
| Party | Liberal | Labour |
| Popular vote | 14,397 | 9,731 |
| Percentage | 59.7% | 40.3% |
MP before election
Kellaway
Liberal
Subsequent MP
Wells
Unionist

The 1921 Bedford by-election was a parliamentary by-election held for the UK House of Commons constituency of Bedford on 23 April 1921.

== Vacancy ==
The by-election was caused by the appointment of the sitting Member of Parliament (MP) for Bedford, Frederick Kellaway, to the office of Postmaster General. Under the Parliamentary procedures of the day, he was obliged to resign his seat and fight a by-election.

== Candidates ==
Kellaway, who was originally a journalist by profession, had first been elected as Liberal MP for Bedford at the general election of December 1910, narrowly beating the sitting Unionist member, Walter Annis Attenborough. After 1916, Kellaway supported the Coalition government of David Lloyd George and held ministerial office at the Ministry of Munitions and as Secretary for Overseas Trade. At the 1918 general election he was awarded the Coalition coupon and easily held his seat in a straight fight with an Independent candidate. He was again described as a Coalition Liberal for the by-election and was supported by both local Liberals and Unionists.

He was opposed for Labour by Frederick Fox Riley, an assistant secretary of the Union of Post Office Workers. Riley stood for Parliament a number of times for Labour and was later MP for Stockton-on-Tees from 1929-31.

== Issues ==
Kellaway’s election address announced that he was a ruthless enemy of waste in all areas of public expenditure. In his own field, the General Post Office, he declared a policy of making the GPO self-sufficient. He was also pressed by electors on the expansion of telephone services to rural areas. Riley questioned the government’s policy towards Ireland, especially its repression of nationalist protest and called for a capital levy to help reduce the national debt. The coal dispute was also an issue which dominated debate.

In his letter of support for Kellaway the prime minister described the Coalition as an example of a government committed to all regardless of class, clearly making a contrast with the centre-right view of Labour as a socialist and sectarian party. Lloyd George also attacked Labour for fomenting industrial strife and so threatening national unity against the interests of working people. To emphasise this distinction, Kellaway told the electorate that the choice was between the red flag of revolution and the Union Jack.

Dame Margaret Lloyd George campaigned in the by-election on behalf of the Coalition. Permission was apparently given for schoolchildren to take time off lessons to cheer her and sing for her and to parade in several of the constituency’s villages. The Bedfordshire Education Committee felt obliged to set up an inquiry into how consent for this was granted.

== Result ==
In what was described as a high turn-out, particularly amongst women voters Kellaway retained his seat but by a reduced majority. The by-election turn-out was 73% as opposed to 45% at the general election. At the previous general election Kellaway had had a majority of 6,837 over an Independent candidate. His by-election majority over Labour was 4,666. Kellaway declared the result a triumph for Parliamentary government and against direct action, nationalization or other ‘foreign fads introduced into the country’. Riley said the heavy Labour poll was a victory in itself and looked forward to closer election results in the constituency in times to come.

Bedford by-election, 1921
| Party | | Candidate | Votes | % | ±% |
|---|---|---|---|---|---|
| C | Liberal | Frederick Kellaway | 14,397 | 59.7 | −13.0 |
| | Labour | Frederick Fox Riley | 9,731 | 40.3 | New |
| Majority | | | 4,666 | 19.4 | −26.0 |
| Turnout | | | 24,128 | | |
| | Liberal hold | | Swing | | |
C indicates candidate endorsed by the coalition government.

== See also ==
- List of United Kingdom by-elections
- United Kingdom by-election records
