= William Boteler (disambiguation) =

William Boteler was an English 17th-century politician.

William Boteler may also refer to:

- William Boteler (died 1602), MP for Lyme Regis and Bedford
- William Boteler (15th century MP) for Lancashire (UK Parliament constituency)
- William Boteler, 1st Baron Boteler of Werington (died c. 1328), Baron Boteler
- William Boteler, 1st Baron Boteler of Wem (died 1334), Baron Boteler
- William Boteler, 2nd Baron Boteler of Wem (died 1361), Baron Boteler
- William Boteler, 3rd Baron Boteler of Wem (died 1369), Baron Boteler
- William Boteler, 2nd Baron Boteler (died 1657), Baron Boteler

== See also ==
- William Butler (disambiguation), spellings often used interchangeably
