= Samuel Whitbread (1764–1815) =

English politician (1764–1815)

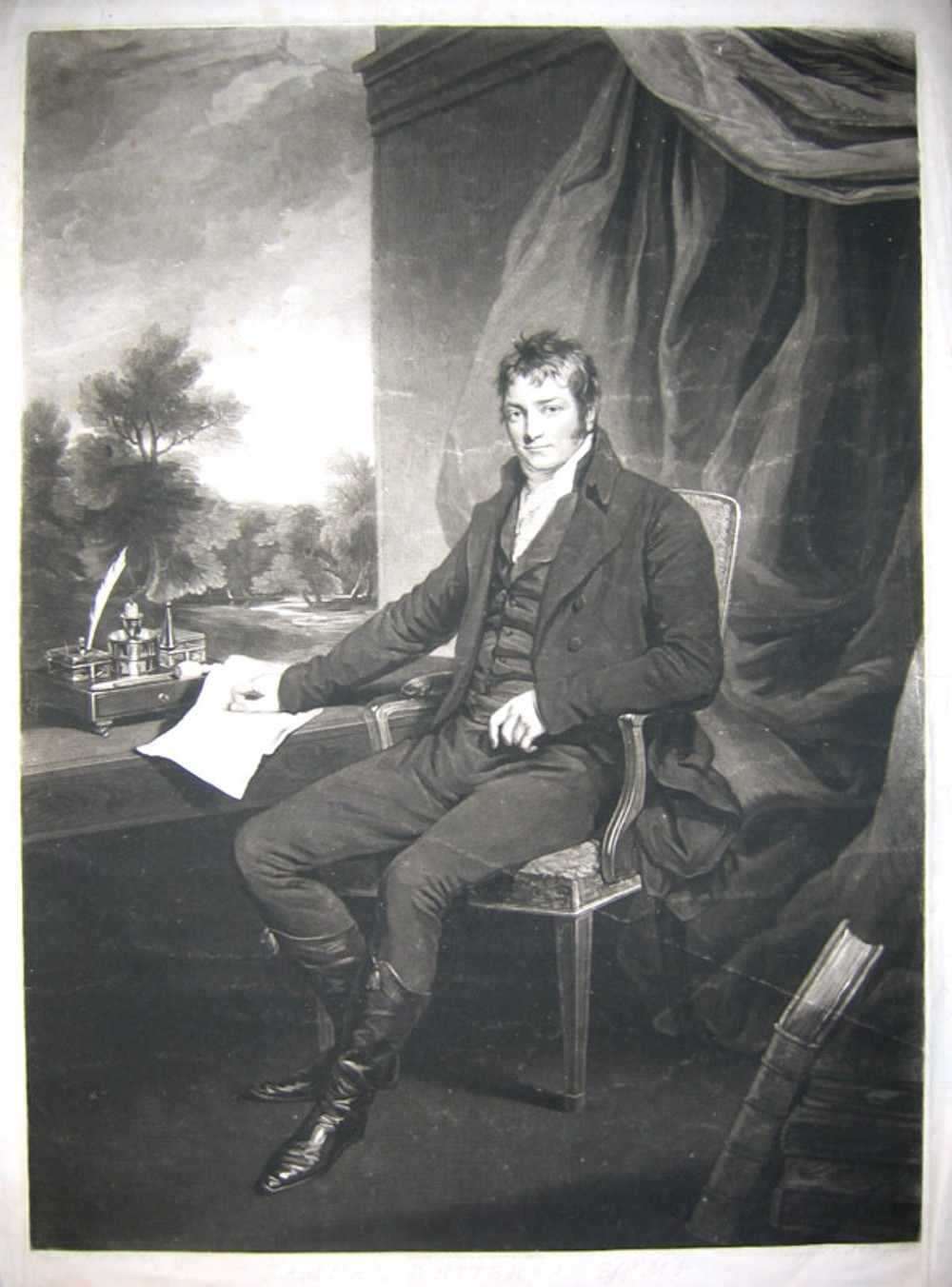
- Samuel Whitbread II by John Opie
- Born: 18 January 1764; Cardington, Bedfordshire, England
- Died: 6 July 1815 (aged 51); Mayfair, London, England
- Cause of death: suicide
- Education: Christ Church, Oxford; St John's College, Cambridge
- Occupation: Politician
- Spouse: Lady Elizabeth Grey (m. 1787)
- Children: William Henry Whitbread; Samuel Charles Whitbread
- Father: Samuel Whitbread

Samuel Whitbread (18 January 1764 – 6 July 1815) was a British politician. The heir of a wealthy brewer, he was a staunch Whig sitting in Parliament from 1790 to his death. Shortly after the Battle of Waterloo he died by suicide, having been very sympathetic to the defeated French emperor Napoleon.

== Early life ==
Whitbread was born on 18 January 1764 in Cardington, Bedfordshire, the son of the brewer Samuel Whitbread. He was educated at Eton College, Christ Church, Oxford, and St John's College, Cambridge, after which he embarked on a European "Grand Tour", visiting Denmark, Sweden, Russia, Poland, Prussia, France, and Italy. He returned to England in May 1786 and joined his father's successful brewing business.

== Member of Parliament ==
Whitbread was elected as a member of parliament (MP) for Bedford in 1790 (his father too had been MP) and he remained MP for twenty-three years. Whitbread was a reformer – a champion of religious and civil rights, for the abolition of slavery, a proponent of a national education system and, in 1795, sponsor of an unsuccessful bill for the introduction of minimum wages. He was a close friend and colleague of Charles James Fox. After Fox's death, Whitbread took over the leadership of the Whigs, and in 1805 led the campaign to have Viscount Melville impeached. In 1806 the House of Lords found Melville not guilty of all charges. In a shocking admission, Whitbread later confessed that he never suspected that Melville had enriched himself with public funds.

Whitbread took over the control of his father's estate, including Southill Park and the family brewing company following his father's death in 1796 and by the early 1810s, had introduced several new partners to bring investment to stabilise the finances of the company. These included his cousin Jacob Whitbread and John Martineau (who would subsequently merge his brewery with Whitbreads in 1812).

He raised a regiment of Volunteers in Bedford in 1803 and commanded it with the rank of Lieutenant-Colonel. In 1808 this became the 1st Bedfordshire Local Militia and he shared the command with Lt-Col the Marquess of Tavistock.

Whitbread admired Napoleon and his reforms in France and Europe. He hoped that many of Napoleon's reforms would be implemented in Britain. Throughout the Peninsular War he played down French defeats convinced that sooner or later Napoleon would triumph, and he did all he could to bring about a withdrawal of Britain from the continent. When Napoleon abdicated in 1814 he was devastated. Whitbread began to suffer from depression, and on the morning of 6 July 1815, he took his own life by cutting his throat with a razor.

The Hammonds comment that "Whitbread is a politician to whom history has done less than justice... His most notable quality was his vivid and energetic sympathy; he spent his life in hopeless battles and died by his own hand of public despair."

== Family ==
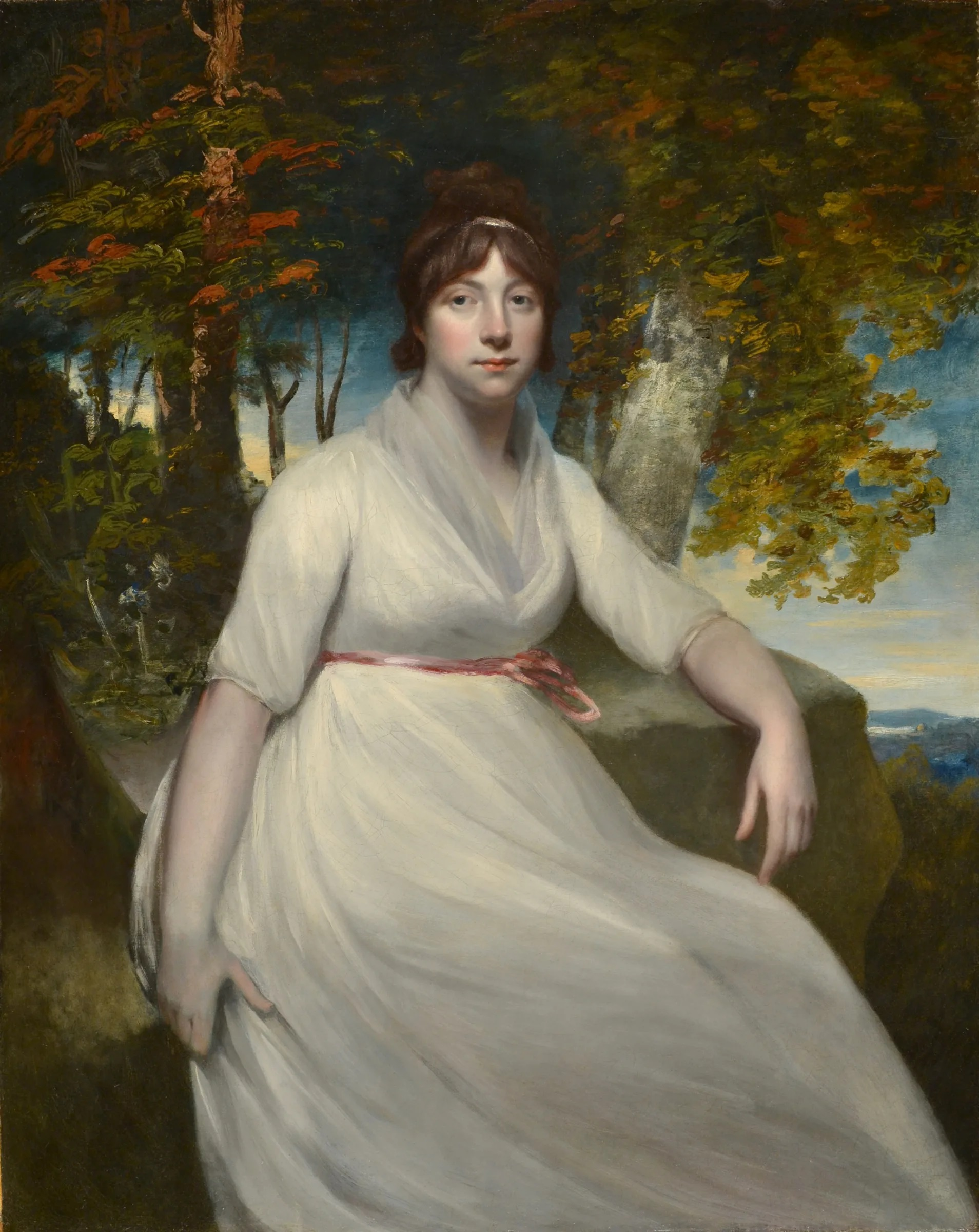
Lady Elizabeth Whitbread

Whitbread married Lady Elizabeth (1765–1846), the eldest daughter of the first Earl Grey on 26 December 1787. Their sons, William Henry Whitbread and Samuel Charles Whitbread, were also Members of Parliament.

Samuel Whitbread Academy in Central Bedfordshire, England, is named after him.

== Sources ==
- Lt-Col Sir John M. Burgoyne, Bart, Regimental Records of the Bedfordshire Militia 1759–1884, London: W.H. Allen, 1884.
- Hammond, J. L.; Hammond, Barbara (1912). The Village Labourer 1760-1832. Longman Green & Co.
- Ritchie, Berry (1992). An Uncommon Brewer, the Story of Whitbread. London: James & James. ISBN 978-0907383369..
- War Office, A List of the Officers of the Militia, the Gentlemen & Yeomanry Cavalry, and Volunteer Infantry of the United Kingdom, 11th Edn, London: War Office, 14 October 1805/Uckfield: Naval and Military Press, 2005, ISBN 978-1-84574-207-2.
- Charles Duke Yonge, The Life and Administration of Robert Banks, Second Earl of Liverpool, K. G., Late First Lord of the Treasury, Macmillan and Company, 1868.

=== External links ===
- Hansard 1803–2005: contributions in Parliament by Samuel Whitbread

=== Further reading ===
- Fulford, Roger. Samuel Whitbread, 1764-1815: A study in opposition, MacMillan, 1967. (ISBN B0000CNFHB)

Parliament of Great Britain
Preceded by Samuel Whitbread; William MacDowall Colhoun	Member of Parliament for Bedford; 1790–1800; With: William MacDowall Colhoun	Succeeded by Parliament of the United Kingdom
Parliament of the United Kingdom
Preceded by Parliament of Great Britain	Member of Parliament for Bedford; 1801–1815; With: William MacDowall Colhoun to 1802, William Lee Antonie 1802–1812, Lord George Russell 1812–1815	Succeeded by Lord George Russell; Hon. William Waldegrave
