= Thomas Snagge =

English politician and barrister (1536–1593)

Member of Parliament for Bedford
- In office 1589–1593

Speaker of the House of Commons
- In office 1589

Member of Parliament for Bedfordshire
- In office 1571; 1586–1587

Attorney-General for Ireland
- In office 1577-1580

Personal details
- Born: 1536 Letchworth, England
- Died: 1593 (aged 56–57)
- Spouse: Elizabeth Dickons
- Children: 7, including Thomas

Thomas Snagge (1536–1593) was a Member of Parliament, barrister and landowner who served as Speaker of the English House of Commons, Attorney General for Ireland and as Queen's Sergeant.

== Life ==
Snagge was born in 1536 in Letchworth. He was the son of Thomas Snagge, the prosperous lord of the manor of Marston Moretaine in Bedfordshire. He studied law at Gray's Inn, and after being called to the bar in 1554 practiced law in London.

Snagge was elected as a knight of the shire for Bedfordshire in 1571. He was chosen by Queen Elizabeth to be Attorney General for Ireland and held this appointment from 1577 to 1580. The Queen chose him because he had a reputation for efficiency, and "the public service had been not a little hindered through the default and insufficiency of m the [Irish] law officers" and "her Majesty thought that a person well-chosen in England might be sent over". Snagge as it turned out was not particularly well-chosen: he had not wanted the job and disliked living in Ireland and, according to a modern writer, his official correspondence is simply a long list of complaints. In particular, he complained of the inefficiency of the Master of the Rolls in Ireland, Nicholas White, and went so far as to make an official complaint against him to the Privy Council of England. In 1580 he was appointed a Serjeant-at-law (Ireland).

In 1586 Snagge was again returned as one of the members of parliament for Bedfordshire and in 1589 for the borough of Bedford. In 1589 he was elected as Speaker of the House of Commons and in 1590 was promoted to Queen's Serjeant. As well as owning several manors in Bedfordshire, his home seat was at Marston Moretaine.

Snagge died in 1593 and was entombed in St Mary's Church, Marston Moretaine, where an alabaster tomb carrying effigies of him and his wife survives. He had married Elizabeth, daughter and coheiress of Thomas Dickons of Marston Moretaine; they had five sons and two daughters. He was succeeded by his eldest son, Thomas, also a member of parliament (for Bedford in 1586).

Parliament of England
Preceded by John St John; Lewis Mordaunt	Member of Parliament for Bedfordshire; 1571; With: George Rotheram	Succeeded by George Rotheram; Sir Henry Cheyne
Preceded by George Rotheram; Nicholas Luke	Member of Parliament for Bedfordshire; 1586–1587; With: George Rotheram	Succeeded by Oliver St John; Edward Radclyffe
Preceded by William Boteler; Thomas Snagge jnr	Member of Parliament for Bedford; 1589–1593; With: John Pigott	Succeeded by John Pigott; Humphrey Winch
Legal offices
Preceded by John Bathe	Attorney-General for Ireland; 1577-1580	Succeeded by Christopher Flemyng, or Fleming
Political offices
Preceded by John Puckering	Speaker of the House of Commons; 1589	Succeeded by Edward Coke
