= Alfred Machin =

Alfred Machin may refer to:

- Alfred Machin (director) (1877–1929), French film director
- Alfred Machin (writer) (1888–1955), British writer
