= Thomas Snagge (c.1564–1627) =

Member of the Parliament of England

High Sheriff of Bedfordshire
- In office 1607-1608

Member of Parliament for Bedford
- In office 1586–1587

Personal details
- Born: c. 1564
- Died: 1627 (aged 62–63)
- Spouse: Miss Rotheram
- Children: 2
- Parent: Thomas Snagge (father)

Sir Thomas Snagge (c.1564 – 1627) of Marston Moretaine, Bedfordshire, was an English Member of Parliament and High Sheriff.

He was the eldest son of the lawyer and MP Thomas Snagge and studied law at Gray's Inn himself before succeeding his father to his Bedfordshire estates in 1593.

He sat in Parliament for a single term in 1586/87 as the MP for Bedford and was knighted by King James I in 1603. He served as a Justice of the Peace for the county and was picked High Sheriff of Bedfordshire for 1607-08.

He died in 1627 and was buried at Marston Moretaine. He had married a daughter of the Bedfordshire MP George Rotheram and left two sons, Thomas and Edward.

Parliament of England
Preceded by John Puckering; Nicholas Potts	Member of Parliament for Bedford; 1586–1587; With: William Boteler	Succeeded by John Pigott; Thomas Snagge
