= Billy Butler =

Billy Butler may refer to:

- Billy Butler (baseball) (born 1986), U.S. Major League Baseball player
- Billy Butler (DJ) (born 1942), English DJ from Liverpool
- Billy Butler (footballer) (1900–1966), English footballer, scorer for Bolton Wanderers in the 1929 FA Cup Final
- Billy Butler (guitarist) (1925–1991), U.S. soul jazz guitarist
- Billy Butler (singer) (1945–2015), U.S. soul singer

== See also ==
- Billie Butler, American politician
- Bill Butler (disambiguation)
- William Butler (disambiguation)
