= Moreteyne Manor =

Listed building in Bedfordshire, England

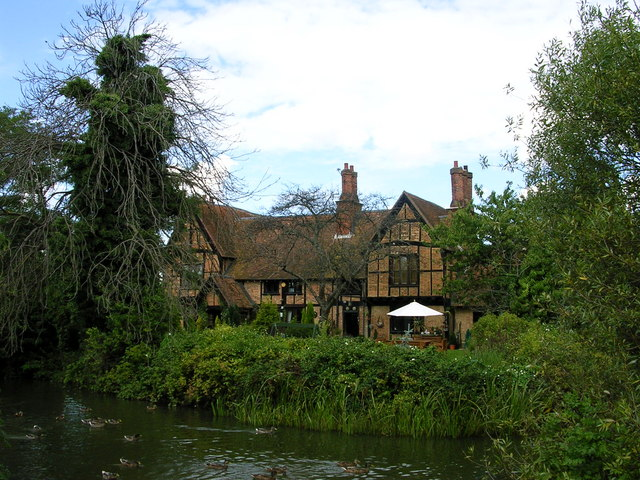

- Location within Bedfordshire
- Former names: Moat Farmhouse

General information
- Location: Marston Moretaine, Bedfordshire, England
- Coordinates: 52.0614°N 0.5528°W
- Ordnance Survey: SP9931041330
- Year built: Early 15th century
- Renovated: 16th century (extended and altered); 1880 (restored)

Website
- www.moreteynemanor.co.uk

Listed Building – Grade II*
- Official name: Moat Farmhouse
- Designated: 22 October 1952
- Reference no.: 1114050

Moreteyne Manor (previously known as Moat Farmhouse) is a 15th-century manor house in Marston Moretaine, Bedfordshire, England. For many years it was used as a farmhouse but is now a country house restaurant. It is a Grade II* listed building.

The house, originally built in the early 15th century but extended, modified and restored by 1880, is sited within a rectangular moat. It consists of a timber frame with brick infill and a clay tile roof. The crosswings at each end of the central hall are jettied at the first floor level.

== History ==
The manor house was owned from 1562 by the Lord of the Manor, Thomas Snagge, followed in 1571 by his son, Thomas Snagge (1536–1593), who was knight of the shire for Bedfordshire in 1571 and 1586 and also MP for Bedford and Speaker of the House of Commons in 1588. The latter's son, Sir Thomas Snagge (c.1564–1627) was MP for Bedford in 1586 and Sheriff of the county in 1607. On his death in 1627 his sons, yet another Thomas (also sheriff of the county) and Edward successfully inherited. The latter's only son Edward succeeded him in 1715 and died in 1739.

The Snagge family then sold the property to Sarah, Duchess of Marlborough who left it to her grandson, the Honorable John Spencer. The Spencers held the property until 1811 after which it passed to the Alington family, who in turn sold it to the Duke of Bedford in 1873. Substantial renovation of the building occurred in 1880 when it was converted to be the farmhouse of Moat Farm, during which all the oak panelling was removed to Woburn Abbey.

The property was sold to the Franklin family in 1920 and the Hillson family in 1948. Between 1983 and 1985 the house was converted to the present country house restaurant.

== See also ==
- Grade II* listed buildings in Bedfordshire
