= John Baker (MP for Bedford) =

16th-century English politician

John Baker (by 1501-1538 or later), of Bedford, was an English politician.

He was Mayor of Bedford for 1528-29 and 1537–38 and elected a member (MP) of the parliament of England for Bedford in 1529.
