= Thomas Bedford (MP) =

English politician

Thomas Bedford (fl. 1381–1423) was an English politician. He sat as MP for Bedford in 1386, 1393, 1394, 1395, January 1397, 1402 and May 1413.

He also served as clerk of the King's Bench from 1381 till 1413; commissioner of inquiry in Bedford in March 1386 concerning a case of lunacy; clerk of the peace in Bedfordshire from 1390 till 1422 and in Buckinghamshire from 1390 till 1397; and feodary of the Duchy of Lancaster in Bedfordshire and Buckinghamshire from February 1400 till 1408.
