= Richard Bethewater =

English politician

Richard Bethewater (fl. 1385–1408) was an English politician. He sat as MP for Bedford in 1399.

He was a mainpernor for Thomas Frereman.
