= John Kent (MP for Bedford) =

English politician (fl. 1399 – 1435)

John Kent (fl. 1399 – 1435) was an English politician who sat as MP for Bedford in 1406. He also served as bailiff of Bedford in 1408 and as mayor of Bedford from 1414–1415, and 1416–1417.

In July 1413, he acquired a bakery in Bedford.
