= William Henry Whitbread =

English politician

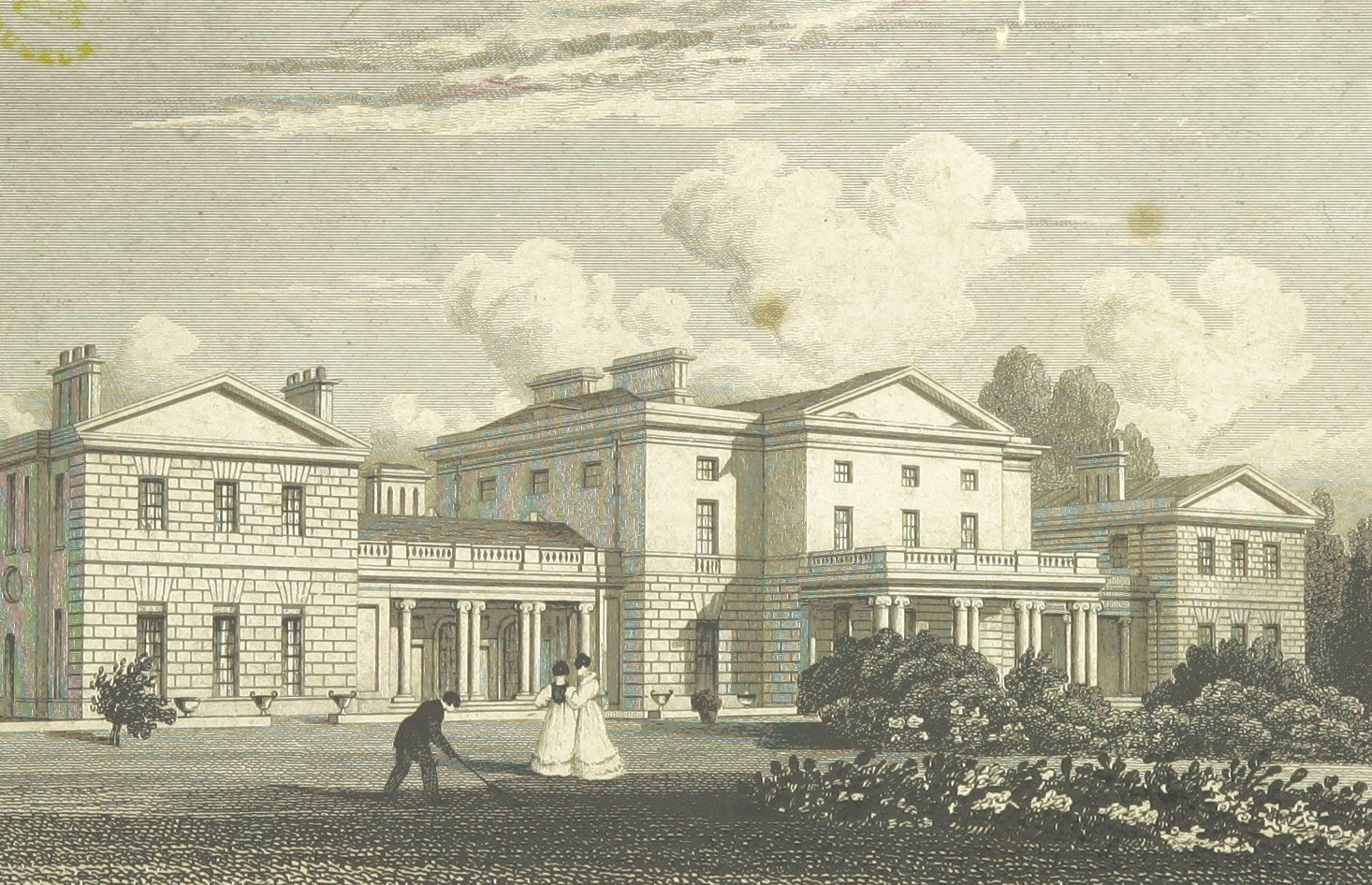
Southill Park, the Whitbread family estate

William Henry Whitbread (4 February 1795 – 21 June 1867) was an English Whig politician who sat in the House of Commons from 1818 to 1835.

Whitbread was the son of brewer Samuel Whitbread and his wife Lady Elizabeth Grey, the eldest daughter of Charles Grey, 1st Earl Grey. He was educated at Eton College and Trinity College, Cambridge. He was awarded a M.A. in 1816 and became a partner with his brother Samuel Charles Whitbread in the brewing firm.

In 1818 Whitbread was elected as a Member of Parliament (MP) for Bedford and held the seat until 1835. He was a J.P. and Deputy Lieutenant for Bedfordshire and became High Sheriff of Bedfordshire in 1837.

Whitbread lived at Southill Park, Bedfordshire and died at the age of 72.

Whitbread married on 5 November 1845 Mrs Harriet Macan (née Sneyd), daughter. of the Rev. Wettenhall Sneyd, of the Isle of Wight. They had no children. Her daughter from her first marriage Jane Emma Hannah Macan (1824–1892) married Mark McDonnell, 5th Earl of Antrim (1814–1869) in 1849.

Parliament of the United Kingdom
Preceded by Hon. William Waldegrave; Lord George Russell	Member of Parliament for Bedford; 1818 – 1835; With: Lord George Russell to 1830; Frederick Polhill 1830–1832; Samuel Crawley from 1832	Succeeded by Samuel Crawley; Frederick Polhill
