= Gordon Colling =

British trade unionist

Gordon Colling (10 March 1933 – 4 June 2011) was a British trade unionist.

Born in Sunderland to a family heavily involved in the Labour Party - both Colling's parents were councillors - Colling completed National Service with the Royal Air Force and was elected as secretary of Sunderland Trades Council. Colling studied at Ruskin College, but left early in 1960 after being involved in a car crash which left him with a permanent limp.

Colling worked as a linotype operator and was active in the Typographical Association. He moved to Manchester to become a full-time union employee, and when it merged into the National Graphical Association in 1965, he moved again to Bedford to remain on its staff, as National Political Officer.

In Bedford, Colling was elected as a Labour councillor, later becoming group leader. He was also secretary of Bedford Trades Council, and stood unsuccessfully for Bedford at the February 1974 general election. In 1985, he was elected to Labour's National Executive Committee, supported by both the left and right wings of the party, although he identified as a moderate, and acted as a whip for right-wingers on the committee. In 1994/95, he was Chair of the Labour Party.

Party political offices
| Preceded by David Blunkett | Chair of the Labour Party; 1994 – 1995 | Succeeded by Diana Jeuda |
