= Percy Barlow =

British politician

- Percy Barlow, c. 1909

High Sheriff of Middlesex
- In office 1927

Member of Parliament for Bedford
- In office 1906 - January 1910

Personal details
- Born: 11 July 1867
- Died: 18 June 1931 (aged 63)
- Party: Liberal Party
- Spouse: Clara Midelton (m. 1892)
- Children: 4
- Relatives: John Barlow (brother)
- Education: Pembroke College, Cambridge; Downing College, Cambridge
- Military career
- Allegiance: Great Britain
- Rank: Captain
- Conflicts: World War II

Percy Barlow JP (11 July 1867 – 18 June 1931) was a British Liberal Party politician and barrister.

== Background and education ==
He was the youngest son of Thomas Barlow and his wife Mary Ann Emmott, daughter of George Emmott. His older brother was Sir John Barlow, 1st Baronet.

Following private education, Barlow went to Pembroke College, Cambridge, where he graduated with a Bachelor of Arts in 1889, and then to Downing College, Cambridge, where he made his Master of Arts in 1893. He was called to the bar by the Inner Temple in 1892 and worked in the South-Eastern Circuit.

== Career ==
Barlow contested Bedford unsuccessfully in 1900. Six years later, at the 1906 general election he defeated the sitting Conservative Party MP entered the House of Commons as Member of Parliament (MP) for the constituency, representing it until his defeat at the next general election in January 1910. Whilst an MP he voted in favour of the 1908 Women's Enfranchisement Bill. During the First World War, he served as recruiting officer, ranked as a lieutenant in 1915. He was promoted to captain in 1917 and became liaison office to the Eastern Command.

After the war Barlow was nominated director of the national service in Hertford. In 1921, he was chosen deputy chairman of the Willesden Division of the Petty Sessions. He was appointed High Sheriff of Middlesex in 1927 and served as Justice of the Peace for that county.

== Family ==
On 12 April 1892, he married Clara Frances Midelton, eldest daughter of William Staple Lee Midelton. They had four children, two sons and two daughters.

Parliament of the United Kingdom
Preceded by Charles Pym	Member of Parliament for Bedford; 1906 – January 1910	Succeeded by Walter Attenborough
