= Samuel Whitbread (1830–1915) =

English brewer and politician

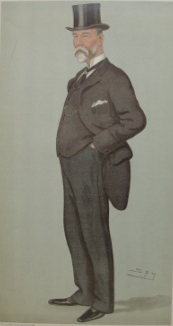
- "Parliamentary Procedure"; Whitbread as caricatured by Spy (Leslie Ward) in Vanity Fair, August 1895

Member of Parliament for Bedford
- In office 1852–1895 Serving with: Henry Stuart 1852–1854; William Stuart 1854–1857 & 1859–1868; Thomas Barnard 1857–1859; James Howard 1868–1874; Frederick Charles Polhill-Turner 1874–1880; Charles Magniac 1880–1885
- Preceded by: Henry Stuart; Sir Harry Verney, Bt
- Succeeded by: Charles Pym

Personal details
- Born: 5 May 1830
- Died: 25 December 1915 (aged 85)
- Party: Liberal
- Children: Samuel Whitbread
- Parent: Samuel Charles Whitbread (father)

Samuel Whitbread (5 May 1830 – 25 December 1915) was an English brewer and Liberal Party politician who sat in the House of Commons from 1852 to 1895.

== Biography ==
Whitbread was the eldest son of Samuel Charles Whitbread of Cardington, Bedfordshire and his wife Julia Brand, daughter of Lord Dacre. He was a member of the Whitbread brewing family. Whitbread was educated at Rugby School and Trinity College, Cambridge. He was private secretary to Sir George Grey in 1850 and in 1852 was elected as a Member of Parliament (MP) for Bedford. He was a frequent speaker during his time in the commons and was Civil Lord of the Admiralty from June 1859 to March 1863. He held his seat until 1895.

Whitbread lived at Southill Park, Biggleswade. He was J.P. and Deputy Lieutenant for Bedfordshire. He died at the age of 85.

== Family ==
Whitbread married Lady Isabella Charlotte Pelham, youngest daughter of Henry Pelham, 3rd Earl of Chichester on 9 July 1855. They had four children together, Samuel, Maude, Henry, and Francis.

His eldest son, Samuel Howard, followed his father into politics. Maud married her cousin Charles, son of Samuel's younger brother William. Henry married Mary Raymond and lived at Norton Bavant, Warminster. Francis married Ida, daughter of Charles Hanbury-Tracy, 4th Baron Sudeley, and lived at Burford House, Tenbury Wells.

Parliament of the United Kingdom
Preceded by Henry Stuart; Sir Harry Verney, Bt	Member of Parliament for Bedford; 1852 – 1895; With: Henry Stuart 1852–1854; William Stuart 1854–1857 & 1859–1868; Thomas Barnard 1857–1859; James Howard 1868–1874; Frederick Charles Polhill-Turner 1874–1880; Charles Magniac 1880–1885	Succeeded by Charles Pym
