= Samuel Crawley =

British politician

Samuel Crawley (16 December 1790 – 21 December 1852) was an English Whig politician who sat in the House of Commons variously between 1818 and 1841.

== Early life ==
He was the son of Samuel Crawley, of Keysoe, and his wife, the heiress Eliza Rankin. His paternal grandparents were married Susannah (née Sambrooke) Crawley (a daughter of Sir Samuel Sambrooke, 3rd Baronet, of Bush Hill) and John Crawley, MP for Marlborough.

His mother was the daughter of Elizabeth Condon, sister of Charles Condon (died 1781), heir to the Ragnall estate in Nottinghamshire, who changed his name to Mellish. She was involved in litigation of the 1780s with her cousin Mary Mellish, for the possession of Ragnall Hall ("the defendant was niece to the deceased, and one of the principal parties in his will"). In an initial case at Nottingham Assizes in 1785, Mary Mellish was successful in her plea of trespass against Eliza Rankin. Two subsequent cases went the other way.

Crawley was educated at Eton College from 1805 to 1808 and then at Christ Church, Oxford where he matriculated in 1808. In 1815, he inherited the estate of Stockwood in Bedfordshire from his uncle John.

== Career ==
On 12 February 1817, Crawley was appointed High Sheriff of Bedfordshire. In 1818 he was elected Member of Parliament for Honiton, through the influence of a relative, He held the seat until 1826. In 1819 he sold the Ragnall and Dunham estate, purchased by his father. In 1824 it was bought by John Angerstein.

At the 1832 general election Crawley was elected MP for Bedford. In the 1837 election his opponent Henry Stuart was elected, but was unseated on petition in 1838. Crawley was reinstated and held the seat until 1841.

== Personal life ==
On 19 June 1817, Crawley married Theodosia Mary Vyner (d. 1820), daughter of Robert Vyner and the former Lady Theodosia Maria Ashburnham (youngest daughter of John Ashburnham, 2nd Earl of Ashburnham). Before her death, they were the parents of one daughter.

- Theodosia Sambrooke Crawley (1818–1879), who married Clement, Comte de Mont Real, in 1839.

On 15 July 1822, he married his second wife, Maria Musgrave, granddaughter of Sir Philip Musgrave, 6th Baronet, by whom he had five sons and one daughter, including:

- John Sambrooke Crawley (1823–1895), who married Sarah Bridget Wells, second daughter of Frederick Octavius Wells of the Bengal Civil Service.
- Henry Sambrooke Crawley (b. 1824), who was a Lt. in the 1st Life Guards.
- Arthur Sambrooke Crawley (1825–1844), who was buried at Kensal Green.
- Philip Sambrooke Crawley (b. 1827), who served in the Coldstream Guards; he married Jane Francis Paget, a daughter of the Vice Admiral Sir Charles Paget.
- Anne Crawley (1833–1910), who died unmarried.

Crawley died at the age of 62 and was buried at Naples.

Parliament of the United Kingdom
Preceded by Howard Vyse; George Robinson	Member of Parliament for Honiton; 1818–1826; With: Peregrine Cust	Succeeded by John Josiah Guest; Henry Baines Lott
Preceded by Frederick Polhill; William Henry Whitbread	Member of Parliament for Bedford; 1832–1837; With: William Henry Whitbread 1832–1835; Frederick Polhill 1835–1837	Succeeded by Frederick Polhill; Henry Stuart
Preceded by Frederick Polhill; Henry Stuart	Member of Parliament for Bedford; 1838–1841; With: Frederick Polhill	Succeeded by Frederick Polhill; Henry Stuart
Honorary titles
Preceded by Henry Brandreth	High Sheriff of Bedfordshire; 1817–1818	Succeeded by John Pedley
