= Frederick Fox Riley =

British trade unionist and politician

Frederick Fox Riley (17 August 1869 – 3 February 1934) was a British trade unionist and politician.

Born in Hinckley in Leicestershire, Riley worked for the Post Office and became involved in the Postal and Telegraph Clerks' Association, rising to become its acting general secretary. He also became active in the Labour Party and stood unsuccessfully for the party in Leicester South at the 1918 general election and in the 1921 Bedford by-election. He was successfully in winning election to Leicester City Council, on which he served for nine years.

At the 1923 general election, Riley stood for Stockton-on-Tees, but did not win, and again missed election in 1924, before finally taking the seat in 1929. However, he lost the seat at the 1931 general election and died three years later.

Parliament of the United Kingdom
Preceded by Harold Macmillan	Member of Parliament for Stockton-on-Tees; 1929–1931	Succeeded by Harold Macmillan
