= Frederick Polhill =

British politician

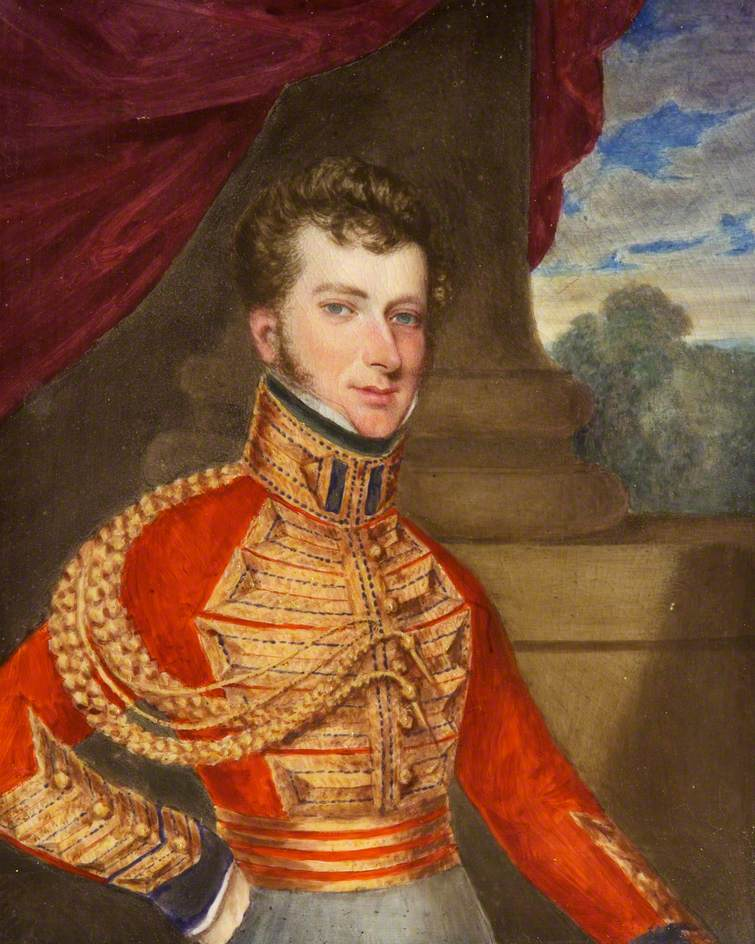
- Polhill in 1823

Member of Parliament for Bedford
- In office 8 January 1835 – 3 August 1847 Serving with Henry Stuart (1841–1847); Samuel Crawley (1838–1841); Henry Stuart (1837–1838); Samuel Crawley (1835–1837)
- Preceded by: William Henry Whitbread; Samuel Crawley
- Succeeded by: Henry Stuart; Harry Verney
- In office 2 August 1830 – 13 December 1832 Serving with William Henry Whitbread
- Preceded by: George Russell; William Henry Whitbread
- Succeeded by: William Henry Whitbread; Samuel Crawley

Personal details
- Born: 2 July 1798
- Died: 20 September 1848 (aged 50)
- Party: Conservative/Tory

Frederick Polhill (2 July 1798 – 20 September 1848) was a British Conservative and Tory politician.

He was the third son of John Polhill and Mary Bennett (their second son Charles predeceased his father, and their first son Thomas died six weeks after his father). His grandfather was Nathaniel Polhill. Frederick was baptised on 30 July 1798 at St Mary, St Marylebone Road, London. He married Frances Margaretta Deakin, daughter of John Deakin and Anna Maria Beauvoir of Bagthorpe House, Basford, Nottinghamshire, on 6 January 1824 at Basford. Frances was baptised at Basford on 30 January 1803.

He served in the 1st. King's Dragoon Guards. After his father's death in October 1828, he assumed the management for the family seat, Howbury Hall in Renholm.

Polhill first became a Tory Member of Parliament (MP) for Bedford at the 1830 general election, and held the seat until the 1832 general election when he was defeated. He returned to the seat at the 1835 general election as a Conservative and held it until 1847, when he was again defeated.

He became involved in the Drury Lane and Covent Garden theatres, resulting in heavy financial losses.

He married Frances Margarette Deakin. Their son was Frederick Charles Polhill-Turner, who also became a Member of Parliament. Frederick senior formally separated from his wife in April 1836, who later remarried. He moved in with Mary Ann Jeans. They had three illegitimate children.

Parliament of the United Kingdom
Preceded by George Russell; William Henry Whitbread	Member of Parliament for Bedford; 1830–1832; With: William Henry Whitbread	Succeeded by William Henry Whitbread; Samuel Crawley
Preceded by William Henry Whitbread; Samuel Crawley	Member of Parliament for Bedford; 1835–1847; With: Henry Stuart (1841–1847); Samuel Crawley (1838–1841); Henry Stuart (1837–1838); Samuel Crawley (1835–1837)	Succeeded by Henry Stuart; Harry Verney
