= Henry Stuart (MP) =

English politician

Member of Parliament for Bedford
- In office 1837-1838; 1841-1854

Personal details
- Born: 5 April 1804
- Died: 26 October 1854 (aged 50) Kempston, Bedfordshire, England
- Parent: William Stuart (father)
- Relatives: William Stuart (brother); John Stuart (grandfather); Thomas Penn (grandfather)

Henry Stuart (5 April 1804 – 26 October 1854, Kempston) was an English politician.

Stuart was the second and youngest son of The Most Rev. William Stuart, Archbishop of Armagh and Sophia Margaret Juliana Penn. His paternal grandfather was John Stuart, 3rd Earl of Bute and his maternal grandfather was Thomas Penn.

Stuart was elected MP for Bedford in 1837, but unseated on petition in May 1838. He was MP for Bedford again from 1841 until his death.

Parliament of the United Kingdom
Preceded by Samuel Crawley; Frederick Polhill	Member of Parliament for Bedford; 1837 – 1838; With: Frederick Polhill	Succeeded by Samuel Crawley; Frederick Polhill
Preceded by Samuel Crawley; Frederick Polhill	Member of Parliament for Bedford; 1841 – 1854; With: Frederick Polhill to 1847; Sir Harry Verney, Bt 1847–1852; Samuel Whitbread from 1852	Succeeded by William Stuart; Samuel Whitbread
