= Charles Pym (Conservative politician) =

British politician (1841–1918)

Charles Guy Pym
- Pym in 1895
- Born: 11 February 1841; Willian, Hertfordshire, England
- Died: 12 November 1918 (aged 77); Biggleswade, Bedfordshire, England
- Occupation: Member of parliament

Charles Guy Pym (11 February 1841 – 12 November 1918) was a British Conservative Party politician.

== Biography ==
Pym was born in Willian, the younger son of Rev. William Pym and Sophie Gambier. His grandfather Francis Pym had been MP for Bedfordshire. Pym was educated at Rossall School. Pym was appointed as a clerk in the War Office after passing his civil service exams in October 1859.

Pym was a keen sportsman and became involved with the Civil Service Cricket Club and along with William George Herbert was instrumental in setting up the Civil Service Athletics Association. He won the silver medal in the high jump event at the 1868 AAC Championships.

He was member of parliament (MP) for Bedford from 1895 to 1906. He was a Grand Councillor in the Primrose League.

He died aged 77.

Parliament of the United Kingdom
Preceded by Samuel Whitbread	Member of Parliament for Bedford; 1895–1906	Succeeded by Percy Barlow
