= Roger Kempston =

English politician

Roger Kempston (fl. October 1382 – 1417) was an English politician. He sat as MP for Bedford in October 1382 and September 1388.
