= John Williams (MP for Bedford) =

16th-century English politician

John Williams (c. 1519 – c. 1561) was Member of the English Parliament (MP) for Bedford in the Parliament held between 12 November 1554 and 16 January 1555.

Born in Bedford c. 1519, he was most probably educated at Bedford School. He became Mayor of Bedford three times, 1546–1547, 1549–1550 and 1551–1552.
