= Marston Moreteyne =

Village and civil parish in Bedfordshire, England

Coordinates: 52.06273°N 0.54781°W

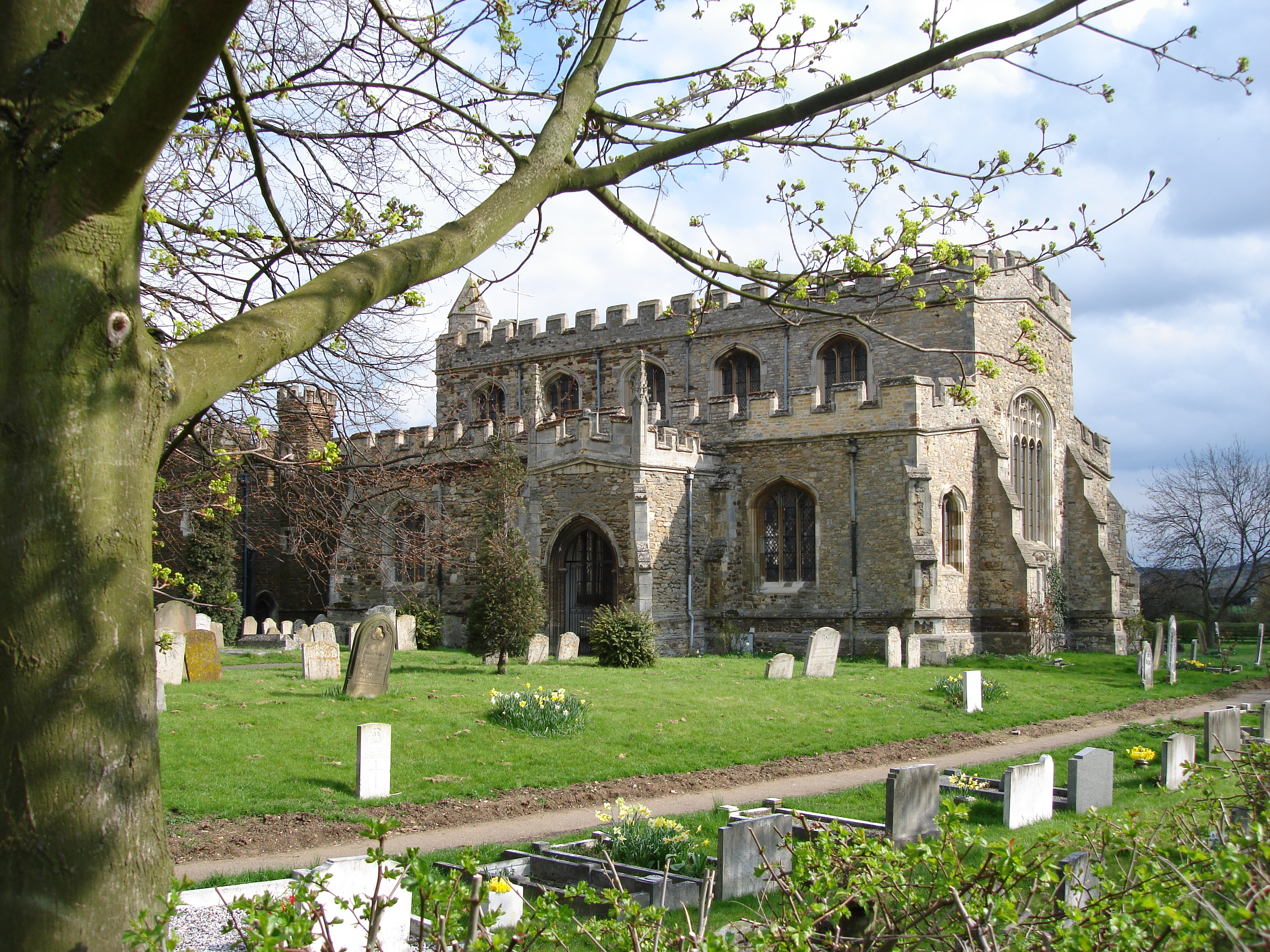
- Parish church of St Mary

- Location within Bedfordshire
- Interactive map of Marston Moreteyne
- Population: 4,556 (2011) census including Lower Shelton and Upper Shelton
- OS grid reference: SP995424
- Civil parish: Marston Moreteyne
- Unitary authority: Central Bedfordshire
- Ceremonial county: Bedfordshire
- Region: East
- Country: England
- Sovereign state: United Kingdom
- Post town: Bedford
- Postcode district: MK43
- Dialling code: 01234
- Police: Bedfordshire
- Fire: Bedfordshire
- Ambulance: East of England
- UK Parliament: Mid Bedfordshire

Marston Moreteyne (or Marston Moretaine) is a village and civil parish in the Central Bedfordshire district, in Bedfordshire, England, located on the A421 between Bedford and Milton Keynes. The population was 4,560 at the 2001 census, and 4,556 at the 2011 census. The village is served by Millbrook railway station, approximately 1 mile (1.6 km) away on the Marston Vale Line.

The place-name 'Marston Moretaine' is first attested in an Anglo-Saxon charter of 969, where it appears as Mercstuninga. It appears as Merestone in the Domesday Book of 1086. The name derives from the Old English mersc-tūn meaning 'town or settlement by a marsh'. It was held by the family of Moretaine, from Mortain in Normandy in France. Local roadsigns use either the "Moreteyne" and "Moretaine" spellings inconsistently. The official name of the civil parish was changed in 2018 from Marston Moretaine to Marston Moreteyne following a consultation by Central Bedfordshire Council.

Sir Thomas Snagge lived in the village in the 16th century. He owned the manor of Marston Moreteyne.

== Future development ==
Marston Park was allocated in the Mid-Bedfordshire Local Plan for an extension to the village of Marston Moretaine with a mix of land uses. In 2008, the developers O&H Properties gained outline planning permission for 480 new houses, 3 hectares (7.4 acres) of employment land for offices, a new local centre, a primary school, a community building and a sports ground with cricket field. David Lock Associates were then commissioned to produce a Design Code to guide the development, and this was approved by Central Bedfordshire Council in 2010. David Wilson Homes, Barratt Homes and Bovis Homes have begun building the houses and the community building, and have created play areas. The land allocated for employment and a local centre are currently reported to be for sale.

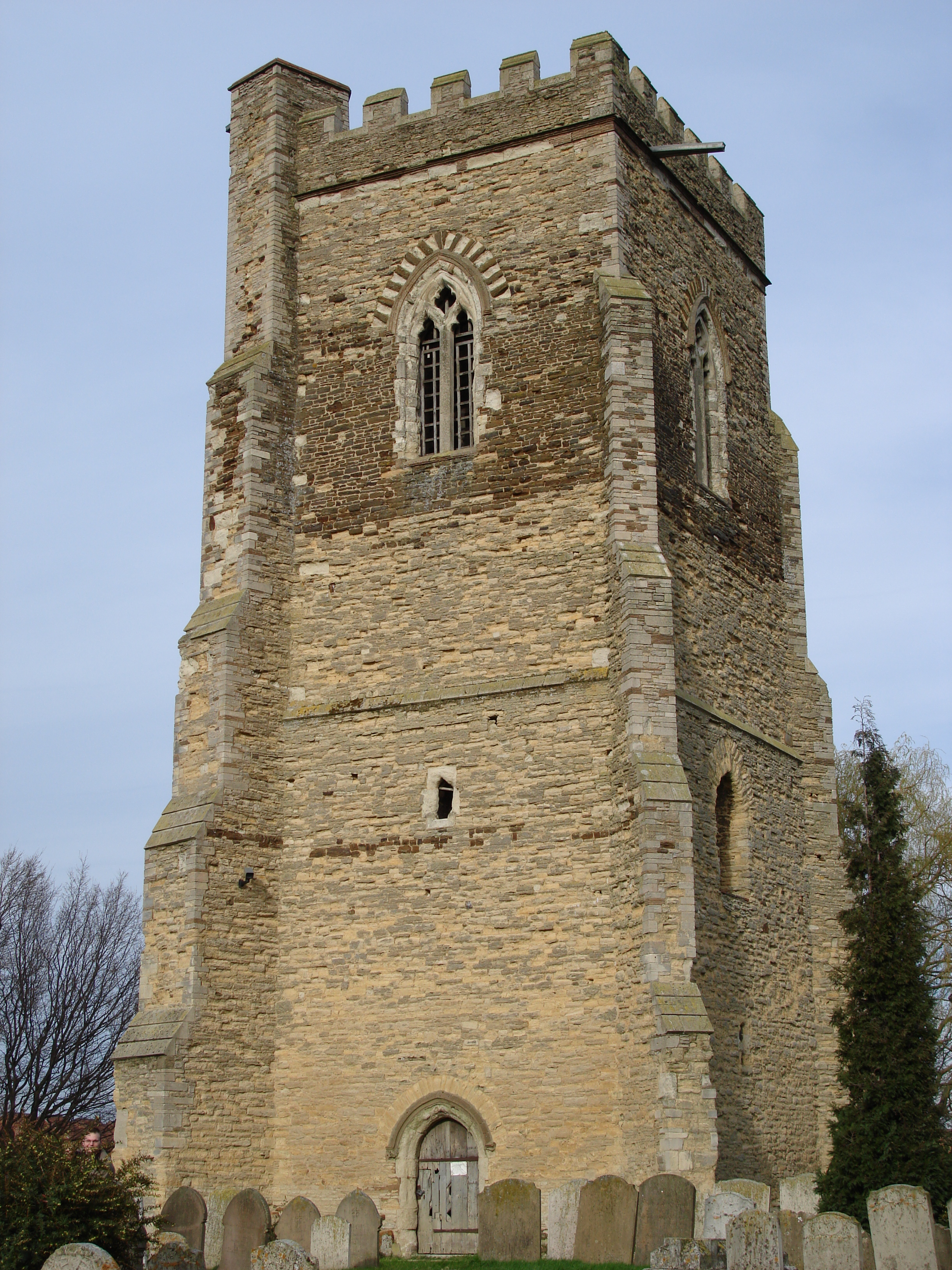
The rare feature of a detached tower at St Mary The Virgin in Marston Moretaine - Spring 2007

== St Mary's Church ==
Dating from around 1340, the church of St Mary the Virgin is a 14th-century church with a very rare feature for the East of England, a Grade I listed detached tower to the north of the church located about 70 feet (21 m) from the north wall of the chancel. Grade I listing denotes that the building is of outstanding or national architectural or historic interest.

Though building began c. 1340, the church was more or less rebuilt in 1445. The interior of the nave is very grand. The screen has paintings.

According to legend, the church's detached tower is the work of the Devil, who was trying to steal it. Finding it too heavy, he dropped it where it still remains.

== Notable residents ==
- Thomas Snagge (1536–1593), Speaker of the House of Commons, was lord of the manor of Marston Moretaine and his tomb is in the parish church
- James Smith (died 1667), poet, was a native of the village
- Edward Tylecote (1849–1938), cricketer, was born in the village
- Henry Tylecote (1853–1935), cricketer, was born in the village
- James Inkersole (died 1827), lost an arm at the Battle of Waterloo
- Captain Sir Thomas Moore (1920–2021), former British Army officer, who, at the age of 99, during the COVID-19 pandemic in 2020, raised over £32 million for NHS Charities Together by walking 100 laps of his garden.

== Governance ==
Marston Moreteyne is governed locally by Marston Moreteyne Parish Council. It sends a representative to the Central Bedfordshire Unitary Council. It is represented in the UK House of Commons by the constituency of Mid Bedfordshire.
