= Walter Attenborough =

British politician

Member of Parliament for Bedford
- In office January–December 1910

Personal details
- Born: 27 November 1850
- Died: 13 June 1932 (aged 81)
- Party: Conservative

Walter Annis Attenborough (27 November 1850 – 13 June 1932) was a British Conservative Party politician. He was elected at the January 1910 general election as Member of Parliament (MP) for Bedford (UK Parliament constituency), but was defeated by only 19 votes at the December 1910 general election.

Parliament of the United Kingdom
Preceded by Percy Barlow	Member of Parliament for Bedford; January 1910 – December 1910	Succeeded by Frederick Kellaway
