= William MacDowall Colhoun =

English politician

William MacDowall Colhoun (1740–1821) was a British politician and the member of Parliament for Bedford from 1784 to 1802.

== See also ==
- List of MPs in the first United Kingdom Parliament
