= Bedford (constituency) =

UK Parliament constituency (1295–1983, 1997 onwards)

- Borough constituency for the House of Commons
- Interactive map of boundaries from 2024
- Location within the East of England
- County: Bedfordshire
- Population: 101,066 (2011 census)
- Electorate: 70,068 (March 2020)
- Major settlements: Bedford, Kempston

Current constituency
- Created: 1997
- Member of Parliament: Mohammad Yasin (Labour)
- Seats: One
- Created from: North Bedfordshire and Mid Bedfordshire

1918–1983
- Seats: One
- Type of constituency: County constituency
- Replaced by: North Bedfordshire

1295–1918
- Seats: 1295–1885: Two; 1885–1918: One
- Type of constituency: Borough constituency

Bedford /ˈbɛdfərd/ is a constituency (Note: A borough constituency (for the purposes of election expenses and type of returning officer)) represented in the House of Commons of the UK Parliament since 2017 by Mohammad Yasin of the Labour Party. (Note: As with all constituencies, the constituency elects one Member of Parliament (MP) by the first past the post system of election at least every five years. It formerly had two members as set out in the article)

The seat dates back to the earliest century of regular parliaments, in 1295; its double representation was halved in 1885, then altered by the Representation of the People Act 1918. It was abolished in 1983 but re-established at the next periodic review for the 1997 general election.

== Constituency profile ==
The constituency is located in Bedfordshire and contains the large county town of Bedford and the contiguous town of Kempston.

Bedford is a historic market town and is linked by rail to London via the Thameslink service. Residents of the constituency have similar levels of wealth and education to the rest of the country. The constituency is ethnically diverse; 17% of residents are Asian, 7% are Black and there is also a large concentration of residents of Italian descent. At the most recent borough council election in 2023, the east of the town elected primarily Liberal Democrat councillors whilst Kempston and the west of Bedford elected Labour councillors. Voters in the constituency voted marginally in favour of leaving the European Union in the 2016 referendum, similar to the country as a whole.

== History ==
=== Up to the Great Reform Act 1832 ===
Bedford was first represented in the Model Parliament of 1295. The constituency was originally a parliamentary borough electing two Members of Parliament (MPs) to the House of Commons, and consisted of the five parishes making up the town of Bedford.

Before the Reform Act 1832, the right to vote was exercised by all freemen and burgesses of the town (whether or not they lived within the borough boundaries) and by all householders who were not receiving alms. This was a fairly wide franchise for the period, but potentially subject to abuse since the Corporation of the borough had unlimited power to create freemen. The corporation was usually under the influence of the Dukes of Bedford, but their influence usually fell well short of making Bedford a pocket borough.

In 1768, a majority of the corporation apparently fell out with the Duke at the time, and decided to free the borough from his influence. They elected a Huntingdonshire squire, (Note: a 5th baronet, the lowest order of nobility) Sir Robert Bernard, as recorder of the borough, and made 500 new freemen, mostly Bernard's Huntingdonshire neighbours or tenants. As there were only 540 householders, this gave him the effective power to choose Bedford's MPs; at the next election the defeated candidates petitioned against the result, attempting to establish that so many non-residents should not be allowed to vote, but the Commons dismissed the petition and confirmed the right of all the freemen, however created, to vote.

Bernard cemented his control with the creation of hundreds of further freemen in the next few years; at around the same period he lent the Corporation £950, and it is not unreasonable to assume this was payment for services rendered. However, in 1789, the young Duke of Bedford managed to regain the corporation's loyalty, and had 350 of his own retainers made freemen.

Even at other periods, the influence of the Dukes seems sometimes to have been more nominal than real. In the 1750s and 1760s, before Bernard's intervention, a frequent compromise was that the Duke nominated one MP and the corporation (representing the interests of the town) the other; but it seems that on occasion the Duke had to be flexible to retain the semblance of local deference towards him, and that his "nominee" had in reality been imposed upon him. Nor was the outcome invariably successfully predetermined: at the 1830 election the result swung on one individual's vote – the defeated candidate being Lord John Russell, who was not only one of the Whig leaders but The Duke of Bedford's son.

In 1831, the population of the borough was 6,959, and contained 1,491 houses. This was sufficient for Bedford to retain both its MPs under the Great Reform Act, with its boundaries unaltered. The reformed franchise introduced in 1832 gave the borough 1,572 inhabitants qualified to vote.

=== 1832–1983 ===
The town was growing, and Bedford retained its borough status until the 1918 general election, although under the Redistribution of Seats Act 1885, its representation was reduced to a single MP. On the eve of the First World War, its population was just under 40,000, of whom 6,500 people were eligible to vote.

Under the Representation of the People Act 1918, the parliamentary borough was abolished; but the town gave its name to a new county constituency (formally The Bedford division of Bedfordshire). As well as the town of Bedford, it covered the northern end of the county and included Kempston and Eaton Socon together with surrounding rural areas.

Under the Representation of the People Act 1948, a boundary change which came into effect at the 1950 election reduced its size somewhat, and under the Third Review of Westminster Constituencies in 1983, the constituency was abolished.

==== 1997 onwards ====
Under the Fourth Review, effective from the 1997 general election, Bedford was restored as a borough constituency, comprising the towns of Bedford and Kempston.

In the latest boundary changes under the Fifth Review, effective from the 2010 general election, there were marginal changes due to the revision of local authority wards.

The 2017 general election saw the Labour Party win the seat despite coming second in the election. This was significant as it was the first time the party had won the seat at an election where it had not won a comfortable national majority. This was repeated at the 2019 general election, where the seat was narrowly held by the Labour incumbent, despite the party suffering a heavy national defeat.

In the 2024 general election, the seat had a swing to Labour of 10.5%, with its majority of over 9,000 giving the party its largest ever majority over the Conservatives in the seat.

== Boundaries and boundary changes ==
=== Historic ===
==== 1832–1918 ====
- The Municipal Borough of Bedford.

==== 1918–1950 ====
- The Municipal Borough of Bedford;
- the Urban District of Kempston; and
- the Rural Districts of Bedford and Eaton Socon.

Expanded to include Kempston and rural areas in the north of Bedfordshire, transferred from the abolished constituency of Biggleswade.

==== 1950–1983 ====
- The Municipal Borough of Bedford;
- the Urban District of Kempston; and
- part of the Rural District of Bedford.

Eastern and southern rural areas, including Eaton Socon, transferred to Mid Bedfordshire.

Seat abolished in 1983 and absorbed into the new constituency of North Bedfordshire, with the exception of Kempston, which was transferred to Mid Bedfordshire.

==== 1997–2010 ====
Map of boundaries 2010-2024

- The Borough of Bedford wards of Brickhill, Castle, Cauldwell, De Parys, Goldington, Harpur, Kempston East, Kempston West, Kingsbrook, Newnham, Putnoe, and Queen's Park.

Re-established as a borough constituency, comprising the towns of Bedford from the now abolished seat of North Bedfordshire, and Kempston, regained from Mid Bedfordshire.

==== 2010–2024 ====
- The Borough of Bedford wards of Brickhill, Castle, Cauldwell, De Parys, Goldington, Harpur, Kempston East, Kempston North, Kempston South, Kingsbrook, Newnham, Putnoe, Queens Park.

Marginal changes due to the revision of local authority wards.

=== Current ===
Further to the 2023 review of Westminster constituencies, which came into effect for the 2024 general election, the constituency comprises the following, after taking into account the local government boundary review which came into effect in May 2023:

- The Borough of Bedford wards of: Brickhill (most); Castle & Newnham; Cauldwell (most); De Parys; Greyfriars; Goldington; Harpur (nearly all); Kempston Central and East; Kempston North; Kempston South; Kempston West (majority); Kingsbrook; Putnoe; Queens Park; Renhold & Ravensden (small part); Riverfield.

Marginal changes due to further revisions to local authority wards.

== Members of Parliament ==
=== MPs 1295–1660 ===
- Constituency created (1295)

Edward I – Edward II – Edward IV – Richard III – Henry VII – Henry VIII – Edward VI – Mary I – Elizabeth I – James I – Charles I – Protectorate – 1377-1427 – 1660-1885 – 1885-1983 – 1885-1983 – 1997-2017 – Elections

==== Parliaments of King Edward I ====
No.	Summoned	Elected	Assembled	Dissolved	First member	Second member
29th	30 September 1295+	1295	27 November 1295	4 December 1295	John Cullebere	Simon de Holand
30th	26 August 1296	1296	3 November 1296	29 November 1296	unknown	unknown
33rd	6 October 1297	1297	15 September 1297	14 October 1297	unknown	unknown
34th	15 March 1298	March 1298	30 March 1298	...	unknown	unknown
35th	10 April 1298	1298	25 May 1298	...	Thomas Halyday	Robert de Sywell
39th	29 December 1299	1299–00	6 March 1300	20 March 1300	John Wymond	William Benne
40th	26 September 1300	1300–01	20 January 1301	30 January 1301	John Wymond	William Benne
42nd	14 July 1302	1302	14 October 1302	21 October 1302	Simon le Tanner	Robert de Sywell
43rd	12 November 1304	1304–05	28 February 1305	20 March 1305	John Halyday	William Costyn
45th	5 April 1306	1306	30 May 1306	30 May 1306	Simon de Wilshamstead	Geoffrey le Blund
46th	3 November 1306	1306–07	20 January 1307	19 March 1307	William Costyn	John le Marescal

==== Parliaments of King Edward II ====
No.	Summoned	Elected	Assembled	Dissolved	First member	Second member
1st	26 August 1307	1307	13 October 1307	16 October 1307	William Bonum	John atte Wal
2nd	19 January 1308	1308	3 March 1308	...	unknown	unknown
5th	4 March 1309	1309	27 April 1309	13 May 1309	Gilbert de Holm	John le Marescal
8th	16 June 1311	1311	8 August 1311	...	John Halyday	Geoffrey Clogon (Glogon)
8th	...	1311	12 November 1311	18 December 1311	William Costyn (Costantyn)	Geoffrey Clogon (Glogon)
9th	3 June 1312	1312	20 August 1312	16 December 1312	William Costyn (Costantyn)	Roger Cullebere
10th	8 January 1313	1313	18 March 1313	9 May 1313	Thomas de Norfolk	John atte Wal
11th	23 May 1313	1313	8 July 1313	27 July 1313	Thomas de Norfolk	John atte Wal
12th	26 July 1313	1313	23 September 1313	15 November 1313	Thomas de Norfolk	John atte Wal
13th	29 July 1314	1314	9 September 1314	27/28 September 1314	Thomas de Norfolk	William Costantyn
14th	24 October 1314	1314–15	20 January 1315	9 March 1315	Geoffrey Glogon	William Costantyn
15th	16 October 1315	1315–16	27 January 1316	20 February 1316	no return	William Costantyn
16th	24–25 August 1318	1318	20 October 1318	9 December 1318	Henry Oliver	Geoffrey de Blunham
17th	20 March 1319	1319	6 May 1319	25 May 1319	Simon de Bydenham	Ralph le Collere
19th	5 August 1320	1320	6 October 1320	25/26 October 1320	Richard de Cave	Thomas Halyday
20th	15 May 1321	1321	15 July 1321	22 August 1321	John de Soham	Richard le Ussher
21st	14 March 1322	1322	2 May 1322	19 May 1322	Simon de Knightwyk	William Costantyn
22nd	18 September 1322	1322	14 November 1322	29 November 1322	Simon de Knightwyk	Richard de Cave
23rd	20 November 1323	1323–24	23 February 1324	18 March 1324	Thomas Halyday	Roger atte Wal
24th	6 May 1325	1325	25 June 1325	...	unknown	unknown
25th	10 October 1325	1325	18 November 1325	5 December 1325	unknown	unknown
26th	28 October 1326	1326–27	7 January 1327	20 January 1327	Hugh Balle	Hugh Cok

Back to Members of Parliament

==== Parliaments of King Edward III ====
No.	Summoned	Elected	Assembled	Dissolved	First member	Second member
1st	...	...	...	9 March 1327	unknown	unknown
2nd	7 August 1327	1327	15 September 1327	23 September 1327	Roger atte Wal	Simon Cullebere
3rd	10 December 1327	1327–28	7 February 1328	5 March 1328	Hugh Cok	William de Hoghton
4th	5 March 1328	1328	24 April 1328	14 May 1328	John de Lund, jnr.	Geoffrey le Neveu
5th	28 August 1328	1328	16 October 1328	22 February 1329	William Flour	John Scot
6th	25 January 1330	1330	11 March 1330	21 March 1330	Richard de Cave	Simon de Stevynton
7th	23 October 1330	1330	26 November 1330	9 December 1330	Robert Crowe	John Elcock
8th	16 July 1331	1331	30 September 1331	9 October 1331	William Costantyn	unknown
9th	27 January 1332	1332	16 March 1332	21 March 1332	John de Soham, jnr.	Geoffrey Walcock
10th	20 July 1332	1332	9 September 1332	12 September 1332	Hugh Balle	John Scot
11th	20 October 1332	1332	4 December 1332	27 January 1333	John de Soham	John de Codenho (Boddenho?)
12th	2 January 1334	1334	21 February 1334	2 March 1334	Richard de Cave	William le Clerk
13th	24 July 1334	1334	19 September 1334	23 September 1334	Richard de Cave	William le Clerk
14th	1 April 1335	1335	26 May 1335	3 June 1335	Richard de Cave	William de Holewelle
15th	22 January 1336	1336	11 March 1336	20 March 1336	John atte Lound	Henry Arnold
16th	29 November 1336	1336–37	3 March 1337	c.16 March 1337	unknown	unknown
17th	20 December 1337	1337–38	3 February 1338	14 February 1338	John de Styvecle	William de Holewell
18th	15 November 1338	1338–39	3 February 1339	17 February 1339	Robert Carbonel	William de Holewell
19th	25 August 1339	1339	13 October 1339	c.3 November 1339	unknown	unknown
20th	16 November 1339	1339–40	20 January 1340	19 February 1340	unknown	unknown
21st	21 February 1340	1340	29 March 1340	10 May 1340	unknown	unknown
22nd	30 May 1340	1340	12 July 1340	26 July 1340	unknown	unknown
23rd	3 March 1341	1341	23 April 1341	27–28 May 1341	unknown	unknown
24th	24 February 1343	1343	28 April 1343	20 May 1343	unknown	unknown
25th	20 April 1344	1344	7 June 1344	28 June 1344	unknown	unknown
26th	30 July 1346	1346	11 September 1346	20 September 1346	unknown	unknown
27th	13 November 1347	1348–48	14 January 1348	12 February 1348	unknown	unknown
28th	14 February 1348	1348	31 March 1348	13 April 1348	unknown	unknown
29th	25 November 1350	1350–51	9 February 1351	1 March 1351	unknown	unknown
30th	15 November 1351	1351–52	13 January 1352	11 February 1352	unknown	unknown
31st	15 March 1354	1354	28 April 1354	20 May 1354	unknown	unknown
32nd	20 September 1355	1355	23 November 1355	30 November 1355	unknown	unknown
33rd	15 February 1357	1357	17 April 1357	8–16 May 1357	unknown	unknown
34th	15 December 1357	1357–58	5 February 1358	27 February 1358	unknown	unknown
35th	3 April 1360	1360	15 May 1360	...	unknown	unknown
36th	20 November 1360	1360–61	24 January 1361	18 February 1361	unknown	unknown
37th	14 August 1362	1362	13 October 1362	17 November 1362	unknown	unknown
38th	1 June 1363	1363	6 October 1363	30 October 1363	unknown	unknown
39th	4 December 1364	1364–65	20 January 1365	17 February 1365	unknown	unknown
40th	20 January 1366	1366	4 May 1366	11 May 1366	unknown	unknown
41st	24 February 1368	1368	1 May 1368	21 May 1368	unknown	unknown
42nd	6 April 1369	1369	3 June 1369	11 June 1369	unknown	unknown
43rd	8 January 1371	1371	24 February 1371	29 March 1371	unknown	unknown
44th	1 September 1372	1372	3 November 1372	24 November 1372	unknown	unknown
45th	4 October 1373	1373	21 November 1373	10 December 1373	unknown	unknown
46th	28 December 1375	1375–76	28 April 1376	10 July 1376	unknown	unknown
47th	1 December 1376	1376–77	27 January 1377	2 March 1377	unknown	unknown

Back to Members of Parliament

==== Parliaments of King Richard II ====
No.	Summoned	Elected	Assembled	Dissolved	First member	Second member
1st	4 August 1377	1377	13 October 1377	5 December 1377	unknown	unknown
2nd	3 September 1378	1378	20 October 1378	16 November 1378	unknown	unknown
3rd	16 February 1379	1379	24 April 1379	27 May 1379	unknown	unknown
4th	20 October 1379	1379–80	16 January 1380	3 March 1380	unknown	unknown
5th	26 August 1380	1380	5 November 1380	6 December 1380	unknown	unknown
6th	16 July 1381	1381	3 November 1381	25 February 1382	unknown	unknown
7th	24 March 1382	1382	7 May 1382	22 May 1382	unknown	unknown
8th	9 August 1382	1382	6 October 1382	24 October 1382	unknown	unknown
9th	7 January 1383	1383	23 February 1383	10 March 1383	unknown	unknown
10th	20 August 1383	1383	26 October 1383	26 November 1383	unknown	unknown
11th	3 March 1384	1384	29 April 1384	27 May 1384	unknown	unknown
12th	28 September 1384	1384	12 November 1384	14 December 1384	unknown	unknown
13th	3 September 1385	1385	20 October 1385	6 December 1385	unknown	unknown
14th	8 August 1386	1386	1 October 1386	28 November 1386	unknown	unknown
15th	17 December 1387	1387–88	3 February 1388	4 June 1388	unknown	unknown
16th	28 July 1388	1388	9 September 1388	17 October 1388	unknown	unknown
17th	6 December 1389	1389–90	17 January 1390	2 March 1390	unknown	unknown
18th	12 September 1390	1390	12 November 1390	3 December 1390	unknown	unknown
19th	7 September 1391	1391	3 November 1391	2 December 1391	unknown	unknown
20th	23 November 1392	1392–93	20 January 1393	10 February 1393	unknown	unknown
21st	13 November 1393	1393–94	27 January 1394	6 March 1394	unknown	unknown
22nd	20 November 1394	1394–95	27 January 1395	15 February 1395	unknown	unknown
23rd	30 November 1396	1396–97	22 January 1397	12 February 1397	unknown	unknown
24th	18 July 1397	1397	17 September 1397	31 January 1398	unknown	unknown
25th	19 August 1399	1389	30 September 1399	30 September 1399	unknown	unknown

Back to Members of Parliament

==== Parliaments of King Henry IV ====
No.	Summoned	Elected	Assembled	Dissolved	First member	Second member
1st	30 September 1399	1399	6 October 1399	19 November 1399	unknown	unknown
2nd	9 September 1400	1400–01	20 January 1401	10 March 1401	unknown	unknown
3rd	19 June 1402	1402	30 September 1402	25 November 1402	unknown	unknown
4th	20 October 1403	1403–04	14 January 1404	20 March 1404	unknown	unknown
5th	25 August 1404	1404	6 October 1404	13 November 1404	unknown	unknown
6th	21 December 1405	1405–06	1 March 1406	22 December 1406	unknown	unknown
7th	26 August 1407	1407	20 October 1407	2 December 1407	unknown	unknown
8th	26 October 1409	1409–10	27 January 1410	9 May 1410	unknown	unknown
9th	21 September 1411	1411	3 November 1411	19 December 1411	unknown	unknown
10th	1 December 1412	1412–13	3 February 1413	20 March 1413	unknown	unknown

Back to Members of Parliament

==== Parliaments of King Henry V ====
No.	Summoned	Elected	Assembled	Dissolved	First member	Second member
1st	22 March 1413	1413	14 May 1413	9 June 1413	unknown	unknown
2nd	1 December 1413	1413–14	30 April 1414	29 May 1414	unknown	unknown
3rd	26 September 1414	1414	19 November 1414	...	unknown	unknown
4th	12 August 1415	1415	4 November 1415	12 November 1415	unknown	unknown
5th	21 January 1416	1416	16 March 1416	May 1416	unknown	unknown
6th	3 September 1416	1416	19 October 1416	18 November 1416	unknown	unknown
7th	5 October 1417	1417	16 November 1417	17 December 1417	unknown	unknown
8th	24 August 1419	1419	16 October 1419	13 November 1419	unknown	unknown
9th	21 October 1420	1420	2 December 1420	...	unknown	unknown
10th	26 February 1421	1421	2 May 1421	...	unknown	unknown
11th	20 October 1421	1421	1 December 1421	...	Thomas Manningham	unknown

Back to Members of Parliament

==== Parliaments of King Henry VI ====
No.	Summoned	Elected	Assembled	Dissolved	First member	Second member
1st	29 September 1422	1422	9 November 1422	18 December 1422	unknown	unknown
2nd	1 September 1423	1423	20 October 1423	28 February 1424	unknown	unknown
3rd	24 February 1425	1425	30 April 1425	14 July 1425	unknown	unknown
4th	7 January 1426	1426	18 February 1426	1 June 1426	unknown	unknown
5th	15 July 1427	1427	13 October 1427	25 March 1428	unknown	unknown
6th	12 July 1429	1429	22 September 1429	23 February 1430	unknown	unknown
7th	27 November 1430	1430–31	12 January 1431	20 March 1431	unknown	unknown
8th	25 February 1432	1432	12 May 1432	17 July 1432	unknown	unknown
9th	24 May 1433	1433	8 July 1433	>c.18 December 1433	unknown	unknown
10th	5 July 1435	1435	10 October 1435	23 December 1435	unknown	unknown
11th	29 October 1436	1436–37	21 January 1437	27 March 1437	unknown	unknown
12th	26 September 1439	1439	12 November 1439	c.15–24 February 1440	unknown	unknown
13th	3 December 1441	1441–42	25 January 1442	27 March 1442	unknown	unknown
14th	13 January 1445	1445	25 February 1445	9 April 1445	unknown	unknown
15th	14 December 1446	1446–47	10 February 1447	3 March 1447	unknown	unknown
16th	2 January 1449	1449	12 February 1449	16 July 1449	unknown	unknown
17th	23 September 1449	1449	6 November 1449	c.5–8 June 1450	unknown	unknown
18th	5 September 1450	1450	6 November 1450	c.24–31 May 1451	unknown	unknown
19th	20 January 1453	1453	6 March 1453	c.16–21 April 1454	unknown	unknown
20th	26 May 1455	1455	9 July 1455	12 March 1456	unknown	unknown
21st	9 October 1459	1459	20 November 1459	20 December 1459	unknown	unknown
22nd	30 July 1460	1460	7 October 1460	c.4 March 1461	unknown	unknown
23rd	15 October 1470	1470	26 November 1470	c. 11 April 1471	unknown	unknown

Back to Members of Parliament

==== 1377–1427 ====
Year	First member	Second member
1377 (Jan)	Thomas Jordan	
1380 (Jan)	Thomas Jordan	
1381	John Wright	
1382	Roger Kempston	
1384 (Apr)	William Clerevaux	
1385	William Clerevaux	Thomas Frereman
1386	William Clerevaux	Thomas Bedford
1388 (Feb)	William Clerevaux	Thomas Frereman
1388 (Sep)	Roger Kempston	William Barber
1390 (Jan)	William Clerevaux	Thomas Frereman
1390 (Nov)		
1391	Henry West	John Wright
1393	Thomas Bedford	John Tyringham
1394	Thomas Bedford	William Cotterstock
1395	Thomas Bedford	William Cotterstock
1397 (Jan)	Thomas Bedford	William Cotterstock
1397 (Sep)	Thomas Jordan	William Brown
1399	Richard Bethewater	Ralph Pyrewelle
1401
1402	Thomas Bedford	Roger Tunstall
1404 (Jan)
1404 (Oct)
1406	John Grey	John Kent
1407
1410
1411
1413(Feb)
1413 (May)	Thomas Bedford	William Cotterstock
1414 (Apr)
1414 (Nov)	William Dowe	William Wallyngton
1415
1416 (Mar)
1416 (Oct)
1417	John Frepurs	Richard Marston
1419	John Lyt..	
1420	Thomas Hunt	William Hunt
1421 (May)	Thomas Ferrour	John Leighton
1421 (Dec)	Thomas Bole	Thomas Kempston
1427	John Frepurs	

Back to Members of Parliament

==== Parliaments of King Edward IV ====
No.	Summoned	Elected	Assembled	Dissolved	First member	Second member
1st	23 May 1461	1461	4 November 1461	6 May 1462	unknown	unknown
2nd	22 December 1462	1462–63	29 April 1463	28 March 1465	unknown	unknown
3rd	28 February 1467	1467	3 June 1467	7 June 1468	John Boston	William Colet, jnr.
4th	19 August 1472	1472	6 October 1472	14 March 1475	John Boston	Thomas Adams
5th	20 November 1477	1477–78	16 January 1478	26 February 1478	William Colet	Thomas Adams
6th	15 November 1482	1482–83	20 January 1483	18 February 1483	unknown	unknown

Back to Members of Parliament

==== Parliaments of King Richard III ====
No.	Summoned	Elected	Assembled	Dissolved	First member	Second member
1st	9 December 1483	1483–84	23 January 1484	20 February 1484	unknown	unknown

Back to Members of Parliament

==== Parliaments of King Henry VII ====
No.	Summoned	Elected	Assembled	Dissolved	First member	Second member
1st	15 September 1485	1485	7 November 1485	c. 4 March 1486	unknown	unknown
2nd	...	1487	9 November 1487	c. 18 December 1487	unknown	unknown
3rd	...	?1488–89	13 January 1489	27 February 1490	unknown	unknown
4th	12 August 1491	1491	17 October 1491	5 March 1492	unknown	unknown
5th	15 September 1495	1495	14 October 1495	21–22 December 1495	unknown	unknown
6th	20 November 1496	1496–97	16 January 1497	13 March 1497	unknown	unknown
7th	...	?1503–04	25 January 1504	c. 1 April 1504	unknown	unknown

Back to Members of Parliament

==== Parliaments of King Henry VIII ====
No.	Summoned	Elected	Assembled	Dissolved	First member	Second member
1st	17 October 1509	1509–10	21 January 1510	23 February 1510	unknown	unknown
2nd	28 November 1511	1511–12	4 February 1512	4 March 1514	unknown	unknown
3rd	23 November 1514	1514–15	5 February 1515	22 December 1515	unknown	unknown
4th	...	1523	15 April 1523	13 August 1523	unknown	unknown
5th	9 August 1529	1529	3 November 1529	14 April 1536	John Baker	William Bourne
6th	27 April 1536	1536	8 June 1536	18 July 1536	unknown	unknown
7th	1 March 1539	1539	28 April 1539	24 July 1540	William Johnson	unknown
8th	23 November 1541	1541–42	16 January 1542	28 March 1544	William Johnson	Michael Thrayle
9th	1 December 1544	1544–45	23 November 1545	31 January 1547	George Blagge	Henry Parker

Back to Members of Parliament

==== Parliaments of King Edward VI ====
No.	Summoned	Elected	Assembled	Dissolved	First member	Second member
1st	2 August 1547	1547	4 November 1547	15 April 1552	Gerard Harvey alias Smart	George Wright
2nd	5 January 1553	1553	1 March 1553	31 March 1553	Thomas Leigh	William Godolphin

Back to Members of Parliament

==== Parliaments of Queen Mary I ====
No.	Summoned	Elected	Assembled	Dissolved	First member	Second member
1st	14 August 1553	1553	5 October 1553	5 December 1553	Edmund Mordaunt	Thomas Leigh
2nd	17 February 1554	1554	2 April 1554	3 May 1554	Edmund Mordaunt	Thomas Leigh
3rd	3 October 1554	1554	12 November 1554	16 January 1555	William Hall	John Williams
4th	3 September 1555	1555	21 October 1555	9 December 1555	Edmund Mordaunt	Thomas Leigh
5th	6 December 1557	1557–58	20 January 1558	17 November 1558	George Gascoigne	Thomas Leigh

Back to Members of Parliament

==== Parliaments of Queen Elizabeth I ====
No.	Summoned	Elected	Assembled	Dissolved	First member	Second member
1st	5 December 1558	28 December 1558	23 January 1559	8 May 1559	Thomas Leigh	George Gascoigne
2nd	10 November 1562	1562–63	11 January 1563	2 January 1567	Oliver St John	John Burgoyne
3rd	...	1571	2 April 1571	29 May 1571	Henry Cheeke	Robert Hatley
4th	28 March 1572	1572	8 May 1572	19 April 1583	Henry Cheeke	Michael Hawtry
5th	12 October 1584	1584	23 November 1584	14 September 1585	John Puckering	Nicholas Potts
6th	15 September 1586	1586	15 October 1586	23 March 1587	William Boteler	Thomas Snagge jnr
7th	18 September 1588	1588–89	4 February 1589	29 March 1589	John Pigott	Thomas Snagge
8th	4 January 1593	1593	18 February 1593	10 April 1593	John Pigott	Humphrey Winch
9th	23 August 1597	1597	24 October 1597	9 February 1598	Oliver Luke	Humphrey Winch
10th	11 September 1601	7 October 1601	27 October 1601	19 December 1601	Thomas Fanshawe	Humphrey Winch

Back to Members of Parliament

==== Parliaments of King James I ====
No.	Summoned	Elected	Assembled	Dissolved	First member	Second member
1st	31 January 1604	1604	19 March 1604	9 February 1611	Sir Humphrey Winch (made a judge in Ireland 1606)	Thomas Hawes
1st	31 January 1604	1606	19 March 1604	9 February 1611	Sir Christopher Hatton	Thomas Hawes
2nd	...	?1614	5 April 1614	7 June 1614	Alexander St John	John Leigh
3rd	13 November 1620	1620–21	16 January 1621	8 February 1622	Sir Alexander St John	Richard Taylor
4th	20 December 1623	1623–24	12 February 1624	27 March 1625	Sir Alexander St John	Richard Taylor

Back to Members of Parliament

==== Parliaments of King Charles I ====
No.	Summoned	Elected	Assembled	Dissolved	First member	Second member
1st	2 April 1625	1625	17 May 1625	12 August 1625	Sir Alexander St John	Richard Taylor
2nd	20 December 1625	1626	6 February 1626	15 June 1626	Sir Beauchamp St John	Richard Taylor
3rd	31 January 1628	1628	17 March 1628	10 March 1629	Sir Beauchamp St John	Richard Taylor
4th	20 February 1640	1640	13 April 1640	5 May 1640	Sir Beauchamp St John	Sir Samuel Luke
5th	24 September 1640	1640	3 November 1640	16 March 1660	Sir Beauchamp St John	Sir Samuel Luke

Back to Members of Parliament

==== Parliaments of the Protectorate ====
No.	Elected	Assembled	Dissolved	First member
1st	July 1654	3 September 1654	22 January 1655	Bulstrode Whitelocke
1st	4 November 1654	3 September 1654	22 January 1655	Henry Chester
2nd	1656	17 September 1656	4 February 1658	Thomas Margets
3rd	1659	27 January 1659	22 April 1659	Thomas Margets; Samuel Browne

Back to Members of Parliament

=== MPs 1660–1885 ===
Year	First member	First party	Second member	Second party
10 April 1660	Sir Samuel Luke		Humphrey Winch	
25 March 1661	Richard Taylor		John Kelyng (Note: A double return was made for Kelying and Sir Samuel Luke; Kelyng was allowed to sit)	
10 July 1663	Richard Taylor		Paulet St John	
30 December 1667	Sir William Beecher		Paulet St John	
12 February 1679	Sir William Francklyn		Paulet St John	
18 August 1679	Sir William Francklyn		Paulet St John	
17 February 1681	Sir William Francklyn		Paulet St John	
6 March 1685	Sir Anthony Chester, 3rd Baronet	Tory	Thomas Christie (Note: A double return was made for Christie and Sir William Francklyn in 1690; Christie was allowed to sit)	Tory
9 January 1689	Thomas Hillersden	Whig	Thomas Christie	Tory
13 May 1690	Thomas Hillersden	Whig	Thomas Christie	Tory
5 May 1695	Thomas Hillersden	Whig	William Farrer	Whig
18 March 1698	William Spencer		William Farrer	Whig
20 July 1698	William Spencer		Sir Thomas Alston, 3rd Baronet	
c. January 1701	William Spencer		Samuel Rolt	Tory
21 November 1701	William Spencer		William Farrer	Whig
17 July 1702	William Spencer		Edward Carteret	Whig
11 May 1705	William Farrer	Whig	Sir Philip Monoux, 3rd Baronet	Whig
15 December 1707	William Farrer	Whig	William Hillersden	Whig
5 May 1708	William Farrer	Whig	William Hillersden	Whig
14 April 1710	William Farrer	Whig	John Cater	Whig
6 October 1710	William Farrer	Whig	John Cater	Whig
27 August 1713	Samuel Rolt	Tory	John Cater	Whig
28 January 1715	William Farrer	Whig	John Thurlow Brace	Whig
2 December 1715	William Farrer	Whig	John Thurlow Brace	Whig
21 March 1722	William Farrer	Whig	George Huxley	
9 June 1725	William Farrer	Whig	John Thurlow Brace	Whig
15 August 1727	John Orlebar	Whig	John Thurlow Brace	Whig
16 April 1728	John Orlebar	Whig	James Metcalfe (Note: Declared elected and Brace unseated on petition)	Tory
30 January 1731	John Orlebar	Whig	Sir Jeremy Vanacker Sambrooke, Bt	Tory
26 April 1734	Samuel Ongley	Tory	Sir Jeremy Vanacker Sambrooke, Bt	Tory
24 November 1740	Samuel Ongley	Tory	Sir Boteler Chernock, 4th Baronet	Tory
5 May 1741	Samuel Ongley	Tory	Sir Boteler Chernock, 4th Baronet	Tory
29 June 1747	Thomas Gore		John Offley	
15 April 1754	Francis Herne		Robert Henley-Ongley	
26 March 1761	Francis Herne		Richard Vernon	Whig
24 April 1764	Francis Herne		Richard Vernon	Whig
17 March 1768	Samuel Whitbread	Tory	Richard Vernon	Whig
18 October 1774	Sir William Wake, 8th Baronet	Tory	Robert Sparrow	Tory
23 March 1775	Sir William Wake, 8th Baronet	Tory	Samuel Whitbread (Note: Declared elected and Sparrow unseated on petition)	Whig
14 September 1780	Sir William Wake, 8th Baronet	Tory	Samuel Whitbread	Whig
5 April 1784	William MacDowall Colhoun	Tory	Samuel Whitbread	Whig
28 June 1790	William MacDowall Colhoun	Tory	Samuel Whitbread	Whig
27 May 1796	William MacDowall Colhoun	Tory	Samuel Whitbread	Whig
6 July 1802	William Lee-Antonie	Whig	Samuel Whitbread	Whig
30 October 1806	William Lee-Antonie	Whig	Samuel Whitbread	Whig
11 May 1807	William Lee-Antonie	Whig	Samuel Whitbread	Whig
6 October 1812	Lord George Russell	Whig	Samuel Whitbread	Whig
17 July 1815	Lord George Russell	Whig	Hon. William Waldegrave	Whig
17 June 1818	Lord George Russell	Whig	William Henry Whitbread	Whig
8 March 1820	Lord George Russell	Whig	William Henry Whitbread	Whig
9 June 1826	Lord George Russell	Whig	William Henry Whitbread	Whig
2 August 1830	Frederick Polhill	Tory	William Henry Whitbread	Whig
29 April 1831	Frederick Polhill	Tory	William Henry Whitbread	Whig
1832	Samuel Crawley	Whig	William Henry Whitbread	Whig
1835	Samuel Crawley	Whig	Frederick Polhill	Conservative
1837	Henry Stuart (Note: At the election of 1837, Stuart was initially declared elected, but on petition his election was declared void and after scrutiny of the votes his opponent Crawley was declared elected instead)	Conservative	Frederick Polhill	Conservative
1838	Samuel Crawley	Whig	Frederick Polhill	Conservative
1841	Henry Stuart	Conservative	Frederick Polhill	Conservative
1847	Henry Stuart	Conservative	Sir Harry Verney, 2nd Baronet	Whig
1852	Henry Stuart	Conservative	Samuel Whitbread	Whig
1854	William Stuart	Conservative	Samuel Whitbread	Whig
1857	Thomas Barnard	Whig	Samuel Whitbread	Whig
1859	William Stuart	Conservative	Samuel Whitbread	Liberal
1868	James Howard	Liberal	Samuel Whitbread	Liberal
1874	Frederick Polhill-Turner	Conservative	Samuel Whitbread	Liberal
1880	Charles Magniac	Liberal	Samuel Whitbread	Liberal

- Reduced to one member (1885)

Back to Members of Parliament

=== MPs 1885–1983 ===
Election	Member	Party	Notes
1885	Samuel Whitbread	Liberal	
1895	Charles Pym	Conservative	
1906	Percy Barlow	Liberal	
1910 (Jan)	Walter Attenborough	Conservative	
1910 (Dec)	Frederick Kellaway	Liberal	
1916	Frederick Kellaway	Coalition Liberal	
Constituency merged with majority of the abolished Biggleswade
1918	Frederick Kellaway	Coalition Liberal	Secretary for Overseas Trade (1920–1921); Postmaster General (1921–1922)
1922	Frederick Kellaway	National Liberal	Secretary for Overseas Trade (1920–1921); Postmaster General (1921–1922)
1922	Sir Richard Wells, 1st Baronet	Conservative	
1945	Thomas Skeffington-Lodge	Labour	
1950	Christopher Soames	Conservative	Secretary of State for War (1958–1960); Minister of Agriculture, Fisheries and Food (1960–1964)
1966	Brian Parkyn	Labour	
1970	Trevor Skeet	Conservative	Contested North Bedfordshire following redistribution
1983	Constituency abolished: see North Bedfordshire		

Back to Members of Parliament

=== MPs 1997–2017 ===
Election	Member	Party
1997	Patrick Hall	Labour
2010	Richard Fuller	Conservative
2017	Mohammad Yasin	Labour

=== Notes ===
Back to Members of Parliament

== Elections ==
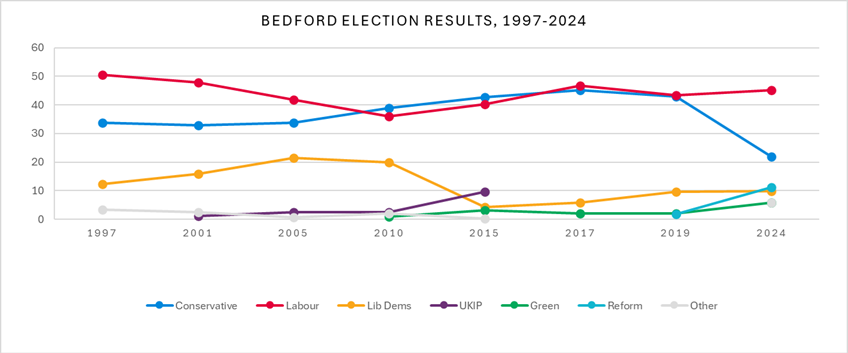
Bedford election results 1997–2024

- 2010s
- 2000s
- 1990s
- 1970s
- 1960s
- 1950s
- 1940s
- 1930s
- 1920s
- 1910s
- 1900s
- 1890s
- 1880s
- 1870s
- 1860s
- 1850s
- 1840s
- 1830s
- 1820s
- 1810s
- 1800s
- 1790s

=== Elections in the 2020s ===
General election 2024: Bedford
Party	Candidate	Votes	%	±%
Labour	Mohammad Yasin	18,342	45.1	▲0.8
Conservative	Pinder Chauhan	8,912	21.9	▼20.0
Reform	Matt Lansley	4,548	11.2	▲9.5
Liberal Democrats	Henry Vann	4,025	9.9	▼0.1
Green	Ben Foley	2,394	5.9	▲3.9
Independent	Tarek Javed	1,442	3.5	new
Workers Party	Prince Chaudhury	996	2.4	new
Majority		9,430	23.2	▲20.9
Turnout		40,659	56.4	▼10.1
Registered electors		72,478		+2,410
Labour hold		Swing	▲10.5	

=== Elections in the 2010s ===
2019 notional result
Party	Vote	%
Labour	20,663	44.3
Conservative	19,550	42.0
Liberal Democrats	4,672	10.0
Green	924	2.0
Brexit Party	794	1.7
Turnout	46,603	66.5
Electorate	70,068	

General election 2019: Bedford
Party	Candidate	Votes	%	±%
Labour	Mohammad Yasin	20,491	43.3	−3.5
Conservative	Ryan Henson	20,346	43.0	−2.2
Liberal Democrats	Henry Vann	4,608	9.7	+3.8
Green	Adrian Spurrell	960	2.0	−0.1
Brexit Party	Charles Bunker	896	1.9	N/A
Majority		145	0.3	−1.3
Turnout		47,301	66.1	−1.4
Registered electors		71,581		–248
Labour hold		Swing	−0.7	

This was the smallest Labour majority at the 2019 general election.

General election 2017: Bedford
Party	Candidate	Votes	%	±%
Labour	Mohammad Yasin	22,712	46.8	+6.6
Conservative	Richard Fuller	21,923	45.2	+2.6
Liberal Democrats	Henry Vann	2,837	5.9	+1.6
Green	Lucy Bywater	1,008	2.1	−1.0
Majority		789	1.6	N/A
Turnout		48,480	67.5	+1.0
Registered electors		71,829		+2,518
Labour gain from Conservative		Swing	+2.0	

General election 2015: Bedford
Party	Candidate	Votes	%	±%
Conservative	Richard Fuller	19,625	42.6	+3.7
Labour	Patrick Hall	18,528	40.2	+4.3
UKIP	Charlie Smith	4,434	9.6	+7.1
Liberal Democrats	Mahmud Rogers	1,958	4.2	−15.6
Green	Ben Foley	1,412	3.1	+2.2
Independent	Faruk Choudhury	129	0.3	N/A
Majority		1,097	2.4	−0.6
Turnout		46,086	66.5	+0.6
Registered electors		69,311		+820
Conservative hold		Swing	−0.3	

General election 2010: Bedford
Party	Candidate	Votes	%	±%
Conservative	Richard Fuller	17,546	38.9	+5.4
Labour	Patrick Hall	16,193	35.9	−5.7
Liberal Democrats	Henry Vann	8,957	19.9	−1.6
UKIP	Mark Adkin	1,136	2.5	+0.1
BNP	William Dewick	757	1.7	N/A
Green	Ben Foley	393	0.9	N/A
Independent	Samrat Deep Bhandari	120	0.3	N/A
Majority		1,353	3.0	N/A
Turnout		45,102	65.9	+3.8
Registered electors		68,491		+21
Conservative gain from Labour		Swing	+5.5	

Back to Elections

2005 notional result
Party	Vote	%
Labour	17,657	41.6
Conservative	14,244	33.5
Liberal Democrats	9,263	21.8
UKIP	1,011	2.4
Others	283	0.7
Turnout	42,458	62.0
Electorate	68,470	

=== Elections in the 2000s ===
General election 2005: Bedford
Party	Candidate	Votes	%	±%
Labour	Patrick Hall	17,557	41.7	−6.2
Conservative	Richard Fuller	14,174	33.7	+0.9
Liberal Democrats	Michael Headley	9,063	21.5	+5.7
UKIP	Peter Conquest	995	2.4	+1.3
Independent	John McCready	283	0.7	N/A
Majority		3,383	8.0	−7.1
Turnout		42,072	59.6	−0.3
Registered electors		70,629		+2,866
Labour hold		Swing	−3.5	

General election 2001: Bedford
Party	Candidate	Votes	%	±%
Labour	Patrick Hall	19,454	47.9	−2.7
Conservative	Charlotte Attenborough	13,297	32.8	−0.9
Liberal Democrats	Michael Headley	6,425	15.8	+3.5
Independent	Richard Rawlins	973	2.4	N/A
UKIP	Jennifer Lo Bianco	430	1.1	N/A
Majority		6,157	15.1	−1.8
Turnout		40,579	59.9	−13.6
Registered electors		67,763		+1,203
Labour hold		Swing	−0.9	

Back to Elections

=== Elections in the 1990s ===
General election 1997: Bedford
Party	Candidate	Votes	%	±%
Labour	Patrick Hall	24,774	50.6	+14.2
Conservative	Bob Blackman	16,474	33.7	−11.8
Liberal Democrats	Christopher Noyce	6,044	12.3	−4.1
Referendum	Peter Conquest	1,503	3.1	N/A
Natural Law	Patricia Saunders	149	0.3	N/A
Majority		8,300	16.9	N/A
Turnout		48,944	73.5	–3.0
Registered electors		66,560		+796
Labour gain from Conservative		Swing	+13.0	

Back to Elections

1992 notional result
Party	Vote	%
Conservative	22,863	45.4
Labour	18,318	36.4
Liberal Democrats	8,263	16.4
Others	881	1.8
Turnout	50,325	76.5
Electorate	65,764	

=== Elections in the 1970s ===
General election 1979: Bedford
Party	Candidate	Votes	%	±%
Conservative	Trevor Skeet	31,140	51.21	+7.60
Labour	NA Hyman	18,727	30.80	−5.64
Liberal	B Gibbons	10,129	16.66	−3.29
National Front	R Stearns	813	1.34	N/A
Majority		12,413	20.41	+13.23
Turnout		60,809	78.65	
Conservative hold		Swing	+6.62	

General election October 1974: Bedford
Party	Candidate	Votes	%	±%
Conservative	Trevor Skeet	24,834	43.61	+1.10
Labour	Brian Parkyn	20,746	36.43	+4.06
Liberal	JC Griffiths	11,360	19.95	−5.16
Majority		4,088	7.18	−2.96
Turnout		56,940	76.80	
Conservative hold		Swing	−1.48	

General election February 1974: Bedford
Party	Candidate	Votes	%	±%
Conservative	Trevor Skeet	26,082	42.51	−8.00
Labour	Gordon Colling	19,861	32.37	−8.01
Liberal	JC Griffiths	15,405	25.11	+16.01
Majority		6,221	10.14	+0.01
Turnout		61,348	83.51	
Conservative hold		Swing	+0.01	

General election 1970: Bedford
Party	Candidate	Votes	%	±%
Conservative	Trevor Skeet	26,330	50.52	+6.06
Labour	Brian Parkyn	21,051	40.39	−4.83
Liberal	Arthur W Butcher	4,740	9.09	+1.23
Majority		5,279	10.13	N/A
Turnout		52,121	77.31	
Conservative gain from Labour		Swing	+5.45	

Back to Elections

=== Elections in the 1960s ===
General election 1966: Bedford
Party	Candidate	Votes	%	±%
Labour	Brian Parkyn	22,257	45.22	+6.69
Conservative	Christopher Soames	21,879	44.46	−0.73
Liberal	John E Burrell	5,080	10.32	−5.96
Majority		378	0.76	N/A
Turnout		49,216	81.55	
Labour gain from Conservative		Swing	+3.71	

General election 1964: Bedford
Party	Candidate	Votes	%	±%
Conservative	Christopher Soames	21,404	45.18	−5.68
Labour	Brian Parkyn	18,256	38.54	+2.32
Liberal	Walter Ernest Norton	7,712	16.28	+3.36
Majority		3,148	6.64	−8.01
Turnout		47,372	80.41	
Conservative hold		Swing	−4.00	

Back to Elections

=== Elections in the 1950s ===
General election 1959: Bedford
Party	Candidate	Votes	%	±%
Conservative	Christopher Soames	23,495	50.87	−4.68
Labour	Maurice Foley	16,728	36.22	−8.24
Liberal	Maurice L Rowlandson	5,966	12.92	N/A
Majority		6,767	14.65	+3.55
Turnout		46,189	83.56	
Conservative hold		Swing	+1.78	

General election 1955: Bedford
Party	Candidate	Votes	%	±%
Conservative	Christopher Soames	24,733	55.55	+6.12
Labour	Harold James Aldridge	19,792	44.45	+0.94
Majority		4,941	11.10	+5.19
Turnout		44,525	81.79	
Conservative hold		Swing	+2.59	

General election 1951: Bedford
Party	Candidate	Votes	%	±%
Conservative	Christopher Soames	23,278	49.43	+1.77
Labour	Peter Parker	20,494	43.52	+0.44
Liberal	Frederick Henry Philpott	3,323	7.06	−1.76
Majority		2,784	5.91	+1.33
Turnout		47,095	87.14	
Conservative hold		Swing	+0.67	

General election 1950: Bedford
Party	Candidate	Votes	%	±%
Conservative	Christopher Soames	21,942	47.66	
Labour	Thomas Skeffington-Lodge	19,834	43.08	
Liberal	Leonard John Humphrey	4,060	8.82	
Communist	Betty Matthews	207	0.45	N/A
Majority		2,108	4.58	N/A
Turnout		46,043	87.55	
Conservative gain from Labour		Swing		

Back to Elections

=== Elections in the 1940s ===
General election 1945: Bedford
Party	Candidate	Votes	%	±%
Labour	Thomas Skeffington-Lodge	19,849	41.71	
Conservative	Richard Wells	19,561	41.10	
Liberal	Leonard John Humphrey	8,183	17.19	
Majority		288	0.61	N/A
Turnout		47,593	73.10	
Labour gain from Conservative		Swing		

Back to Elections

=== Elections in the 1930s ===
General election 1935: Bedford
Party	Candidate	Votes	%	±%
Conservative	Richard Wells	22,476	62.29	
Labour	Norman Mickle	13,604	37.71	
Majority		8,872	24.58	
Turnout		36,080	73.39	
Conservative hold		Swing		

General election 1931: Bedford
Party	Candidate	Votes	%	±%
Conservative	Richard Wells	25,030	72.17	
Labour	Clare Annesley	9,654	27.83	
Majority		15,376	44.34	
Turnout		34,684	73.25	
Conservative hold		Swing		

Back to Elections

=== Elections in the 1920s ===
General election 1929: Bedford
Party	Candidate	Votes	%	±%
Unionist	Richard Wells	16,724	46.0	−6.1
Liberal	Alfred Machin	10,520	28.9	−0.5
Labour	George Dixon	9,147	25.1	+6.6
Majority		6,204	17.1	−5.6
Turnout		36,391	79.1	−2.6
Unionist hold		Swing	−2.8	

General election 1924: Bedford
Party	Candidate	Votes	%	±%
Unionist	Richard Wells	15,000	52.1	+1.2
Liberal	Milner Gray	8,451	29.4	−19.7
Labour	George Dixon	5,330	18.5	N/A
Majority		6,549	22.7	+20.9
Turnout		28,781	81.7	+8.2
Unionist hold		Swing	+10.4	

General election 1923: Bedford
Party	Candidate	Votes	%	±%
Unionist	Richard Wells	12,906	50.9	+0.6
Liberal	Milner Gray	12,449	49.1	+41.3
Majority		457	1.8	−27.1
Turnout		25,355	73.5	−5.6
Unionist hold		Swing	−20.4	

Lady Lawson

General election 1922: Bedford
Party	Candidate	Votes	%	±%
Unionist	Richard Wells	13,460	50.3	N/A
National Liberal	Frederick Kellaway	5,714	21.4	−38.5
Labour	Arthur Sells	5,477	20.5	N/A
Liberal	Mary Camilla Lawson	2,075	7.8	N/A
Majority		7,746	28.9	N/A
Turnout		26,726	79.1	+33.9
Unionist gain from National Liberal		Swing		

1921 Bedford by-election
Party		Candidate	Votes	%	±%
C	National Liberal	Frederick Kellaway	14,397	59.7	−13.0
	Labour	Frederick Fox Riley	9,731	40.3	N/A
Majority			4,666	19.4	−26.0
Turnout			24,128		
Registered electors					
	National Liberal hold		Swing		
C indicates candidate endorsed by the coalition government.

Back to Elections

=== Elections in the 1910s ===
Kellaway

General election 1918: Bedford
Party		Candidate	Votes	%
C	National Liberal	Frederick Kellaway	10,933	72.7
	Independent	Henry Burridge	4,096	27.3
Majority			6,837	45.4
Turnout			15,029	45.2
Registered electors				
	National Liberal win (new boundaries)			
C indicates candidate endorsed by the coalition government.

General Election 1914–15 Another General Election was required to take place before the end of 1915. The political parties had been making preparations for an election to take place and by July 1914, the following candidates had been selected;

- Liberal: Frederick Kellaway
- Unionist: Gerald de la Pryme Hargreaves
- Labour: Frederick Fox Riley

Kellaway

General election December 1910: Bedford
Party	Candidate	Votes	%	±%
Liberal	Frederick Kellaway	2,773	50.2	+1.7
Conservative	Walter Attenborough	2,754	49.8	−1.7
Majority		19	0.4	N/A
Turnout		5,527	91.2	−2.3
Liberal gain from Conservative		Swing	+1.7	

General election January 1910: Bedford
Party	Candidate	Votes	%	±%
Conservative	Walter Attenborough	2,919	51.5	+6.4
Liberal	Percy Barlow	2,750	48.5	−6.4
Majority		169	3.0	N/A
Turnout		5,669	93.5	+2.3
Conservative gain from Liberal		Swing		

Back to Elections

=== Elections in the 1900s ===
Barlow

General election 1906: Bedford
Party	Candidate	Votes	%	±%
Liberal	Percy Barlow	2,771	54.9	+8.3
Conservative	Charles Pym	2,278	45.1	−8.3
Majority		493	9.8	N/A
Turnout		5,049	91.2	+7.1
Registered electors		5,535		
Liberal gain from Conservative		Swing	+8.3	

Pym

General election 1900: Bedford
Party	Candidate	Votes	%	±%
Conservative	Charles Pym	2,115	53.4	+1.2
Liberal	Percy Barlow	1,848	46.6	−1.2
Majority		267	6.8	+2.4
Turnout		3,963	84.1	−6.5
Registered electors		4,711		
Conservative hold		Swing	+1.2	

Back to Elections

=== Elections in the 1890s ===
General election 1895: Bedford
Party	Candidate	Votes	%	±%
Conservative	Charles Pym	1,976	52.2	+3.8
Liberal	Samuel Whitbread	1,810	47.8	−3.8
Majority		166	4.4	N/A
Turnout		3,786	90.6	+1.0
Registered electors		4,179		
Conservative gain from Liberal		Swing	+3.8	

General election 1892: Bedford
Party	Candidate	Votes	%	±%
Liberal	Samuel Whitbread	1,850	51.6	+1.2
Conservative	Charles Pym	1,732	48.4	−1.2
Majority		118	3.2	+2.4
Turnout		3,582	89.6	+1.1
Registered electors		3,998		
Liberal hold		Swing	+1.2	

Back to Elections

=== Elections in the 1880s ===
General election 1886: Bedford
Party	Candidate	Votes	%	±%
Liberal	Samuel Whitbread	1,399	50.4	−4.9
Conservative	James Herman de Ricci	1,376	49.6	+4.9
Majority		23	0.8	−9.8
Turnout		2,775	88.5	−3.2
Registered electors		3,134		
Liberal hold		Swing	−4.9	

General election 1885: Bedford
Party	Candidate	Votes	%	±%
Liberal	Samuel Whitbread	1,588	55.3	−17.4
Conservative	James Herman de Ricci	1,286	44.7	+17.4
Majority		302	10.6	+3.3
Turnout		2,874	91.7	−2.6 (est)
Registered electors		3,134		
Liberal hold		Swing	−17.4	

General election 1880: Bedford (2 seats)
Party	Candidate	Votes	%	±%
Liberal	Samuel Whitbread	1,470	38.1	+1.7
Liberal	Charles Magniac	1,333	34.6	+2.9
Conservative	Frederick Polhill-Turner	1,053	27.3	−4.6
Majority		280	7.3	N/A
Turnout		2,455 (est)	94.3 (est)	−0.2
Registered electors		2,603		
Liberal hold		Swing	+2.0	
Liberal gain from Conservative		Swing	+2.6	

Back to Elections

=== Elections in the 1870s ===
General election 1874: Bedford (2 seats)
Party	Candidate	Votes	%	±%
Liberal	Samuel Whitbread	1,155	36.4	+3.8
Conservative	Frederick Polhill-Turner	1,010	31.9	−1.2
Liberal	Charles Magniac	1,006	31.7	−2.7
Turnout		2,091 (est)	94.5 (est)	+4.9
Registered electors		2,213		
Majority		145	4.5	−7.9
Liberal hold		Swing	+2.2	
Majority		4	0.2	N/A
Conservative gain from Liberal		Swing	+1.7	

Back to Elections

=== Elections in the 1860s ===
General election 1868: Bedford (2 seats)
Party	Candidate	Votes	%	±%
Liberal	James Howard	1,311	34.4	+9.7
Liberal	Samuel Whitbread	1,242	32.6	−9.1
Conservative	Frederick Polhill-Turner	769	20.2	+3.1
Conservative	Edward Loughlin O'Malley	491	12.9	−4.2
Majority		473	12.4	N/A
Turnout		1,907 (est)	89.6 (est)	+5.0
Registered electors		2,127		
Liberal hold		Swing	+7.0	
Liberal gain from Conservative		Swing	−6.1	

General election 1865: Bedford (2 seats)
Party	Candidate	Votes	%	±%
Liberal	Samuel Whitbread	574	41.1	+15.2
Conservative	William Stuart	476	34.1	−15.8
Liberal	Montague Chambers	345	24.7	+0.4
Turnout		936 (est)	84.6 (est)	−10.2
Registered electors		1,106		
Majority		98	7.0	+6.6
Liberal hold		Swing	+11.6	
Majority		131	9.4	+8.2
Conservative hold		Swing	−11.6	

Back to Elections

=== Elections in the 1850s ===
By-election, 28 June 1859: Bedford
Party	Candidate	Votes	%	±%
Liberal	Samuel Whitbread	441	53.1	+2.9
Conservative	Frederick Polhill-Turner	389	46.9	−2.9
Majority		52	6.2	+5.8
Turnout		830	89.5	−5.3
Registered electors		927		
Liberal hold		Swing	+2.9	

- Caused by Whitbread's appointment as a Civil Lord of the Admiralty.

General election 1859: Bedford (2 seats)
Party	Candidate	Votes	%	±%
Liberal	Samuel Whitbread	455	25.9	−5.5
Conservative	William Stuart	449	25.5	+12.4
Liberal	Thomas Barnard	427	24.3	−5.9
Conservative	Frederick Polhill-Turner	427	24.3	+11.2
Turnout		879 (est)	94.8 (est)	+12.9
Registered electors		927		
Majority		6	0.4	−3.7
Liberal hold		Swing	−8.7	
Majority		22	1.2	N/A
Conservative gain from Liberal		Swing	+9.1	

General election 1857: Bedford (2 seats)
Party	Candidate	Votes	%	±%
Whig	Samuel Whitbread	452	31.4	+13.3
Whig	Thomas Barnard	435	30.2	+12.1
Conservative	William Stuart	376	26.1	−16.8
Radical	Edward Tyrrell Smith	176	12.2	−8.7
Majority		59	4.1	N/A
Turnout		720 (est)	81.9 (est)	+15.7
Registered electors		879		
Whig hold		Swing	+10.9	
Whig gain from Conservative		Swing	+10.3	

- Smith was also supported by the Conservatives.

By-election, 6 December 1854: Bedford
Party	Candidate	Votes	%	±%
Conservative	William Stuart	422	56.0	+13.1
Radical	John Salusbury-Trelawny	331	44.0	+23.1
Majority		91	12.0	+5.2
Turnout		753	82.5	+16.3
Registered electors		913		
Conservative hold		Swing	−5.0	

- Caused by Stuart's death.

General election 1852: Bedford (2 seats)
Party	Candidate	Votes	%	±%
Conservative	Henry Stuart	517	42.9	−21.6
Whig	Samuel Whitbread	435	36.1	+0.6
Radical	Thomas Chisholm Anstey	252	20.9	N/A
Turnout		602 (est)	66.2 (est)	−14.4
Registered electors		910		
Majority		82	6.8	
Conservative hold		Swing	−11.0	
Majority		183	15.2	+10.4
Whig hold		Swing	+5.6	

Back to Elections

=== Elections in the 1840s ===
General election 1847: Bedford (2 seats)
Party	Candidate	Votes	%	±%
Whig	Harry Verney	453	35.5	+3.1
Conservative	Henry Stuart	432	33.8	+0.5
Conservative	Frederick Polhill	392	30.7	−3.6
Majority		61	4.8	N/A
Turnout		865 (est)	80.6 (est)	−17.3
Registered electors		1,073		
Whig gain from Conservative		Swing	+3.1	
Conservative hold		Swing	−0.5	

General election 1841: Bedford (2 seats)
Party	Candidate	Votes	%	±%
Conservative	Frederick Polhill	433	34.3	−1.7
Conservative	Henry Stuart	421	33.3	+1.0
Whig	William Henry Whitbread	410	32.4	+0.7
Majority		12	0.9	+0.3
Turnout		809	97.9	+29.5
Registered electors		1,073		
Conservative hold		Swing	−1.0	
Conservative hold		Swing	+0.3	

Back to Elections

=== Elections in the 1830s ===
General election 1837: Bedford (2 seats)
Party	Candidate	Votes	%	±%
Conservative	Frederick Polhill	467	36.0	+16.8
Conservative	Henry Stuart	419	32.3	+13.1
Whig	Samuel Crawley	412	31.7	−29.9
Majority		7	0.6	N/A
Turnout		815	68.4	+1.8
Registered electors		1,192		
Conservative hold		Swing	+15.9	
Conservative gain from Whig		Swing	+14.0	

- On petition, Stuart was unseated and Crawley was declared elected.

General election 1835: Bedford (2 seats)
Party	Candidate	Votes	%	±%
Conservative	Frederick Polhill	490	38.4	+7.6
Whig	Samuel Crawley	403	31.6	+0.6
Whig	William Henry Whitbread	383	30.0	−8.2
Majority		107	8.4	N/A
Turnout		834	66.6	+5.5
Registered electors		1,252		
Conservative gain from Whig		Swing	+7.6	
Whig hold		Swing	−1.6	

General election 1832: Bedford (2 seats)
Party	Candidate	Votes	%	±%
Whig	William Henry Whitbread	599	38.2	N/A
Whig	Samuel Crawley	486	31.0	N/A
Tory	Frederick Polhill	483	30.8	N/A
Majority		3	0.2	N/A
Turnout		961	61.1	N/A
Registered electors		1,572		
Whig hold		Swing	N/A	
Whig gain from Tory		Swing	N/A	

General election 1831: Bedford (2 seats)
Party	Candidate	Votes	%	±%
Whig	William Henry Whitbread	Unopposed		
Tory	Frederick Polhill	Unopposed		
Whig hold				
Tory hold				

General election 1830: Bedford (2 seats)
Party	Candidate	Votes	%	±%
Whig	William Henry Whitbread	515	34.4	N/A
Tory	Frederick Polhill	491	32.8	N/A
Whig	John Russell	490	32.8	N/A
Turnout		914		N/A
Majority		24	1.6	N/A
Whig hold		Swing	N/A	
Majority		1	0.0	N/A
Tory gain from Whig		Swing	N/A	

Back to Elections

=== Elections in the 1820s ===
- 1826: Lord George Russell and William Henry Whitbread (both Whig) elected unopposed
- 1820: Lord George Russell and William Henry Whitbread (both Whig) elected unopposed

Back to Elections

=== Elections in the 1810s ===
- 1818: Lord George Russell and William Henry Whitbread (both Whig) elected unopposed
- 1815: Following the death of Samuel Whitbread, Hon. William Waldegrave (Whig) elected unopposed
- 1812: Lord George Russell and Samuel Whitbread (both Whig) elected unopposed

Back to Elections

=== Elections in the 1800s ===
- 1807: William Lee Antonie and Samuel Whitbread (both Whig) elected unopposed
- 1806: William Lee Antonie and Samuel Whitbread (both Whig) elected unopposed
- 1802: William Lee Antonie and Samuel Whitbread (both Whig) elected unopposed

Back to Elections

=== Elections in the 1790s ===
- 1796: William MacDowall Colhoun (Tory) and Samuel Whitbread (Whig) elected unopposed

General election 1790: Bedford (2 seats)
Party	Candidate	Votes	%	±%
Tory	William MacDowall Colhoun	616	34.4	
Whig	Samuel Whitbread	601	33.6	
Tory	John Payne	574	32.0	
Majority		27	1.5	
Registered electors		c.1,200		
Tory hold		Swing		
Whig hold		Swing		

Back to Elections

== See also ==
- List of parliamentary constituencies in Bedfordshire
- Opinion polling in United Kingdom constituencies, 2010–15

== Sources ==
- Beatson, Robert (1807). A chronological register of both houses of the British Parliament, Volume II.
- F. W. S. Craig, "British Parliamentary Election Results 1832–1885" (2nd edition, Aldershot: Parliamentary Research Services, 1989)
- F W S Craig, "British Parliamentary Election Results 1918–1949" (Glasgow: Political Reference Publications, 1969)
- T. H. B. Oldfield, The Representative History of Great Britain and Ireland (London: Baldwin, Cradock & Joy, 1816)
- J Holladay Philbin, Parliamentary Representation 1832 – England and Wales (New Haven: Yale University Press, 1965)
- Edward Porritt and Annie G Porritt, The Unreformed House of Commons (Cambridge University Press, 1903)
- Henry Stooks Smith, "The Parliaments of England from 1715 to 1847" (2nd edition, edited by FWS Craig – Chichester: Parliamentary Reference Publications, 1973)
- Frederic A Youngs, jr, Guide to the Local Administrative Units of England, Vol I (London: Royal Historical Society, 1979)
- The Constitutional Year Book for 1913 (London: National Union of Conservative and Unionist Associations, 1913)
