= Bill Butler (Australian footballer) =

Australian rules footballer

Personal information
- Full name: Bill Butler
- Born: 31 July 1920
- Died: 15 September 1986 (aged 66)
- Original team: Cheltenham
- Height: 180 cm (5 ft 11 in)
- Weight: 77 kg (170 lb)

Playing career^{1}
Years	Club	Games (Goals)
1942–46	St Kilda	58 (0)
- ^{1} Playing statistics correct to the end of 1946.

Bill Butler (31 July 1920 – 15 September 1986) was a former Australian rules footballer who played with St Kilda in the Victorian Football League (VFL).
