= Alfred Machin (writer) =

Alfred George Fysh Machin (11 October 1888 – 15 December 1955) was an early twentieth-century British writer on the evolution of societies. Writing at the time when Darwin's theory of evolution was being reappraised in the light of the discovery of Gregor Mendel's work and advances in our knowledge of genetics, Machin tried to make sense of society in evolutionary terms.

In The Ascent of Man (a title he used long before Jacob Bronowski made his famous television series of the same name), he compares the ideas of Charles Darwin and Herbert Spencer in particular, with reference to Benjamin Kidd. The book is notable for his theory that the ills of society, and in particular mental illness, are caused by the increasing demands of society on the human organism which is adapted for life in small, unpoliced, communities of equals, rather than the constraining power structures of modern societies which leave man anything but free. This line of thought would later be expressed by Boris Sigis and Wilfred Trotter, and by Sigmund Freud in Civilisation and its Discontents

== Early career ==
Machin was articled to a solicitor in Hull in 1913. In 1921 he started a practice at Luton, Bedfordshire.

== Politics ==
Machin was a member of the Liberal party. He was elected to Bedfordshire County Council. He was Liberal candidate for Bedford at the 1929 General Election, when he finished second.

== Works ==
- Darwin's Theory Applied to Mankind (1937) Longmans Greene and Co, London
- The Ascent of Man by means of Natural Selection (1925) Longmans Greene and Co, London
- What is Man? Evolution's Answer
- A Substitute for Socialism, or, Short Studies in Progressive Economics (1926) Simpkin, Marshall, Hamilton, Kent and Co, London
- Politics in the World State (1938) World State Volunteers, Oxford
