= Frederick Kellaway =

British politician

The Right Honourable Frederick Kellaway PC
- Kellaway in 1921

Postmaster General
- In office 1 April 1921 – 31 October 1922
- Prime Minister: David Lloyd George
- Preceded by: Albert Illingworth
- Succeeded by: Neville Chamberlain

Secretary for Overseas Trade
- In office 2 April 1920 – 1 April 1921
- Prime Minister: David Lloyd George
- Preceded by: Hamar Greenwood
- Succeeded by: Philip Lloyd-Greame

Parliamentary Secretary to the Ministry of Munitions
- In office 14 December 1916 – 2 April 1920
- Prime Minister: David Lloyd George
- Preceded by: Christopher Addison
- Succeeded by: Position Vacant

Member of Parliament for Bedford
- In office 19 December 1910 – 15 November 1922
- Preceded by: Walter Attenborough
- Succeeded by: Richard Wells

Personal details
- Born: Frederick George Kellaway; 3 December 1870 Bristol, England, UK
- Died: 13 April 1933 (aged 62)
- Party: Liberal (Before 1916, 1923–1933)
- Other political affiliations: Coalition Liberal (1916–1922); National Liberal (1922–1923)
- Parent: William Hamley Kellaway (father)
- Occupation: Journalist

Frederick George Kellaway PC (3 December 1870 – 13 April 1933), often called F. G. Kellaway, was a Liberal Party politician in the United Kingdom, and member of parliament for Bedford from December 1910 to 1922.

== Early life and career ==
Kellaway's father, William Hamley Kellaway, had a joinery and picture frame business in Bristol, where Frederick was born. He became a journalist and then edited a number of local newspapers in Lewisham, before being elected to Parliament in 1910.

== Political career ==
Kellaway served as Parliamentary Secretary to the Ministry of Munitions 1916–1920; Secretary for Overseas Trade 1920–1921; and Postmaster General 1921–1922 in the Coalition Government 1916-1922.

He was appointed to the Privy Council in the 1920 Birthday Honours.

== Personal life and death ==
Following his political career, Kellaway became managing director of Marconi.

Kellaway died on 13 April 1933, aged 62, and is buried in St Mary's Churchyard, Tatsfield, Surrey.

Parliament of the United Kingdom
Preceded by Walter Attenborough	Member of Parliament for Bedford; December 1910–1922	Succeeded by Sir Richard Wells, 1st Baronet
Political offices
Preceded by Albert Illingworth	Postmaster General; 1921–1922	Succeeded by Neville Chamberlain
