= John Somers Dines =

English meteorologist

- Born: 18 June 1885; London
- Died: 15 May 1980 (aged 94)
- Scientific career
- Fields: Meteorology

John Somers Dines (18 June 1885 – 15 May 1980) was an English meteorologist.

Dines was born in the Cuckfield district, West Sussex, the son of meteorologist William Henry Dines and grandson of meteorologist George Dines. He graduated from Cambridge in 1906, with a degree in mathematics. He worked with his father, at Pyrton Hill, Oxfordshire, for a year, carrying out investigations of the upper atmosphere. In September 1907, Dines became employed by the Met Office.

In 1912, he became responsible for the new branch of the Met Office at South Farnborough, where investigations of wind structure for the Advisory Committee for Aeronautics were conducted. Accompanied by G.M.B. Dobson in autumn 1913, he visited six stations in Germany to see how they dealt with forecasting and aviation work. Dines had transferred to the Forecast Division by March 1916, and remained there for many years.

John Somers Dines was also the brother of Lewen Henry George Dines, also a meteorologist and engineer.
