= Bill Butler (running back) =

American football player (1950–2018)

No. 38
- Position: Running back

Personal information
- Born: August 12, 1950; Leaksville, North Carolina, U.S.
- Died: January 23, 2018 (aged 67); Manhattan, Kansas, U.S.
- Listed height: 6 ft 0 in (1.83 m)
- Listed weight: 218 lb (99 kg)

Career information
- High school: Escambia (Pensacola, Florida)
- College: Kansas State (1968–1971)
- NFL draft: 1972: 5th round, 111th overall pick

Career history
- New Orleans Saints (1972–1974); St. Louis Cardinals (1975)*
- * Offseason or practice squad member only

Awards and highlights
- Second-team All-Big Eight (1971)

Career NFL statistics
- Rushing attempts: 162
- Rushing yards: 655
- Total TDs: 5
- Stats at Pro Football Reference

William Edward Butler (August 12, 1950 – January 23, 2018) was an American professional football running back who played three seasons with the New Orleans Saints of the National Football League (NFL). He played college football at Kansas State and was selected by the Saints in the fifth round of the 1972 NFL draft.

== Early life and college ==
William Edward Butler was born on August 12, 1950, in Leaksville, North Carolina. He attended Escambia High School in Pensacola, Florida.

Butler played college football for the Kansas State Wildcats of Kansas State University. He was on the freshman team in 1968 and was a three-year letterman from 1969 to 1971. He rushed 19 times for 65 yards in 1969. In 1970, Butler recorded 127 carries for 497 yards and two touchdowns, and 12 receptions for 53 yards and one touchdown. As a senior in 1971, he rushed 204 times for 838 yards and 14 touchdowns while also catching 15 passes for 137 yards and two touchdowns. He was named second-team All-Big Eight Conference by the Associated Press for his performance during the 1971 season. Butler graduated from Kansas State in June 1973.

== Professional career ==
Butler was selected by the New Orleans Saints in the fifth round, with the 111th overall pick, of the 1972 NFL draft. He played in all 14 games, starting nine, for the Saints as a rookie in 1972, totaling 54 rushing attempts for 233 yards, and 25 catches for 226 yards and two touchdowns. He appeared in 13 games, starting ten, in 1973, rushing 87 times for 348 yards and one touchdown while also catching 19 passes for 125 yards and two touchdowns. Butler played in all 14 games, starting two, during the 1974 season, rushing 21 times for 74 yards while catching two passes for three yards.

On July 6, 1975, Butler was traded to the St. Louis Cardinals for an undisclosed draft pick, with the Saints stating he was traded because the team had too many running backs. On August 1, 1975, Butler announced his retirement from the NFL, citing a deteriorating hip bone. Butler said the Cardinals team doctor told him he would be crippled for life if he kept playing football.

== Personal life ==
After his NFL career, Butler worked McCall Pattern Company for 27 years before retiring in 2007. He founded Showroom Shine Auto Detailing in 2008. His son, Matt Butler, was a linebacker at Kansas State.

Butler died on January 23, 2018, in Manhattan, Kansas.
