= John Pigott =

English politician

John Pigott (c. 1550 – by 1627), of Gray's Inn, London and Edlesborough, Buckinghamshire, was an English politician.

He was a younger son of Francis Pigott of Stratton, Bedfordshire and educated at St John’s College, Cambridge and Gray's Inn, where he was called to the bar in 1581.

He was a member of the parliament of England for Bedford in 1589 and 1593 and for Bodmin in 1601.

He married twice and left 2 sons and 6 daughters.
