= Billy Butler (singer) =

American singer and songwriter (1945–2015)

- Birth name: William E. Butler
- Born: June 7, 1945; Chicago, Illinois, U.S.
- Died: March 31, 2015 (aged 69); Chicago, Illinois, U.S.
- Occupation(s): Singer, songwriter, guitarist
- Years active: 1963–1977

Billy Butler (born William E. Butler; June 7, 1945 – March 31, 2015) was an American soul singer and songwriter active in the 1960s and 1970s. He was born in Chicago, Illinois. His elder brother, Jerry, was also a singer and songwriter for whose band Billy played the guitar.

== Career ==
Billy Butler formed the vocal group the Enchanters while at high school. He first recorded for Okeh Records in 1963, and was produced initially by Curtis Mayfield and later by Carl Davis.

On early recordings he was backed by the Chanters, a renamed version of the Enchanters; other members were Errol Batts and Jesse Tillman. His first and biggest hit was 1965's "I Can't Work No Longer", which reached #6 on the U.S. Billboard R&B Singles chart and #60 on the Billboard Hot 100. The group disbanded in 1966, and after a minor solo hit with "The Right Track" he left Okeh. "The Right Track" is placed at number 11 in the Northern Soul Top 500

He later formed a new group, Infinity, with Batts, Larry Wade and Phyllis Knox. They had three minor R&B hits: "Get on the Case" (#41 R&B, Fountain Records, 1969), "I Don't Want to Lose You" (Memphis Records, #37 R&B, 1971), and "Hung Up on You" (Pride Records, #48 R&B, 1973). He also wrote songs for his brother, as well as for such musicians as Major Lance and Gene Chandler.

Billy Butler died in 2015, aged 69, in his native Chicago.

== Discography ==
=== Studio albums ===
- Right Track (1966)
- Hung Up on You (1973, with Infinity)
- Sugar Candy Lady (1977)

=== Singles ===
Year	Single	Peak chart positions	
Year	Single	US R&B	US Pop
1963	"Found True Love" / "Lady Love"	―	134
1964	"Gotta Get Away" / "I'm Just a Man"	38	101
1964	"Can't Live Without Her" / "My Heart Is Hurting"	―	130
1964	"Nevertheless" / "My Sweet Woman"	―	102
1965	"I Can't Work No Longer" / "Tomorrow Is Another Day"	6	60
1965	"(You Made Me Think) You Ain't Ready" / "I've Got a Feeling You're Gonna Be Sorry"	―	103
1966	"The Right Track" / "Boston Monkey"	24	—
1966	"Help Yourself" / "Sweet Darling"	—	—
1967	"Come Over to My Side" / "Love Grows Bitter"	―	―
1967	"I'll Bet You" /" Careless Heart"	―	―
1968	"Burning Touch of Love" / "Thank You Baby"	―	―
1969	"Get on the Case"	41	―
1970	"Soulation"	—	―
1971	"Free Yourself"	―	―
1971	"I Don't Want to Lose You"	37	―
1972	"Dip, Dip, I've Got My Hands Full"	―	―
1972	"Hung Up on You"	48	―
"—" denotes releases that did not chart or were not released.
