= Bill Butler (linebacker) =

American football player (born 1947)

No. 51
- Position: Linebacker

Personal information
- Born: August 4, 1947 (age 79); Los Angeles, California, U.S.
- Listed height: 6 ft 4 in (1.93 m)
- Listed weight: 226 lb (103 kg)

Career information
- High school: Reseda (CA)
- College: Valley State

Career history
- Denver Broncos (1970)

Career NFL statistics
- Games played: 14
- Stats at Pro Football Reference

William Marshall Butler (born August 4, 1947) is an American former professional football player who was a linebacker for the Denver Broncos of the National Football League (NFL). He played college football for the Valley State Matadors.

Butler was born in Los Angeles in 1947. He played highschool football at Reseda Highschool (1962-1965), college football at Pierce College (1966-1967) and San Fernando Valley State College (1968-1969), both located in the San Fernando Valley.He was a Junior College All-American at Pierce and won All California Collegiate Association honors in 1969.

In February 1970, Butler signed a professional football contract with the Denver Broncos of the National Football League (NFL). He appeared in a total of 14 NFL games for the Broncos.
