= William Boteler (died 1602) =

English politician

William Boteler (ca. 1540 – 1602) was an English politician.

He was a member (MP) of the parliament of England for Lyme Regis in 1563 and Bedford in 1586.
