= Alston (name) =

Origin
- Language: Old English
- Meaning: "noble stone", "elf stone", "old stone", "shrine stone", "temple stone"
- Region of origin: British Isles

Other names
- Variant forms: Allston, Alstone, Alliston, Elliston, Elystone

Alston is an English language surname with several derivations, and a male given name.

== Origins ==
The name may have evolved from the Middle English given name "Alstan", the prefix, Al- itself derived from different Old English words ("noble", "elf", "old", "shrine", "temple"), and the suffix -stan ("stone") derived from pre 7th century Old English. The oldest public record of this derivation is found in 1279 in Cambridgeshire. One branch of this name may have been taken from the manor of a Saxon Lord called Alstanus, who had his manor in Stambourne, North East Essex. It is known that he was still in possession of the manor after the Norman conquest, although as a tenant rather than owner, he held the land annexed against the King. There are a high density of families with the surname Alston and Alliston from around the Sudbury area, not far from Stambourne. In the 1224 feet of fines it is recorded that John son of Adam de Alliston sold land at Stanfeld (Stansfield) Suffolk. Stansfield is a few miles North of Stambourne. Both Stambourne and Stansfield may have taken their name from Æthelstan Half-King, Earl of East Anglia in the 930s.

Alston also evolved as a locational surname from villages named Alston (or Alstone) in Devonshire, Gloucestershire, Lancashire, Somerset, and Staffordshire. The oldest public records of the locational surname in these villages are from the period of 1221–1246. An alternate meaning is "from the old manor". The nearest locational name to Stambourne was Alston village in Suffolk near Trimley St Martin, recorded in the Domesday Book as Alteinestuna. The original meaning may have been Stone of Fire Farm (tuna). Alteines is a Gallic word meaning "stone of fire" and is associated with sorcery. The church was consolidated to Trimley St Martin in 1362.

The coat of arms containing the stars may have been taken as a variant of the coat of arms of the De Veres (Earls of Oxford) who were one of the most powerful post Norman East Anglian families and associated with early East Anglian Alstons.

Notable people with the name include:

== Surname ==
- Adrian Alston (born 1949), Australian soccer player
- Arthur Alston (1872–1954), British Anglican priest, Bishop of Middleton
- Arthur Hugh Garfit Alston (1902–1958), English botanist
- Ashanti Alston (born 1954), American anarchist activist, speaker, and writer
- Sir Beilby Alston (1868–1929), British diplomat
- Bill Alston (1884–1971), Scottish professional football player
- Blair Alston (born 1992), Scottish professional football player
- Charles Alston (botanist) (1683–1760), Scottish botanist
- Charles Alston (1907–1977), African-American painter, sculptor, illustrator, muralist, and teacher
- Damari Alston (born 2004), American football player
- Dave Alston (1846–1893), American baseball umpire
- Dean Alston (born 1950), Australian cartoonist
- Dell Alston (born 1952), American former baseball player
- Derrick Alston (born 1972), American basketball player
- Sir Edward Alston (1595–1669), president of the British College of Physicians
- Edward Richard Alston (1845–1881), Scottish zoologist
- Garvin Alston (born 1971), American baseball player
- Gerald Alston (born 1951), American R&B singer
- "Granny" Alston (1908–1985), English cricketer
- Jan Alston (born 1969), Canadian ice hockey player
- John Alston, 19th-century explorer of Australia
- Jon Alston (born 1983), American football player
- Joseph Alston (disambiguation)
- Julian Alston, Australian-American economist
- Kevin Alston (born 1988), American soccer player
- Kwaku Alston, American photographer
- Lee J. Alston (born 1951), American professor of economics
- Lemuel J. Alston (1760–1836), United States Congressman
- Lettie Alston (born 1953), African-American composer
- Louise Alston, Australian director and producer
- Lyneal Alston (born 1964), American football player
- Mack Alston (1947–2014), American football player
- Margaret Alston-Garnjost (1929–2019), British physicist
- Michael Alston, Australian disabled fencer
- Mike Alston (born 1985), American football player
- Nick Alston, British civil servant, later a Police and Crime Commissioner and health service manager
- O'Brien Alston (born 1965), American football player
- Ovie Alston (1905–1989), American jazz trumpeter, vocalist, and bandleader
- Peter Alston (c. 1765–1804), American counterfeiter and river pirate
- Philip Alston (counterfeiter), 18th-century American counterfeiter, frontier military leader
- Philip Alston, American law scholar and human rights practitioner
- Rafer Alston (born 1976), American basketball player
- Rex Alston (1901–1994), British radio sports commentator
- Richard Alston (disambiguation)
- Robert W. Alston (18th–19th centuries), American planter, grandfather of Robert Augustus Alston
- Robert Alston (born 1938), British diplomat
- Robin Carfrae Alston, British bibliographer
- Royal Alston (c. 1888–unknown), American college football coach
- Theodosia Burr Alston (1783–1813), daughter of U.S. Vice President Aaron Burr, disappeared at sea
- Thomas Alston (disambiguation)
- Tiffany Alston (born 1977), American politician
- Walter Alston (1911–1984), American baseball player and manager
- Wanda Alston (1959–2005), United States feminist activist and government official
- William Alston (disambiguation)
- Willis Alston (1769–1837), U.S. Congressman from North Carolina

== Given name ==
- Alston Bobb (born 1984), West Indian cricketer
- Alston G. Dayton (1857–1920), American politician
- Alston Scott Householder (1904–1993), American mathematician
- Alston Koch (born 1951), Sri Lankan singer-songwriter and record producer
- Alston May (1869–1940), British Anglican priest, Bishop of Northern Rhodesia
- Alston Purvis (born 1943), American graphic designer, artist, professor and author
- Alston Wise (1904–1984), Canadian ice hockey player
