= Aiston =

Aiston is a surname. Notable people with the surname include:

- George Aiston (1879–1943), Australian ethnographer and outback pioneer
- Mark Aiston, Australian sports journalist and sports presenter
- Sam Aiston (born 1976), English footballer

== See also ==
- Alston (name)
- Aston (name)
