= Sarah Byng Osborn =

English letter-writer

Sarah Osborn (née Byng, October 1693 – November 1775) was an English aristocrat whose letters give an insight into political and social life in the 18th century. Editions of her letters were published in 1890 and 1930.

Sarah Byng was born in October 1693 at Southill, Bedfordshire to George Byng, 1st Viscount Torrington, and his wife Margaret Master. In August 1710 she married John Osborn, 1st baronet of the Osborn baronets. They had six children, only one of whom survived past childhood.

On John’s death in 1719, Sarah became the guardian of her four-year-old son Danvers and responsible for managing his houses, lands, and tenants. Her legal and economic concerns during this time are outlined in her letters, as are details about local elections and domestic affairs at her house, Chicksands Priory.

When Danvers died in New York in the American colonies in 1753, Sarah became responsible for his two orphaned children and his estate until the elder, eleven-year-old George, reached his majority.

In 1757 she wrote letters attempting to prevent the execution of her brother, John Byng, who was court-martialled for his actions during the Battle of Minorca. He was executed on 14 March, "but nothing wanting in you that could be done," he wrote to Sarah.

Between 1766 and 1768 she wrote "vivid and useful" accounts of national politics to her younger grandson, John, including the 1768 general election.

Osborn died in November 1775.
