= Edward Montagu (died 1738) =

British Army officer and politician

Brigadier Edward Montagu or Montague (after 1684 – 2 August 1738) was a British Army officer and politician who sat in the House of Commons from 1722 to 1734.

Montagu was the second son of Edward Montagu of Horton, Northamptonshire and his wife Elizabeth Pelham, daughter of Sir John Pelham, 3rd Baronet, MP of Halland, Sussex. He was grandson of Henry Montagu, 1st Earl of Manchester and brother of George Montagu, 1st Earl of Halifax. He joined the army and was an ensign in the 1st Foot Guards in 1702 and then captain in the 2nd Dragoon Guards. In 1709 he became lieutenant-colonel in the Royal Dragoons. He married by licence dated 9 March 1709, Arabella Heath, widow of Robert Heath of Lewes, Sussex, and daughter of John Trevor of Trevalyn, Denbighshire and Plas Teg, Flintshire. He was taken prisoner at Brihuega in 1710 but became brevet colonel of the Dragoons in 1711. He was colonel of the 11th Foot from 1715 and commanded his regiment at Sheriffmuir in 1715.

Montagu was returned as Member of Parliament for Northampton on his family's interest at the 1722 British general election and supported the Government. In 1725 he was appointed lieutenant-governor at Fort St. Philip, in Menorca. He was returned again as MP for Northampton at the 1727 British general election. In 1733, he was appointed Governor of Kingston-upon-Hull. He voted for the Excise Bill, against the instructions of the Northampton corporation, and as a result, was defeated at the 1734 British general election.

Montagu died on 2 August 1738, leaving five sons and two daughters. His children included George Montagu and Sir Charles Montagu.

Parliament of Great Britain
Preceded by William Wykes; William Wilmer	Member of Parliament for Northampton; 1722–1734; With: William Wilmer 1722–1727; Hon. George Compton 1727–1734	Succeeded by Hon. George Compton; William Wilmer
Military offices
Preceded by John Hill	Colonel of Edward Montagu's Regiment of Foot; 1715–1738	Succeeded by Hon. Stephen Cornwallis
Preceded by The Earl of Cholmondeley	Governor of Kingston-upon-Hull; 1732–1738	Succeeded by The Duke of Marlborough
