= Sir John Osborn, 5th Baronet =

British politician

Sir John Osborn Bt
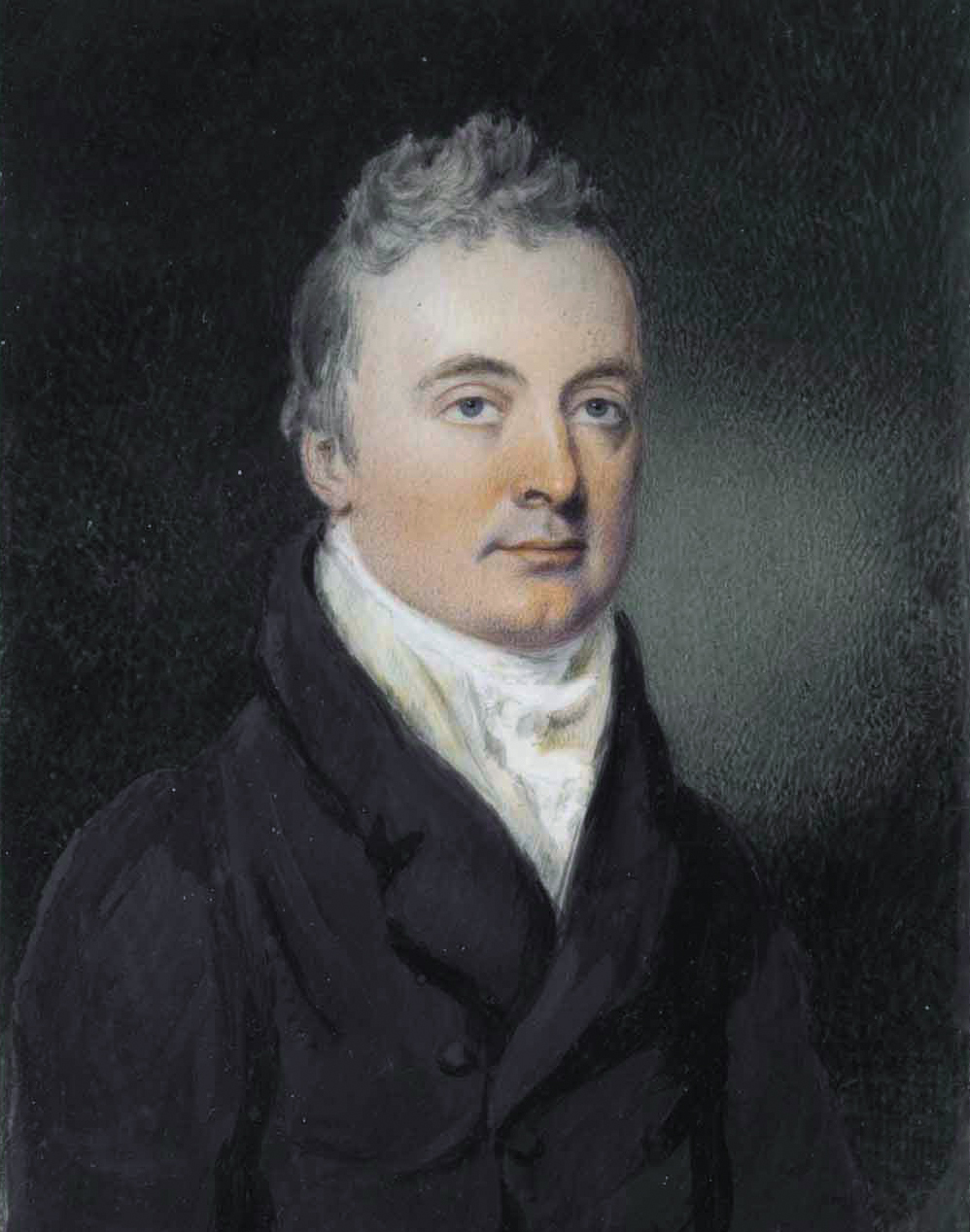
- c. 1810 portrait

Member of Parliament for Wigtown Burghs
- In office 1821–1824

Member of Parliament for Bedfordshire
- In office 1794–1800; 1801–1807; 1818–1820

Member of Parliament for Queenborough
- In office 1812–1818

Member of Parliament for Cockermouth
- In office 1807–1808

Personal details
- Born: 3 December 1772
- Died: 28 August 1848 (aged 75)
- Spouse: Frederica Davers
- Children: 8, including George
- Parent(s): George Osborn; Elizabeth Bannister
- Relatives: Danvers Osborn (grandfather)
- Education: Christ Church, Oxford
- Military career
- Rank: Colonel
- Units: Bedfordshire Yeomanry; British Volunteer Corps
- Commands: Bedfordshire Militia

Sir John Osborn, 5th Baronet (3 December 1772 – 28 August 1848) was a British politician.

== Early life ==
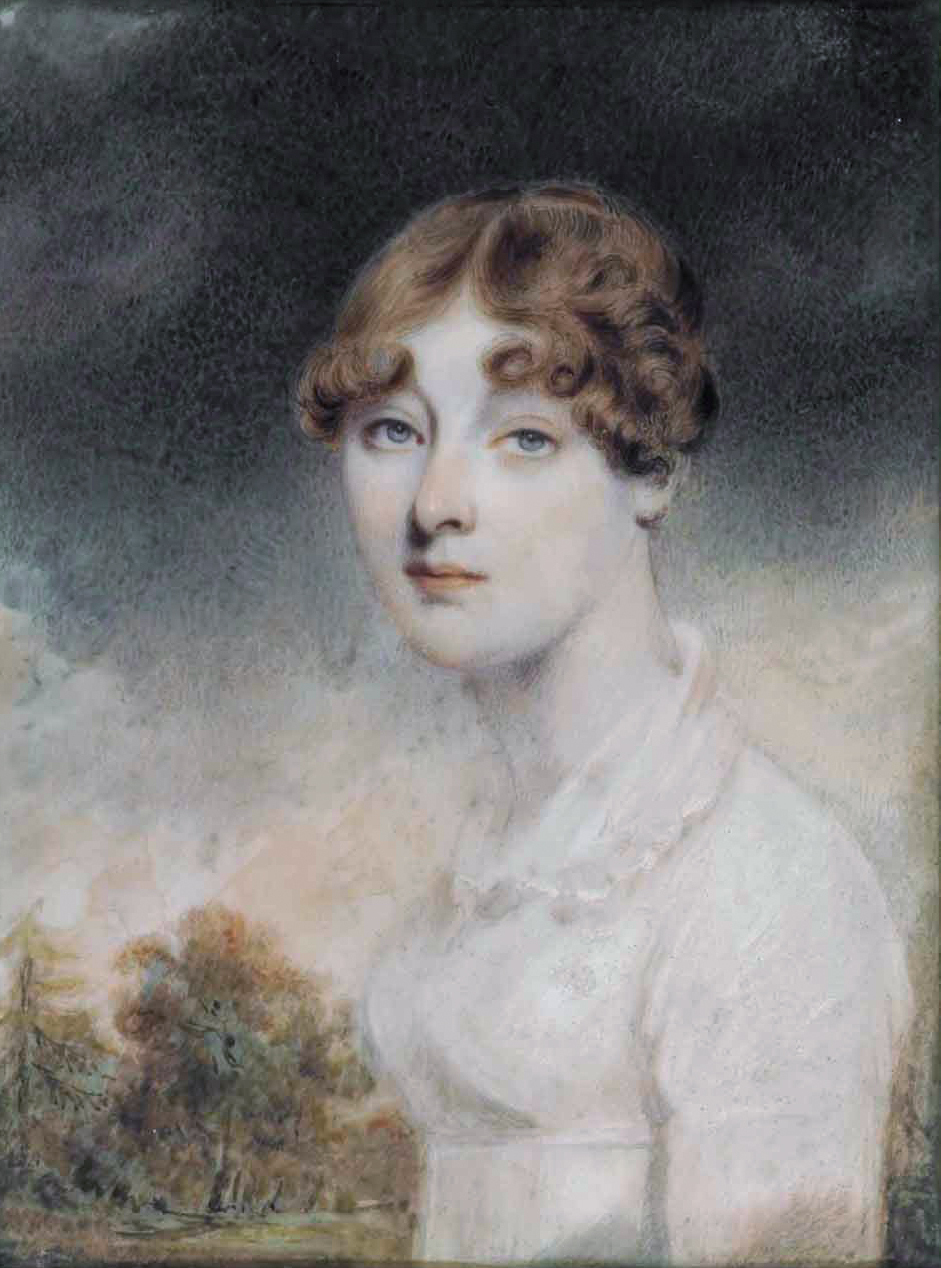
Osborn's wife Frederica, c. 1810

He was the only son of Sir George Osborn, 4th Baronet, who he succeeded in 1818, and Elizabeth Bannister. After his mother's death, his father married Lady Heneage Finch, the daughter of Daniel Finch, 8th Earl of Winchilsea. His father was a Groom of the Bedchamber to King George III.

His paternal grandparents were Sir Danvers Osborn, 3rd Baronet and Lady Mary Montagu (a daughter of the 1st Earl of Halifax). His maternal grandfather, John Bannister, was born in Antiqua and lived at Hill Street in Mayfair, London.

He was educated at Westminster School and Christ Church, Oxford.

== Career ==
Osborn was Member of Parliament for Bedfordshire, 1794–1807; for Cockermouth, 1807–1808; for Queenborough, 1812–1818; again for Bedfordshire, 1818–1820 and for the Wigtown Burghs 1821–1824. He served as a Lord of the Admiralty from 1812 to 1824 and as one of the Commissioners of Audit from 1824 until his death.

In 1797 he served as a Captain in the Bedfordshire Yeomanry and in 1803–05 in the Bedford Volunteers. On 12 January 1805 the Earl of Upper Ossory as Lord Lieutenant of Bedfordshire appointed him as Colonel of the Bedfordshire Militia after his predecessor was removed following a court of enquiry. As a young man Osborn's father had been an officer in the regiment when it was reformed in 1759, before joining the regular army and rising to the rank of General. In March 1805 Col Osborn joined the regiment and marched it to barracks at Berry Head near Brixham for its summer training, but thereafter direct command was usually exercised by the lieutenant-colonel. Osborn retained the command of the regiment until his death.

== Personal life ==
On 14 September 1809 at Westminster St James he married Augusta Frederica Louisa Valentina Davers, the illegitimate daughter of Sir Charles Davers, 6th Baronet. Together, they were the parents of at least five sons and three daughters, including:

- Elizabeth Heneage Osborn (1811–1871), who died unmarried.
- Louisa Anne Osborn (1812–1864), who married Rev. Brook Edward Bridges, son of Rev. Brook Edward Bridges (a son of Sir Brook Bridges, 3rd Baronet), in 1843.
- Sir George Robert Osborn, 6th Baronet (1813–1892), who married Lady Charlotte Kerr, daughter of Vice-Admiral Lord Mark Robert Kerr (the third son of 5th Marquess of Lothian) and Charlotte MacDonnell, suo jure 3rd Countess of Antrim (eldest daughter of the 1st Marquess of Antrim), in 1835.
- Charles Davers Osborn (1819–1846), who married Louisa Atherley, daughter of Rev. A. Atherley, in 1845.
- John Brownlow Osborn (1822–1853), who died unmarried.
- Montagu Francis Finch Osborn (1824–1895), a Reverend who was Canon of Newcastle; he married Catherine Barbara Marriott, daughter of John Marriott, in 1861.
- Danvers Henry Osborn (1827–1898), a Lt.-Col. in the East India Company Service; he married Annette Wilson, daughter of Thomas Watkins Wilson, in 1862.
- Frederica Lucy Osborn (1835–1906), who died unmarried.

Sir John died in 1848. He was succeeded in the baronetcy and family estates by his eldest son George Robert.

Parliament of Great Britain
Preceded by The Earl of Upper Ossory; Hon. St Andrew St John	Member of Parliament for Bedfordshire; 1794–1800; With: Hon. St Andrew St John	Succeeded by Parliament of the United Kingdom
Parliament of the United Kingdom
Preceded by Parliament of Great Britain	Member of Parliament for Bedfordshire; 1801–1807; With: Hon. St Andrew St John to 1806; Francis Pym from 1806	Succeeded by Richard Fitzpatrick; Francis Pym
Preceded by James Graham; John Lowther	Member of Parliament for Cockermouth; 1807–1808; With: James Graham	Succeeded by James Graham; Viscount Lowther
Preceded by Sir Robert Moorsom; John Charles Villiers	Member of Parliament for Queenborough; 1812–1818; With: Sir Robert Moorsom	Succeeded by Sir Robert Moorsom; Edmund Phipps
Preceded by Francis Pym; Marquess of Tavistock	Member of Parliament for Bedfordshire; 1818–1820; With: Marquess of Tavistock	Succeeded by Francis Pym; Marquess of Tavistock
Preceded by James Henry Keith Stewart	Member of Parliament for Wigtown Burghs; 1821–1824	Succeeded by Nicholas Conyngham Tindal
Baronetage of England
Preceded by George Osborn	Baronet (of Chicksands); 1818–1848	Succeeded by George Robert Osborn
