= Governor Osborn =

Governor Osborn or Osborne may refer to:

- Chase Osborn (1860–1949), 27th Governor of Michigan
- Sir Danvers Osborn, 3rd Baronet (1715–1753), Colonial Governor of New York Province in 1753
- Henry Osborn (Royal Navy officer) (1694–1771), Commodore-Governor of Newfoundland from 1729 to 1730
- Sidney Preston Osborn (1884–1948), 7th Governor of Arizona
- Thomas A. Osborn (1836–1898), 6th Governor of Kansas
- John Eugene Osborne (1858–1943), 3rd Governor of Wyoming
