= Sir Rowland Alston, 4th Baronet =

British politician (1679–1759)

Sir Rowland Alston, 4th Baronet (1679 – 2 January 1759) of Odell, Bedfordshire, was an English Whig politician who sat in the House of Commons from 1722 to 1741.

Alston was baptized on 6 September 1679, the fourth son of Sir Rowland Alston, 2nd Baronet, and his wife Temperance Crew, daughter of Thomas Crew, 2nd Baron Crew MP, of Stene. He succeeded to the baronetcy on the death of his elder brother Sir Thomas Alston, 3rd Baronet, MP, in December 1714. By 1719, he married Elizabeth Raynes, daughter of Captain Thomas Raynes.

Alston was elected as a Whig Member of Parliament (MP) for Bedfordshire at the contest at the 1722 British general election, and subsequently voted with the Administration in all recorded divisions. He was re-elected in contests in 1727 and 1734. He did not stand at the 1741 British general election.

Alston died aged 80 at St Marylebone, Middlesex on 2 January 1759 and was buried at Odell. He left two sons and five daughters and was succeeded in the baronetcy by his sons Thomas and then Rowland.

Parliament of Great Britain
Preceded by William Hillersden; John Cater	Member of Parliament for Bedfordshire; 1722 – 1741; With: Hon. Charles Leigh 1722–27; Hon. Pattee Byng 1727–33; Hon. Charles Leigh 1733–34; Hon. John Spencer 1734–35; Sir Roger Burgoyne, 6th Bt from 1735	Succeeded by Sir Roger Burgoyne, 6th Bt; Sir John Chester, 6th Bt
Baronetage of England
Preceded by Thomas Alston	Baronet (of Odell); 1714 – 1769	Succeeded by Thomas Alston
