= Thomas Alston =

Thomas Alston may refer to:

- Sir Thomas Alston, 1st Baronet (c. 1609–1678), High Sheriff of Bedfordshire
- Sir Thomas Alston, 3rd Baronet (1676–1714), MP for Bedford 1698–1701
- Sir Thomas Alston, 5th Baronet (1724–1774), MP for Bedfordshire 1747 and Bedford 1760
- Tom Alston (1926–1993), American professional baseball player
