= Allston (surname) =

- Language: English

Origin
- Language: Old English
- Origin: Æthelstan
- Derivation: æþele + stān
- Meaning: "noble stone"
- Region of origin: British Isles

Other names
- Variant form: Alston

Allston is an English language surname. Notable people with the surname include:

- Aaron Allston (1960–2014), American game designer and writer
- Johanna Allston (born 1986), Australian orienteer
- Robert Francis Withers Allston (1801–1864), Governor of South Carolina
- Washington Allston (1779–1843), American poet and influential painter
- Charles Allston Collins (1828–1873), British painter and writer

== See also ==
- Alston (name)
