= William Alston (disambiguation) =

William Alston (1921–2009) was an American philosopher.

William Alston may also refer to:

- William Alston (South Carolina) (1757–1839), South Carolina legislator, slave owner, planter, and horse breeder
- William J. Alston (1800–1876), attorney, politician, and planter from Alabama, U.S.
- Sir William Alston, 7th Baronet (1722–1801) of the Alston baronets
- Sir William Alston, 8th Baronet (1746–1819) of the Alston baronets
- Bill Alston (1884–1971), Scottish footballer
