= Sir George Osborn, 6th Baronet =

English politician

Sir George Osborn, Bt JP DL

High Sheriff of Bedfordshire
- In office 1857–1858
- Preceded by: Talbot Barnard
- Succeeded by: John Sambrook Crawley

Personal details
- Born: George Robert Osborn; 29 October 1813 London, England
- Died: 11 January 1892 (aged 78) Biggleswade, Bedfordshire, England
- Spouse(s): Lady Charlotte Kerr (m. 1835; died 1866) Mary Elizabeth Anne Sitwell (m. 1871; died 1892)
- Parent(s): Sir John Osborn, 5th Baronet; Frederica Davers

Sir George Robert Osborn, 6th Baronet (29 October 1813 – 11 January 1892), of Chicksands Priory in Bedfordshire, was an English politician.

== Early life ==
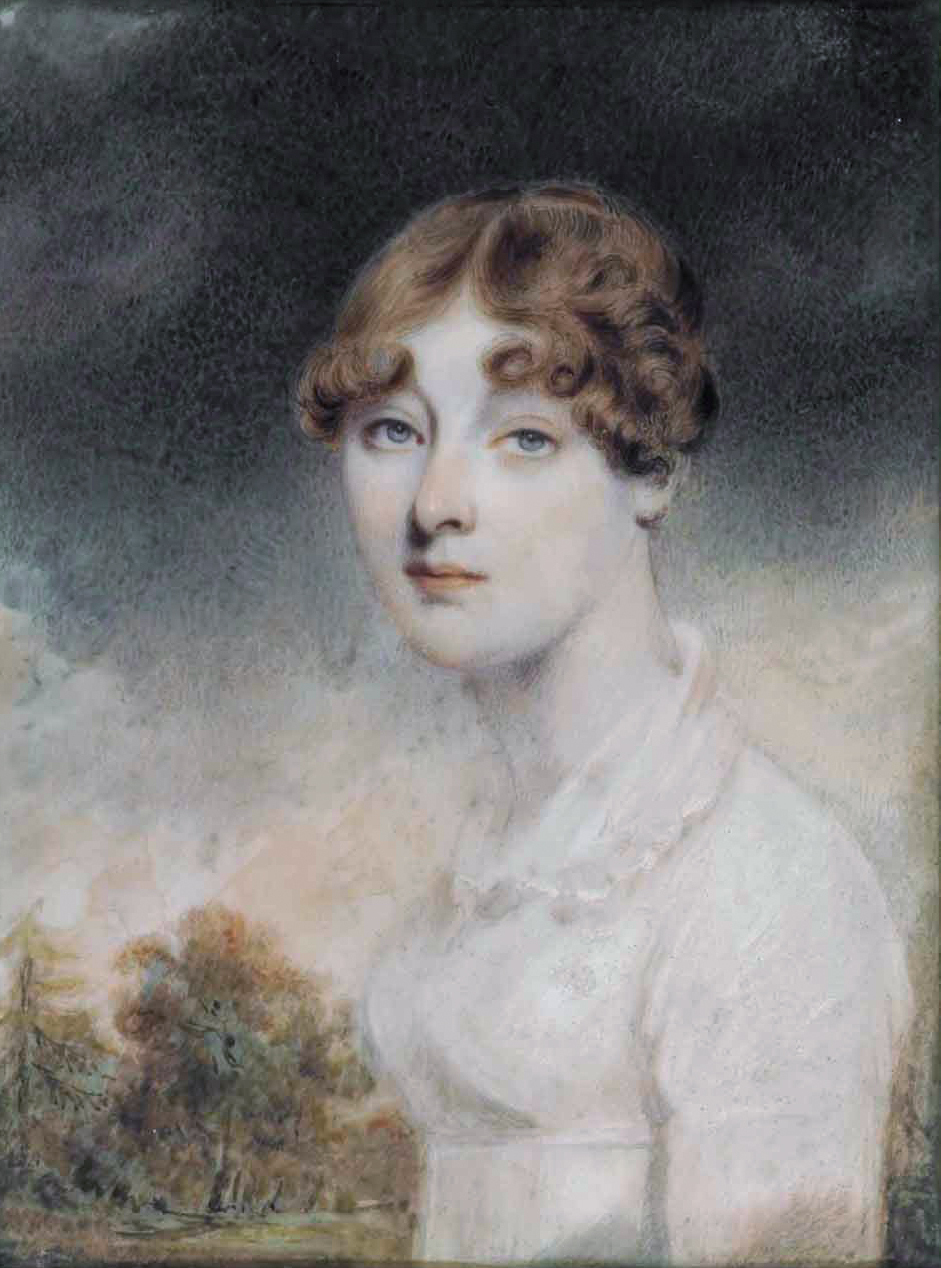
Osborn's mother Frederica, c. 1810

Osborn was born on 29 October 1813 in London, England. He was the son of Augusta Frederica Louisa Valentina Davers and Sir John Osborn, 5th Baronet, MP for Cockermouth, Queenborough, Bedfordshire, and Wigtown Burghs.

His father was the only son of Sir George Osborn, 4th Baronet, who fought in the American Revolutionary War, and Elizabeth Bannister (daughter of John Bannister). After his grandmother's death, his grandfather married Lady Heneage Finch, the daughter of Daniel Finch, 8th Earl of Winchilsea. His mother was one of three illegitimate daughter of Frances Treice and Sir Charles Davers, 6th Baronet, an MP for Bury St Edmunds and Weymouth.

== Career ==
Upon his father's death on 28 August 1848, he succeeded as the 6th Baronet Osborne, of Chicksands Priory. He served as a justice of the peace and a deputy lieutenant of Bedfordshire. He also served as High Sheriff of Bedfordshire in 1857.

== Personal life ==
On 22 August 1835, he married, firstly, Lady Charlotte Kerr, daughter of Vice-Admiral Lord Mark Kerr (the third son of William Kerr, 5th Marquess of Lothian, and Elizabeth Fortescue) and Charlotte MacDonnell, suo jure 3rd Countess of Antrim (eldest daughter of Randal MacDonnell, 1st Marquess of Antrim). Before Lady Charlotte's death in 1866, they were the parents of:

- Charlotte Frederica Caroline Osborn (c. 1836–1908), who married Gen, Sir Edward Harris Greathed, son of Edward Greathed and Mary Elizabeth Glyn, in 1869.
- Laura Elizabeth Osborn (1838–1858), who died unmarried at age 20.
- Henry John Robert Osborn (1839–1889), a lieutenant in the 1st Life Guards; he married Emily St Quintin, daughter of Thomas St Quintin, in 1866.
- Francis Mark Seymour Osborn (1841–1908), a captain in the Royal Navy who died unmarried.
- George Montague Osborn (1843–1910), a reverend who was Rector at Campton, Bedfordshire; he married Hon. Charlotte Jane Kenyon, daughter of Lloyd Kenyon, 3rd Baron Kenyon, and Hon. Georgiana de Grey (a daughter of the 4th Baron Walsingham), in 1876.
- Mark Charles Davers Osborn (1845–1928), a lieutenant in the Royal Navy; he married Mary Courtenay Platt, daughter of William Platt, in 1872. After her death in 1884, he married in 1885 Mary Anne Bell Fulton, daughter of W. B. Fulton. She died in Bedford on 2 February 1903. After her death, he married Clare Harriet (née Knight), daughter of John Knight and widow of the Rev. Henry Gordon Cranmer, in 1904.
- Mary Louisa Osborn (1847–1920), who died unmarried.
- Arthur Edward Danvers Osborn (1849–1888), a reverend who was the vicar at Haynes, Bedfordshire; he died unmarried.
- Emily Fanny Dorothy Osborn (1851–1925), who married her cousin, Hon. Mark Henry Horace McDonnell, son of Mark McDonnell, 5th Earl of Antrim, in 1892.
- Harriet Jane Osborn (1852–1882), who married Francis Basil Pulteney, son of Rev. Richard Thomas Pulteney and Emma Dalison, in 1881.
- Edith Caroline Agnes Osborn (1854–1914), who died unmarried.

After her death, he married Mary Elizabeth Anne Sitwell (1822–1909), daughter of Sir George Sitwell, 2nd Baronet, and Susan Murray Tait (a daughter of Crauford Tait), on 20 May 1871. Mary's uncle was Archibald Campbell Tait, the Archbishop of Canterbury.

Sir George died on 11 January 1892 at age 78 at Biggleswade, Bedfordshire, England. As his eldest son had died in a collision in the English Channel between the RMT paddle steamers Princesse Henriette and Comtesse de Flandre in 1889, he was succeeded in the baronetcy by his grandson, Algernon Osborn.

Baronetage of England
Preceded by John Osborn	Baronet of Chicksands; 1848–1892	Succeeded by Algernon Osborn
