= Poddy =

Poddy may refer to:

- George Aiston (1879–1943), Australian ethnographer and outback pioneer
- Bert Davie (1899-1979), Australian cricketer and Australian rules footballer
- Arthur Hiskins (1886–1971), Australian rules footballer
- Podkayne "Poddy" Fries, title character of the science fiction novel Podkayne of Mars by Robert A. Heinlein
- Poddy, an orphan calf in British English
