= Charles Leigh (1686–1749) =

British politician

Charles Leigh (1686–1749) of Leighton Buzzard, Bedfordshire was a British politician who sat in the House of Commons between 1710 and 1734.

Leigh was baptized on 28 March 1686, the third, but second surviving son of Thomas Leigh, 2nd Baron Leigh of Stoneleigh Abbey, Warwickshire and his second wife Eleanor Watson, daughter of Edward Watson, 2nd Baron Rockingham. He was admitted at Inner Temple in 1701 and matriculated at Balliol College, Oxford on 18 May 1702, aged 16. In 1704, he succeeded his uncle Hon. Charles Leigh and inherited the Leighton Buzzard estates in Bedfordshire. He married. Lady Barbara Lumley daughter of Richard Lumley, 1st Earl of Scarbrough in 1716.

Leigh's father died in November 1710, and he stood at a by-election at Warwick on 13 December 1710 against the Greville interest. He was elected Member of Parliament in a contest and was classed as a Tory and named as a ‘worthy patriot’ who helped expose the mismanagements of the previous Whig government. He offended some Tories for abstaining on 24 January 1712 when the House voted on the motion censuring the Duke of Marlborough for his ‘unwarrantable and illegal’ acceptance of money from bread contractors. As a result, he damaged his political standing at Warwick. He also voted 'whimsically' on 18 June 1713 against the French commerce bill. At the 1713 general election, he expected not to be put forward for Warwick, but made no attempt to find another constituency. In the following year his maternal uncle, Hon. Thomas Watson Wentworth, returned him for Higham Ferrers at a by-election on 12 March 1714 and he was returned again at the 1715 general election.

Having been a Tory who might often vote Whig, Leigh became a strong opponent of Walpole's administration and from 1715, voted against the Government in all recorded divisions. At the 1722 general election, he changed his seat to Bedfordshire. In 1725, he voted against the restoration of Bolingbroke's estates with four other Tories. He did not stand at the 1727 general election, but was returned for Bedfordshire at a by-election on 16 February 1733. He voted against the Administration on the Excise Bill in 1733, and the repeal of the Septennial Act, in 1734. He was defeated at the 1734 general election and not stand again.

Leigh died without issue on 28 July 1749.

Parliament of Great Britain
Preceded by Francis Greville; Dodington Greville	Member of Parliament for Warwick; 1710–1713; With: Dodington Greville	Succeeded by William Colemore; Dodington Greville
Preceded by Thomas Watson Wentworth	Member of Parliament for Higham Ferrers; 1714–1722	Succeeded by Thomas Watson Wentworth
Preceded by William Hillersden; John Cater	Member of Parliament for Bedfordshire; 1722–1727; With: Sir Rowland Alston, 4th Bt	Succeeded by Hon. Pattee Byng; Sir Rowland Alston, 4th Bt
Preceded by Hon. Pattee Byng; Sir Rowland Alston, 4th Bt	Member of Parliament for Bedfordshire; 1733–1734; With: Sir Rowland Alston, 4th Bt	Succeeded by Hon. John Spencer; Sir Rowland Alston, 4th Bt
