= Henry Osborn (Royal Navy officer) =

Royal Navy officer and colonial administrator (1694–1771)

Admiral Henry Osborn
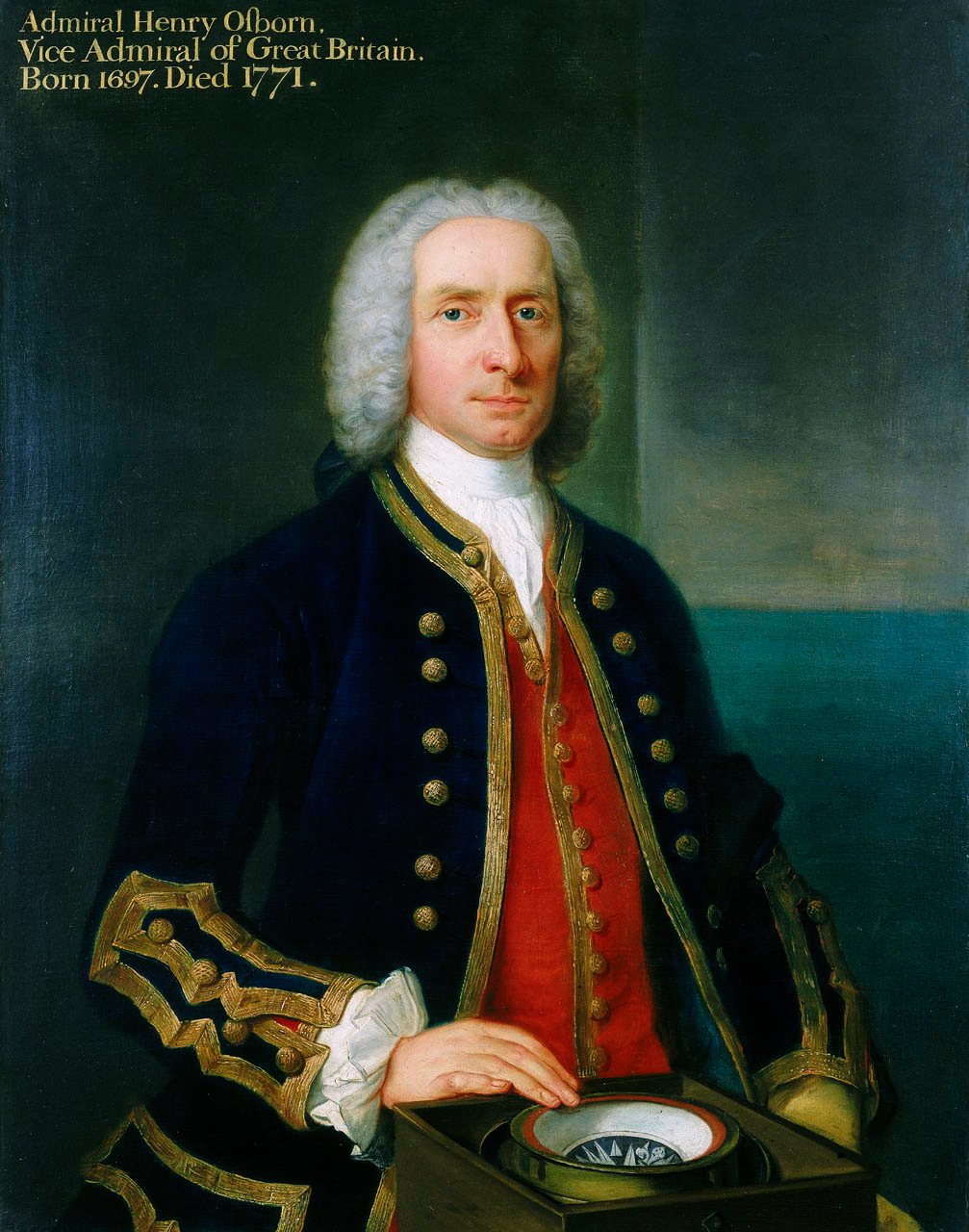
- Portrait by Claude Arnulphy, 1743–1744
- Born: 1694; Campton, Bedfordshire
- Died: 4 February 1771; London, England
- Military career
- Allegiance: Great Britain
- Branch: Royal Navy
- Service years: 1710–1771
- Rank: Admiral of the Blue
- Commands: HMS Weazle; HMS Squirrel; Newfoundland station HMS Portland; HMS Salisbury; HMS Prince of Orange; HMS Chichester; HMS Princess Caroline; Nore Command; Leeward Islands Station; Portsmouth Command; Mediterranean Fleet
- Conflicts: War of the Spanish Succession; War of the Quadruple Alliance; Battle of Cape Passaro; War of the Austrian Succession; Battle of Toulon; Seven Years' War; Battle of Cartagena

Viceregal styles of Henry Osborn
- Reference style: His Excellency
- Spoken style: Your Excellency

Admiral of the Blue Henry Osborn (1694 – 4 February 1771) was a Royal Navy officer and colonial administrator who served as Commodore-Governor of Newfoundland. He was a younger son of Sir John Osborn, 2nd Baronet.

== Naval career ==
Osborn joined the Royal Navy as a volunteer in 1710. He was promoted lieutenant in 1717, and his first command was HMS Squirrel in 1728.

On 14 May 1729, Osborn was appointed the first commodore-governor of Newfoundland, when Lord Vere Beauclerk, the naval commander of Newfoundland had declined. He visited all of the notable places on the island and divided it into six districts. Within each of the districts he appointed magistrates and constables. He served as Port Admiral at Portsmouth from 1756 to 1757.

In 1757, he was promoted Admiral of the Blue and appointed Commander-in-Chief, Mediterranean Fleet.

=== Battle of Cartagena ===
In late 1757 Osborn besieged the neutral port of Cartagena in Spain where a French squadron designed to go to the relief of Louisbourg had taken shelter. While there he attacked a small French squadron under Michel-Ange Duquesne de Menneville which was coming to the aid of the trapped force. Two French ships were captured, including Duquesne's flagship and it indirectly led to the successful British capture of Louisbourg later that year. The battle helped to restore the Royal Navy's reputation following the failed attempt to relieve Minorca two years earlier which had led to Admiral Byng's execution.

On 1 January 1763, he received the honorific post of Vice-Admiral of Great Britain. He entered Parliament in late 1758 for Bedfordshire in a by-election, sitting until 1761.

== See also ==
- List of people from Newfoundland and Labrador

== Notes ==
Parliament of Great Britain
Preceded by Thomas Alston; The Earl of Upper Ossory	Member of Parliament for Bedfordshire; 1758–1761; With: Sir Thomas Alston, Bt	Succeeded by Marquess of Tavistock; Robert Henley-Ongley
Political offices
Preceded by Philippe Pastour de Costebelle	Commodore Governor of Newfoundland; 1729–1730	Succeeded by George Clinton
Military offices
Preceded by Sir Edward Hawke	Commander-in-Chief, Portsmouth; 1756–1757	Succeeded by Sir Francis Holburne
Honorary titles
Preceded by The Lord Anson	Vice-Admiral of Great Britain; 1763–1765	Succeeded by Edward Hawke
