= Sir Roger Burgoyne, 6th Baronet =

English landowner and Whig politician

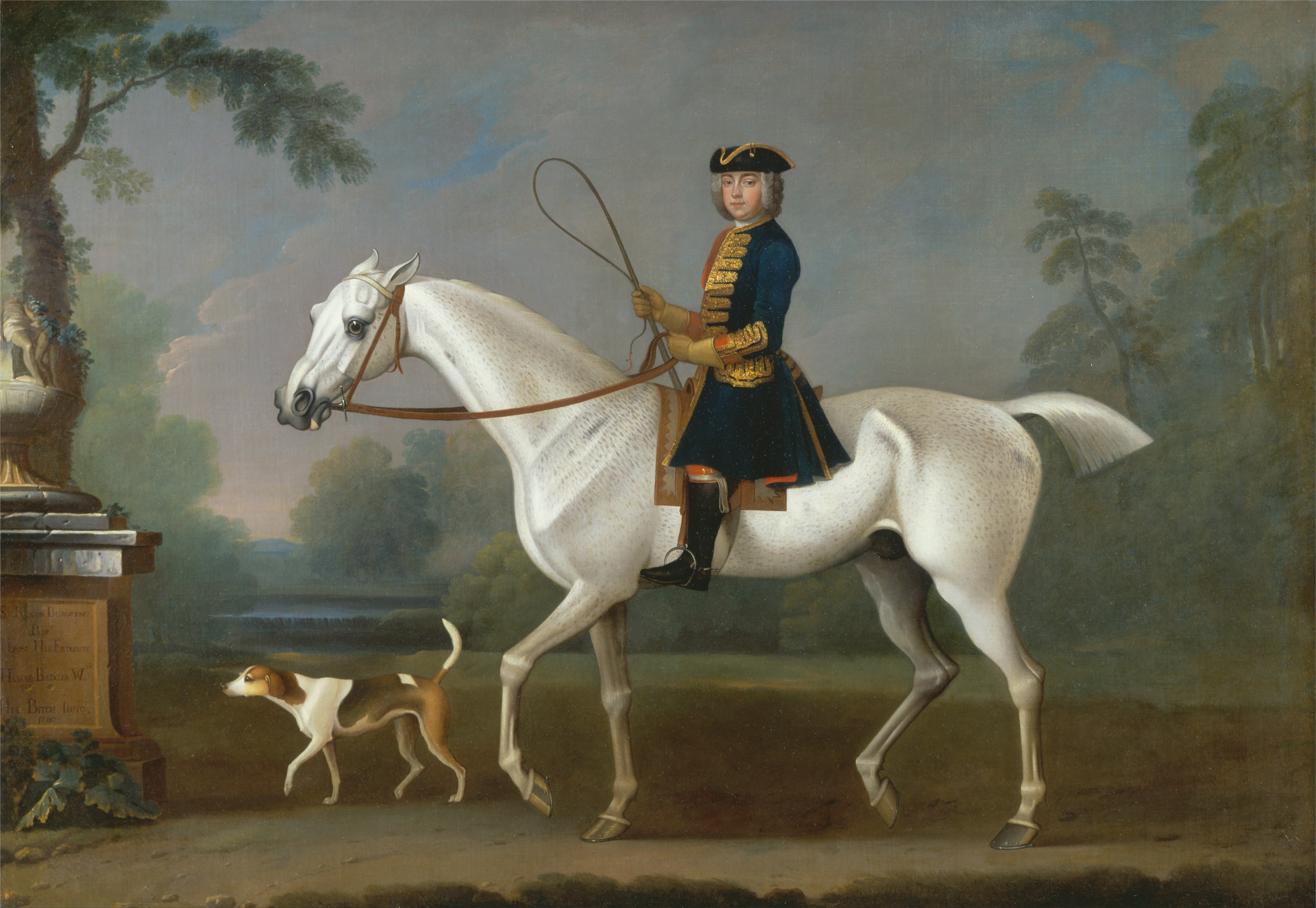
- Sir Roger Burgoyne riding his horse Badger, portrait by James Seymour
- Born: 1710
- Died: 31 December 1780 (aged 69–70)
- Occupation: Politician
- Spouse(s): Lady Frances Montagu
- Children: Sir John Burgoyne, 7th Baronet
- Parent(s): Sir Roger Burgoyne, 4th Bt.; Constance Middleton

Sir Roger Burgoyne, 6th Baronet (1710 – 1780), of Sutton, Bedfordshire, was an English landowner and Whig politician who sat in the House of Commons from 1735 to 1747.

Burgoyne was baptized on 23 April 1710, the second son of Sir Roger Burgoyne, 4th Baronet, of Wroxall, Warwickshire and Sutton, Bedfordshire, and his wife Constance Middleton, daughter of Sir Thomas Middleton, MP of Stanstead Mountfitchet, Essex. He succeeded his elder brother to the baronetcy in July 1711. He was educated at Eton College in 1725 and was at Trinity Hall, Cambridge from 1727 to 1730.

Burgoyne was returned as a Whig Member of Parliament for Bedfordshire at a by-election on 26 February 1735. He supported the Administration until 1739, when he voted against the Spanish Convention. He then voted generally with the Opposition. He was returned as MP for Bedfordshire at the 1741 British general election. He then changed sides, probably under the influence of his brother-in-law, Lord Halifax, and was classed as a ‘New Ally’ in 1746. He did not stand at the 1747 British general election.

Burgoyne married Lady Frances Montagu, daughter of George Montagu, 1st Earl of Halifax, MP, on 1 January 1739. He was appointed Commissioner of the Victualling Board in 1752 and occupied the post for the rest of his life. He died on 31 December 1780, leaving two sons and three daughters, including:

- Sir John Burgoyne, 7th Baronet (1739–1785)
- Frances Burgoyne (b. 15 September 1740)

Parliament of Great Britain
Preceded by Hon. John Spencer; Sir Rowland Alston, 4th Bt	Member of Parliament for Bedfordshire; 1735–1747; With: Sir Rowland Alston, 4th Bt; Sir John Chester, 6th Bt	Succeeded by Sir Danvers Osborn, 3rd Bt; Thomas Alston
Baronetage of England
Preceded by Sir John Burgoyne, 5th Baronet	Baronet (of Sutton); 1716-1780	Succeeded by Sir John Burgoyne, 7th Baronet
