= Joseph Alston (disambiguation) =

Joseph Alston (1779–1816) was Governor of South Carolina.

Joseph Alston may also refer to:

- Joseph Cameron Alston (1926–2008), American badminton player
- Sir Joseph Alston, 1st Baronet (died 1688), of the Alston baronets
- Sir Joseph Alston, 2nd Baronet (c. 1640–1689), High Sheriff of Buckinghamshire, of the Alston baronets
- Sir Joseph Alston, 3rd Baronet (c. 1665–1716), High Sheriff of Buckinghamshire, of the Alston baronets
- Sir Joseph Alston, 4th Baronet (1691–1718), of the Alston baronets
