= George Montagu (18th century politician) =

English politician (1713–1780)

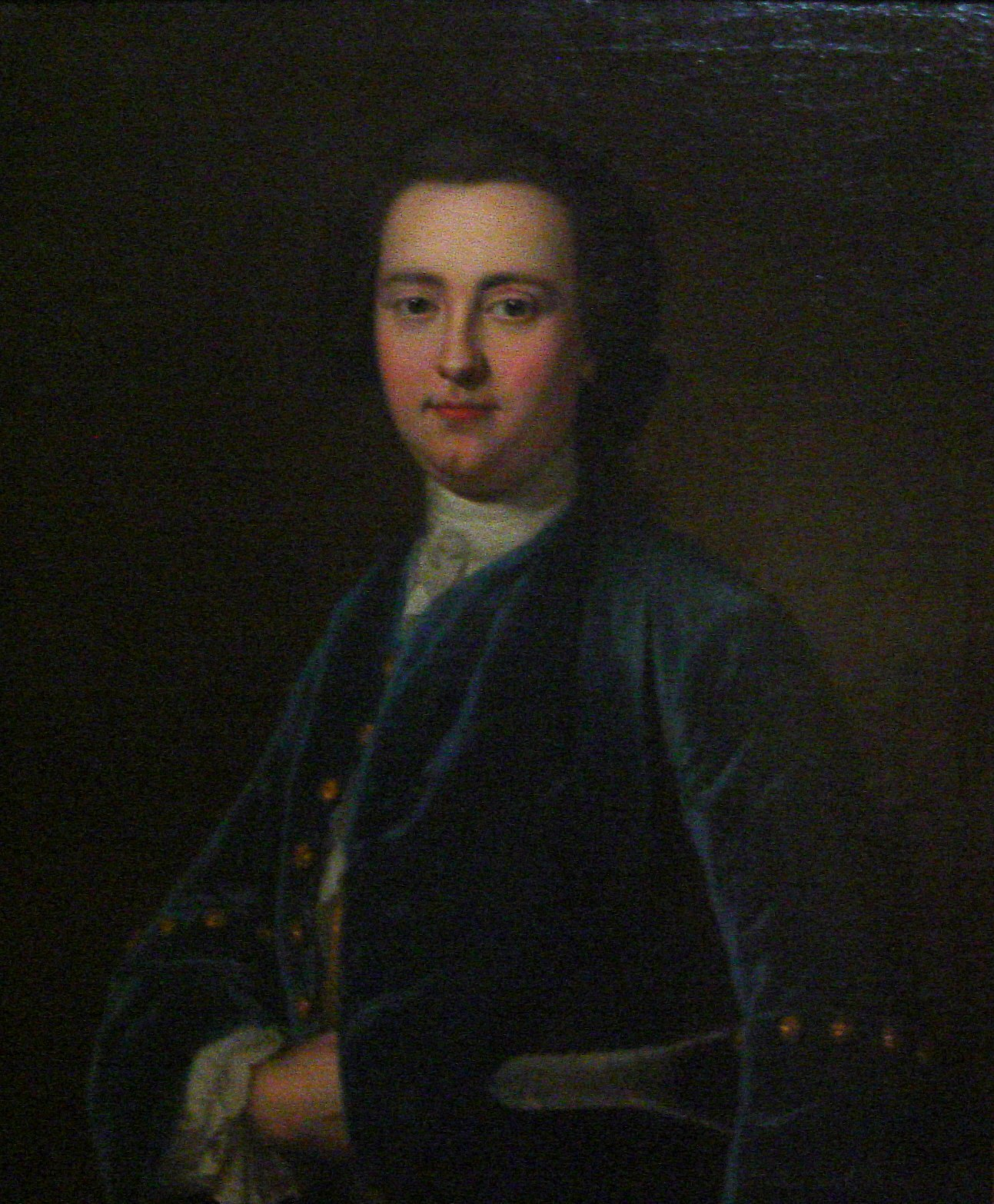
Portrait of George Montagu by John Giles Eccardt after Jean-Baptiste van Loo

George Montagu (c.1713 – 9 May 1780) was an English politician who sat in the House of Commons. He is known for his correspondence with Horace Walpole.

George Montagu was the eldest son of Brigadier Edward Montagu, of the influential House of Montagu. George became a friend of Horace Walpole when they attended Eton College and their friendship lasted until about 1770. Modern scholars debate the extent of the sexual element to their intimacy.

Montagu was returned unopposed for the Whigs as a Member of Parliament for Northampton at a 1744 by-election caused by the death of William Wilmer. He sat until the 1754 general election.

Family connections secured Montagu various near-sinecure positions. He was Irish Black Rod from 1761 to 1763 while his cousin, the 2nd Earl of Halifax, was Lord Lieutenant. A brief memoir of his time in Ireland was published in the Dublin University Magazine in 1854. He was private secretary to Lord North as Chancellor of the Exchequer from the latter's appointment in 1767 until his own death. Lady Beaulieu secured him the post of Deputy Ranger of Rockingham Forest in 1766, prompting Walpole to call him "a Robin Hood reformé".

Harold Herbert Williams said that Montagu "idled and dozed agreeably through life". According to Walpole, Montagu had dropped him after 1770 "partly from politics and partly from caprice, for we never had any quarrel— but he was grown an excessive humourist, and had shed almost all his friends as well as me". Walpole's letters to him were first published in 1818, and, together with Montagu's replies, they fill two volumes of the Yale edition of Walpole's correspondence. According to the Walpole scholar Wilmarth Sheldon Lewis (1895–1979), Walpole's letters to Montagu are "of more general interest than are those written to any other correspondent".

== Sources ==
- Walpole, Horace; Montagu, George (1941). Brown, Ralph S.; Lewis, W. S. (eds.). Horace Walpole's correspondence with George Montagu [2 vols]. The Yale Edition of Horace Walpole’s Correspondence. Vol. 9–10. New Haven: Yale University Press.
