= William Wilmer =

British landowner and Whig politician

William Wilmer (c. 1692–1744), of Sywell Hall, Northamptonshire, was a British landowner and Whig politician who sat in the House of Commons between 1715 and 1744.

Wilmer was the eldest son of William Wilmer of Sywell and his wife Dinah Lancaster. In 1706 he succeeded his father to Sywell Hall, where family had been seated since the beginning of the seventeenth century. He matriculated at Queen’s College, Oxford on 16 May 1711, aged 18. He married Lady Mary Bennet, daughter of Charles Bennet, 1st Earl of Tankerville, on 5 August 1720.

Wilmer was returned as Whig Member of Parliament for Northampton at a by-election on 7 June 1715 by Lord Halifax who had vacated the seat on succeeding to a peerage. Wilmer voted with the Government on the septennial bill and the repeal of the Occasional Conformity and Schism Acts, but against them on the Peerage Bill. He was caught up in a system of electoral deals and compromises between the parties, and was returned in a contest at the 1722 British general election, in spite of efforts to get Lord Halifax to place him elsewhere. At the 1727 British general election he was not put up because of machinations between Lord Halifax, and Lord Northampton, so he stood on his own account, but was defeated. By the 1734 Lords Halifax and Northampton had fallen out, and Wilmer stood with Edward Montagu against George Compton, This time Wilmer was returned with Compton. He voted with the Government on the Convention in 1739. He was returned with Compton unopposed at the 1741 British general election. He voted with the government on the chairman of the elections committee in 1741, and on the Hanoverians in 1742.

Wilmer died on 3 April 1744. He and his wife had a daughter and three sons, of whom Bennet, inherited the estate but died in the same year, leaving it to his aunt Dinah Wilmer.

Parliament of Great Britain
| Preceded by George Montagu; William Wykes | Member of Parliament for Northampton; 1715–1727; With: William Wykes 1715-1722; Edward Montagu 1722-1727 | Succeeded by Hon. George Compton; Edward Montagu |
| Preceded by Hon. George Compton; Edward Montagu | Member of Parliament for Northampton; 1734– 1744; With: Hon. George Compton | Succeeded by Hon. George Compton; George Montagu |
