= George Compton, 6th Earl of Northampton =

British politician

George Compton, 6th Earl of Northampton (1692 – 6 December 1758), known as the Honourable George Compton until 1754, was a British politician who sat in the House of Commons from 1727 to 1754.

Compton was the second son of George Compton, 4th Earl of Northampton, and Jane, daughter of Sir Stephen Fox of Farley, Wiltshire. Prime Minister Spencer Compton, 1st Earl of Wilmington, was his uncle and Henry Fox, 1st Baron Holland, his first cousin. He was educated at Eton College from 1706 to 1707 and then joined the army. He was cornet in the Royal Horse Guards in 1707 and guidon and major in the 2nd Life Guards in 1713. He was on the reserve list in 1715.

Compton was returned as Member of Parliament for Tamworth at a by-election in January 1727. At the 1727 British general election, he was returned as MP for Northampton. He served briefly as a Lord of the Treasury in 1742. In 1754, he succeeded his elder brother in the earldom and vacated his seat in the House of Commons to enter the House of Lords.

Lord Northampton died childless in December 1758 and was succeeded in his titles by his nephew Charles.

== Notes ==
Parliament of Great Britain
Preceded by Francis Willoughby; Richard Swinfen	Member of Parliament for Tamworth; January 1727 – August 1727; With: Francis Willoughby	Succeeded by The Earl of Inchiquin; Thomas Willoughby
Preceded by William Wilmer; Edward Montagu	Member of Parliament for Northampton; 1727–1754; With: William Wilmer 1734–44; George Montagu 1744–54; Charles Montagu 1754	Succeeded by Charles Montagu; Charles Compton
Peerage of Great Britain
Preceded by James Compton	Earl of Northampton; 5th creation 1754–1758	Succeeded by Charles Compton
