= Sir Thomas Alston, 5th Baronet =

English Baronet and Member of Parliament

Sir Thomas Alston, 5th Baronet (23 March 1724 – 18 July 1774) was an English Baronet and Member of Parliament.

Thomas Alston was the eldest son of Sir Rowland Alston, 4th Baronet of Odell, Bedfordshire, by his wife, Elizabeth Raynes. He was born on 23 March 1724 and baptised at St. James Church, Westminster nearly one month later, 22 April 1724. He was admitted at Queens' College, Cambridge in 1740. From 1747 to 1761 he was MP for Bedfordshire. In 1750 he married Catherine Davie Bovey, but separated from her by mutual consent two years later. Confined for a while to a madhouse, he was nevertheless re-elected to Parliament unopposed in 1754. Horace Walpole reported a sorry appearance in the House of Commons in November 1755: "Poor Alston was mad, and spoke ten times to order."

On 2 January 1759, he succeeded his father as 5th Baronet. He did not stand for Parliament in 1761.

Alston died 18 July 1774, leaving his property (Odell Castle) to his housekeeper Margaret Lee, through whom it eventually made its way to his illegitimate son Thomas. He was buried at Odell.

Parliament of Great Britain
Preceded by Sir Roger Burgoyne, Bt; Sir John Chester, Bt	Member of Parliament for Bedfordshire; 1747–1761; With: Sir Danvers Osborn, Bt 1747–1753; The Earl of Upper Ossory 1753–1758; Henry Osborn 1758–1761	Succeeded by Marquess of Tavistock; Robert Henley-Ongley
Baronetage of England
Preceded by Rowland Alston	Baronet (of Odell, Bedfordshire); 1759–1774	Succeeded by Rowland Alston
