= Sir John Burgoyne, 7th Baronet =

English general (1739–1785)

Sir John Burgoyne, 7th Baronet (1739–1785) was an English general, seventh baronet, of Sutton, Bedfordshire, and cousin of Lieutenant-General John Burgoyne.

== Life ==
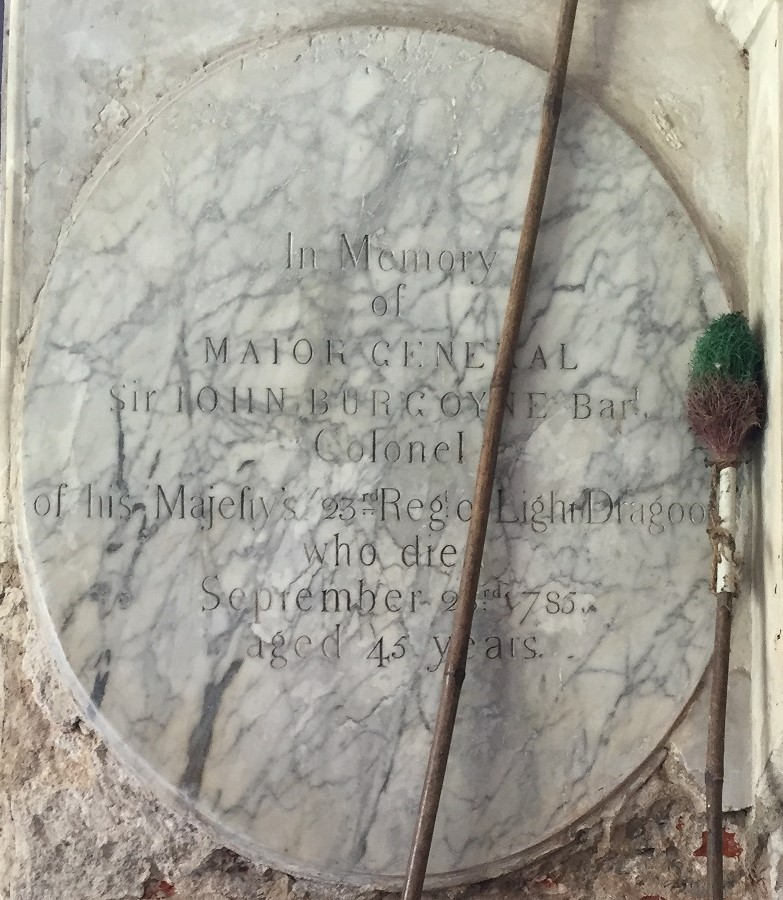
Sir John Burgoyne Memorial, St. Mary's Church, Madras

Burgoyne entered the army at an early age. After serving in the 7th Fusiliers and other corps, he obtained the lieutenant-colonelcy of the 58th Foot in Ireland in 1764. Some years later he was transferred to that of the 14th Light Dragoons, then on the Irish establishment. The 'Calendar of Home Office Papers,' 1770–2, pars. 224, 639, shows these appointments to have been dictated by political as well as professional considerations.

In 1781 Burgoyne was commissioned to raise a regiment of light dragoons for service in India, the first European cavalry sent out to that country. This corps, originally known as the 23rd Light Dragoons, was formed out of drafts from other regiments, and had its rendezvous at Bedford. Standards, now in possession of the 19th Hussars, were presented to it by George III, and early in 1782 it embarked, with other reinforcements, on board the East India fleet under convoy of Admiral Sir R. Bickerton, and landed at Madras towards the end of the year. Under its changed name of the 19th Light Dragoons it subsequently won great renown on Indian battle-fields. Burgoyne was promoted to the rank of major-general on the Madras staff in 1783.

He died at Madras in 1785. He had married Charlotte, daughter of General Johnstone of Overston, Northamptonshire, and by this lady, who afterwards married, secondly, Lieutenant-general Eyre Power Trench, he left several children.

Burgoyne's eldest son, Sir Montague Roger Burgoyne, 8th Baronet, was also a cavalry officer, and like his father ultimately became a major-general. He entered the army as cornet in the Scots Greys in 1789, and in 1795 became lieutenant-colonel of the short-lived 32nd Light Dragoons. He was afterwards for some years one of the inspecting field-officers of yeomanry and volunteer corps. He died at his mother's residence in Oxford Street, London, on 11 August 1817. Shortly before his death Burgoyne was the object of a curious and vexatious prosecution, in which the vicar of his parish sued him for penalties under an old law for not having attended divine service during a period exceeding twelve months. The proceedings fell through.

Baronetage of England
Preceded by Roger Burgoyne	Baronet (of Sutton); 1780–1785	Succeeded by Montagu Burgoyne
