= Julian Alston =

Australian American economist

Julian Alston is an Australian American economist, currently a Distinguished Professor of Agricultural and Resource Economics and Director of the Robert Mondavi Institute at University of California, Davis, and also a published author. He is a Fellow of the American Agricultural Economics Association and Distinguished Fellow of Australian Agricultural and Resource Economics Society. Alston received his Ph.D. in economics from North Carolina State University in 1984.
