= Richard Alston =

Richard Alston may refer to:

- Richard Alston (choreographer) (1948–2026), British choreographer
- Richard Alston (politician) (born 1941), Australian high commissioner to the UK and former Australian senator
- Richard Alston (gridiron football) (born 1980), gridiron football wide receiver and return specialist
- Richard Alston (classicist) (born 1965), professor of Roman history at Royal Holloway, University of London
