= Edward Montagu (1649–1690) =

English politician (1649–1690)

Hon. Edward Montagu II (25 September 1649 – 27 February 1690) was an English politician, the son of Hon. George Montagu. He was elected MP for Seaford in 1681 and Northamptonshire in 1685 and 1689, not standing in 1690 due to ill health. He married Elizabeth, daughter of Sir John Pelham, 3rd Baronet. When his brother Charles Montagu, 1st Earl of Halifax died childless in 1715, his son George inherited the earldom.

Parliament of England
Preceded by Sir William Thomas; Herbert Stapley	Member of Parliament for Seaford; 1681–1685; With: Edward Selwyn	Succeeded by Edward Selwyn; Sir William Thomas
Preceded by John Parkhurst; Miles Fleetwood	Member of Parliament for Northamptonshire; 1685–1690; With: Sir Roger Norwich 1685–1689; Edward Harby 1689; Sir Thomas Samwell	Succeeded by Sir St Andrew St John; John Parkhurst
