= Sir Thomas Alston, 3rd Baronet =

English Member of Parliament

Sir Thomas Alston, 3rd Baronet (c. 1676 – December 1714) was an English Member of Parliament.

Thomas Alston was the eldest son of Sir Rowland Alston, 2nd Baronet of Odell, Bedfordshire and Temperance Crew; the family included Puritans on both sides. He was educated at Trinity College, Cambridge.

Alston succeeded his father as Baronet in 1697. From 1698 to 1701 he was MP for Bedford; it is unclear with which of the Parliamentary groupings his sympathies lay. In 1701–2 he undertook a trip to Italy with the Earl of Holderness, during which Alston had meetings with the Duke of Shrewsbury in Rome. He died unmarried, probably in London, in December 1714. "The story that he had wasted his estate and at the time of his death was a prisoner in the Fleet is not borne out by his will, in which the Odell estate and other property in Bedfordshire was left intact and charged with numerous bequests".

Parliament of England
Preceded by William Spencer; William Farrer	Member of Parliament for Bedford; 1698 – 1701; With: William Spencer	Succeeded by William Spencer; Samuel Rolt
Baronetage of England
Preceded by Rowland Alston	Baronet (of Odell); 1697 – 1714	Succeeded by Rowland Alston
