= Robert W. Alston =

Robert West Alston was an American cotton planter who lived near Lake Miccosukee, Leon County, Florida. Alston was originally from Halifax County, North Carolina, and came to Florida by way of Hancock County, Georgia.

Dueling was popular on the frontier. Alston's son Augustus Alston entered a duel with George Taliaferro Ward, just north of Tallahassee, prior to Ward's entering the American Civil War. Prince Achille Murat (Prince Murat) was serving as Ward's second, and Dr. Randolph of Tallahassee was the attending physician. Alston shot Ward first, breaking his leg and forcing Ward to the ground. Alston walked toward him, still shooting. Another shot broke George Ward's arm. When Alston got directly over Ward, he had no shots left while Ward still had one.

Alston was said to fold his arms and declare, "I believe he will kill me after all." Ward fired his last shot and missed. Ward demanded more guns and insisted that Murat prop him up so that the contest might continue, but he fainted before his instructions could be carried out. The men later agreed to continue the duel. Before Ward had recovered sufficiently to fight, Alston was killed in a duel with Florida Militia Brigadier General Leigh Read. Alston was head of the Whig party in Florida and Read was a leader of the Democrats. Read was later killed by Willis Alston.
