= Sir George Osborn, 4th Baronet =

Lieutenant-General Sir George Osborn Bt
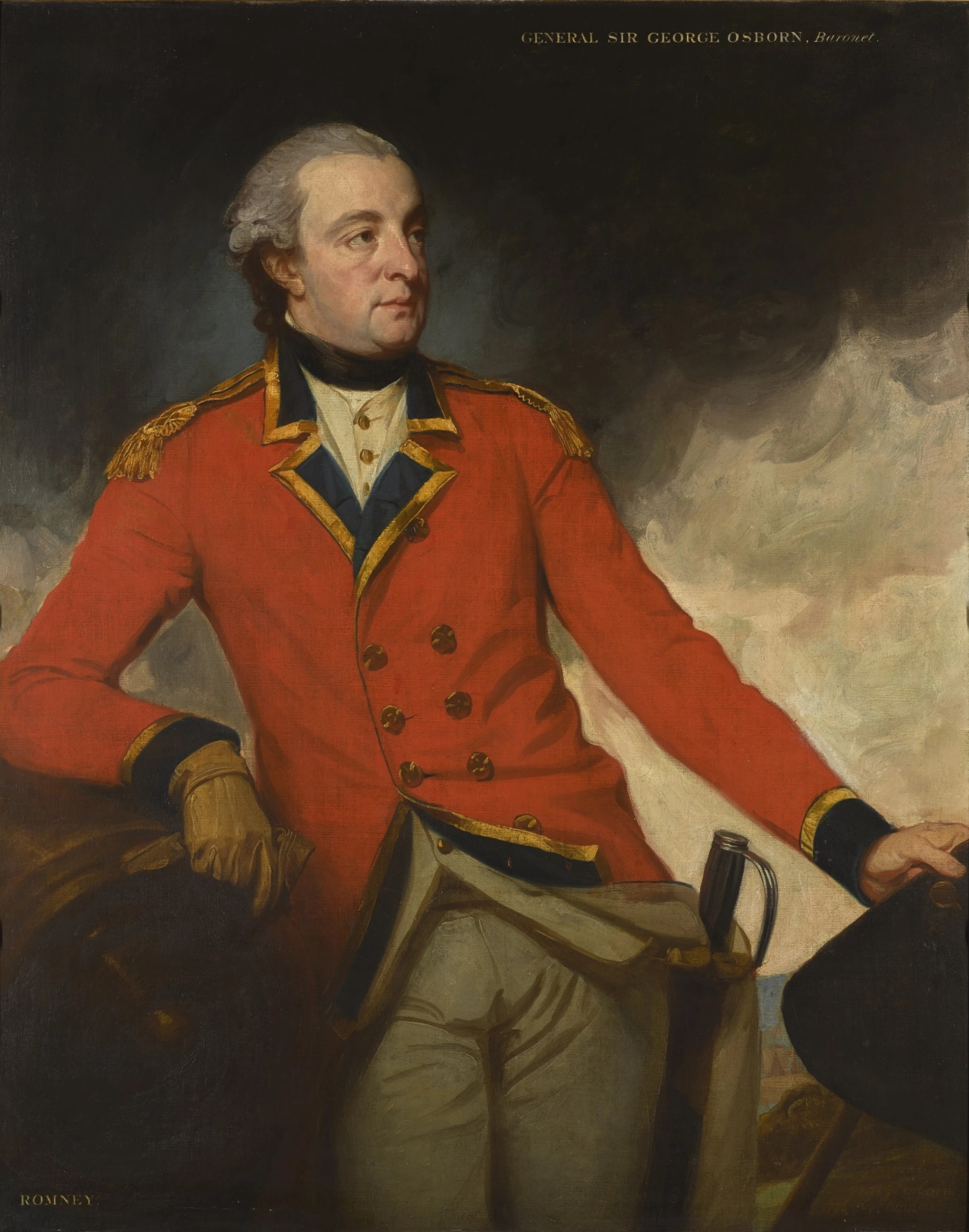
- Portrait by George Romney, 1778
- Born: 10 May 1742
- Died: 29 June 1818 (aged 76)
- Military career
- Allegiance: Great Britain; United Kingdom
- Branch: British Militia; British Army
- Service years: 1759–1818
- Rank: Lieutenant-general
- Units: Bedfordshire Militia; Brigade of Guards
- Commands: 3rd Dragoon Guards; 8th Regiment of Foot; 40th Regiment of Foot
- Conflicts: American War of Independence; Battle of Brandywine; Battle of Germantown; Siege of Fort Mifflin
- Other work: Groom of the Chamber

Lieutenant-General Sir George Osborn, 4th Baronet (10 May 1742 – 29 June 1818) was a British military officer and Tory politician who served in the American War of Independence. He also sat in the House of Commons from 1769 to 1784. In 1777, Osborn led a detachment of the Brigade of Guards at the battles of Brandywine and Germantown. Besides his combat duties, he served as the inspector of Hessian troops in North America. After returning from America in 1777, Osborn was promoted to brigadier general. In 1787, he received advancement to lieutenant-general.

== Early career ==
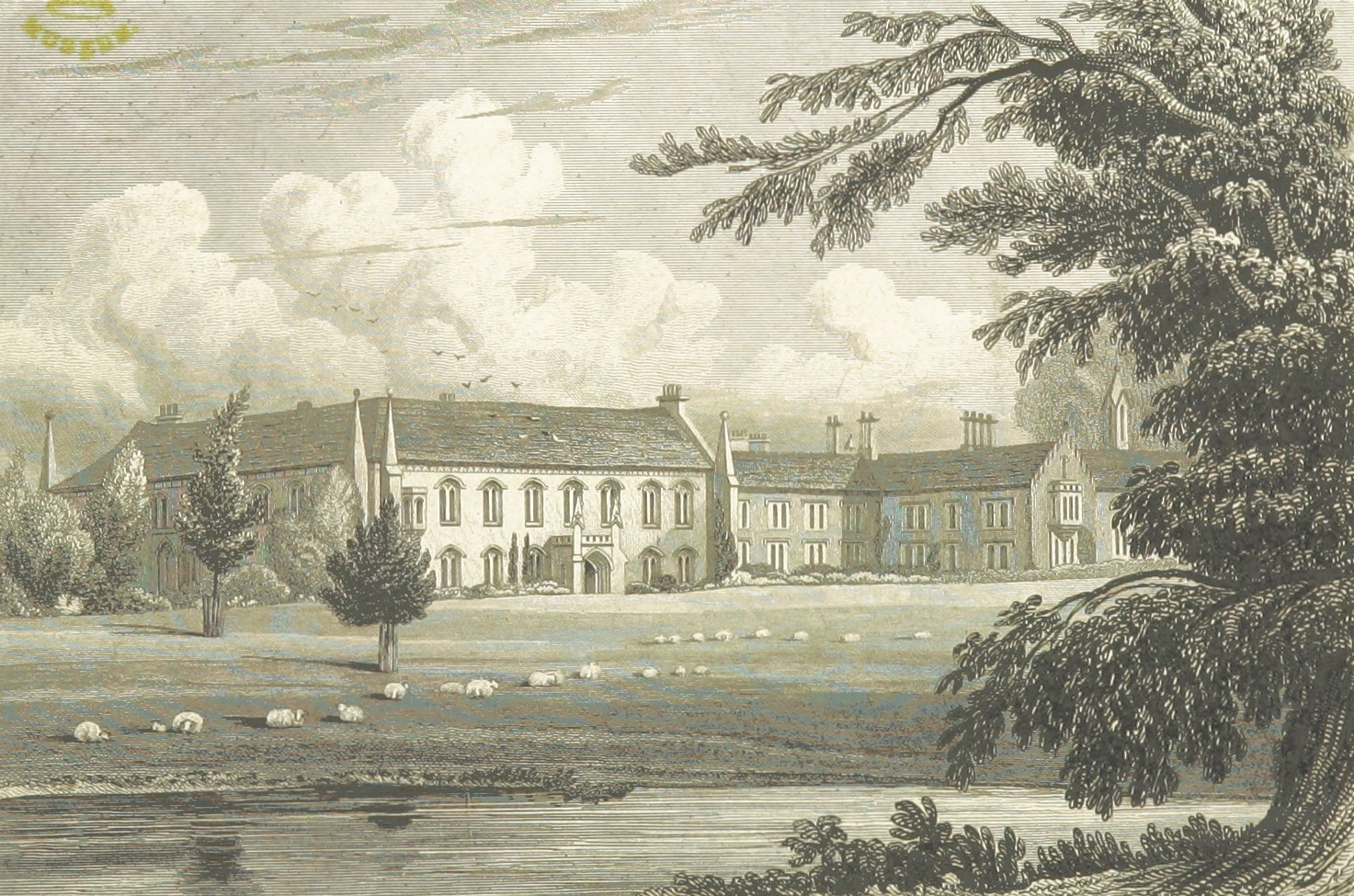
Chicksands Priory, which Osborn inherited in 1753

Born on 10 May 1742, Osborn was the oldest son of Sir Danvers Osborn, 3rd Baronet and educated at Westminster School and Trinity College, Cambridge. He succeeded to the baronetcy and the family seat at Chicksands Priory when his father died in 1753, while governor of the Province of New York. Osborn was a cousin of Frederick North, Lord North who was Prime Minister of Great Britain from 1770 to 1782. He was the grandson of George Montagu, 1st Earl of Halifax and the nephew of George Montagu-Dunk, 2nd Earl of Halifax. He was also a nephew of the army officer and playwright John Burgoyne. He served as Groom of the Bedchamber to George III from 1770 to 1812.

In 1759, at the age of 17, he was commissioned as major of the Bedfordshire Militia, before being transferred to the British Army. He was elected on 24 April 1769, to the House of Commons of Great Britain for the constituency of Bossiney. On 12 October 1774 he was elected for the constituency of Penryn. Like his relative Lord North, Osborn was a Tory.

== American War of Independence ==
When the American War of Independence began in 1775 Osborn was captain of the Brigade of Guards' grenadier company at the rank of lieutenant colonel. In addition to his other duties, he filled the post of Mustermaster-General and Inspector of the Foreign Troops. The latter responsibility required him to keep track of the strength and condition of the Hessian troops in North America. The information was sent to Lord George Germain, the Secretary of State for America. Among his friends, Osborn counted Lieutenant Colonel William Harcourt of the 16th Light Dragoons, Captain-lieutenant Richard FitzPatrick of the 1st Foot Guards, Lieutenant-colonel Sir John Wrottesley of the 2nd Foot Guards, and Colonel Henry Monckton of the 2nd Grenadier Battalion.

On 31 May 1777, a 20-man patrol of the Continental Army's Spencer's Additional Continental Regiment under Lieutenant William Martin were ambushed by 60 Hessian jägers near Raritan Landing, New Jersey. Three jägers were wounded, while the Hessians killed Martin and six of his men while capturing seven more. When the Americans recovered Martin's body, it was mangled with 17 sword wounds, "most of them mortal". The corpse was displayed to American troops as proof of their enemies' brutality. Already irritated by incidents such as the fata bayoneting of Brigadier General Hugh Mercer at the Battle of Princeton, George Washington sent Martin's remains into the British lines under a flag of truce with a letter of protest. When the wagon bearing Martin's corpse arrived at Osborn's picket post, he accepted the letter but refused to take the body. Osborn's witty reply that he "was no coroner" was received among British officers with great amusement and even made the rounds in London.

At the Battle of Brandywine on 11 September 1777, Mathew's brigade was part of Lieutenant General Lord Charles Cornwallis' division which had reached a position on the American right rear before being detected. At 4:00 PM, the Guards Brigade took position on the right flank of the first line. Osborn commanded both the grenadier company on the right and the light company which deployed as skirmishers in front. They were opposed by the Maryland Division which was commanded by Major General John Sullivan. Since Sullivan was responsible for supervising the American right wing, he left the division under the leadership of Brigadier General Philippe Hubert Preudhomme de Borre. The Frenchman mishandled the Marylanders, throwing the division into confusion. With the Americans in disarray, the attack of the Guards easily swept them aside. At the end of the day, the entire brigade reported only one killed, five wounded, and two missing. Of these, one casualty was from Osborn's grenadiers and three from the light company. A few days after the battle Osborn and FitzPatrick caught two Guard grenadiers out plundering. The unfortunate soldiers were both sentenced to 500 lashes as punishment.

The night before the Battle of Germantown on 4 October 1777, Howe warned Osborn to expect trouble and the detached Guard grenadier and light companies took post on the far right flank next to the Queen's Rangers, a loyalist American unit. In the morning they were attacked by Brigadier General William Smallwood's Maryland militia and Brigadier General David Forman's New Jersey militia. The militia captured a few outworks but their organization soon unraveled in the face of opposition by professional soldiers. After driving back the American amateurs, the British swung to their left to flank Brigadier General Alexander McDougall's Connecticut Brigade.

On 10 November, during the final part of the siege of Fort Mifflin, Howe directed Osborn to lead an amphibious assault on the fort on Mud Island. Accordingly, he assembled his grenadier company plus an additional four officers, eight NCOs, two drummers, and 150 enlisted men from the Guards Brigade and marched to Province Island on the Delaware River. They were joined there by a detachment of light infantry, the 27th Foot and the 29th Foot. Osborn planned to load eight flatboats with 35 soldiers each for the initial assault. In the event, the American garrison evacuated the fort on the night of 15 November and Osborn's detachment occupied the place without opposition. On 16 December 1777, Osborn and Lord Cornwallis left Philadelphia aboard the armed ship Brilliant. During his tenure as Inspector of the Foreign Troops, he cultivated excellent relations with the Hessian officer corps. Upon his arrival in England, George III promoted Osborn to brigadier general. Having obtained leave from his regiment, he then traveled in Europe.

== Later career ==
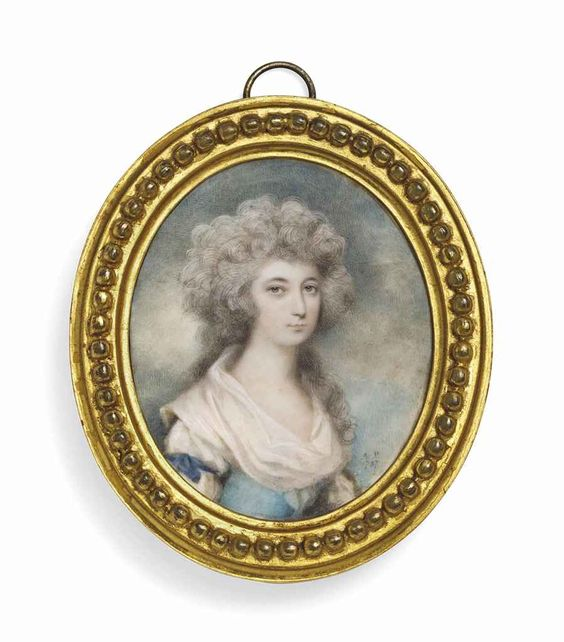
1787 portrait of Osborn's second wife Heneage Finch

On 30 November 1780, Osborn was elected to Parliament in a by-election, this time to the Horsham constituency in Sussex. Osborn was promoted to lieutenant-general in 1787. On 1 September 1795, Prince Frederick, Duke of York and Albany wrote a report to George III after inspecting military units in the Northern District. The report stated that Osborn commanded the 3rd Dragoon Guards, the 8th Regiment of Foot, and the Durham militia at Whitburn. The 8th Foot was praised as the best line regiment in the district though its officers were not in regulation uniforms. Only 100 troopers of the 3rd Dragoon Guards were present since two squadrons had been sent to the continent. The Durham militia were well-drilled but their uniforms and equipment were in bad condition.

Osborn was made colonel of the 40th Regiment of Foot from 1786 to his death. He died on 29 June 1818. He had married twice; firstly in April 1771 to Elizabeth, the daughter and coheiress of John Bannister, with whom he had a son John and secondly in August 1788 to Lady Heneage Finch, the daughter of Daniel, 8th Earl of Winchilsea, no issue. Lady Heneage was recorded among the ladies who carried Queen Charlotte's trains at the 1761 coronation. He was succeeded by his son John.

== See also ==
- Osborn Baronets

== Notes ==
Footnotes

Citations

== External sources ==
- Phillips, Michael. ageofnelson.org Ships of the Old Navy: HMS Brilliant 1757

Parliament of Great Britain
Preceded by Henry Lawes Luttrell; Lord Mount Stuart	Member of Parliament for Bossiney; 1769–1774; With: Lord Mount Stuart	Succeeded by Henry Lawes Luttrell; Lord Mount Stuart
Parliament of Great Britain
Preceded by Sir William Lemon, Bt; Hugh Pigot	Member of Parliament for Penryn; 1774–1780; With: William Chaytor	Succeeded by Francis Basset; John Rogers
Preceded by George Legge; James Wallace	Member of Parliament for Horsham; 1780–1784; With: James Wallace 1780; James Craufurd 1783	Succeeded by Jeremiah Crutchley; Philip Metcalfe
Baronetage of England
Preceded by Danvers Osborn	Baronet (of Chicksands); 1753–1818	Succeeded by John Osborn
Military offices
New post	Colonel of the 73rd (Highland) Regiment of Foot; April 1786– August 1786	Succeeded by Sir William Medows
Preceded by Sir Robert Hamilton, Bt	Colonel of the 40th Regiment of Foot; 1786–1818	Succeeded by Sir Brent Spencer
