= Granny Alston =

English cricketer

Personal information
- Full name: Hallam Newton Egerton Alston
- Born: 10 June 1908; Cheltenham, England
- Died: 20 October 1985 (aged 77); Gloucester, England
- Batting: Right-handed
- Bowling: Right-arm off-break

Domestic team information
- Years: Team
- 1933: Somerset
- Only First-class: 26 July 1933 Somerset v Surrey

Career statistics
Competition	First-class
Matches	1
Runs scored	6
Batting average	3
100s/50s	0/0
Top score	4
Balls bowled	42
Wickets	1
Bowling average	6.00
5 wickets in innings	0
10 wickets in match	0
Best bowling	1/6
Catches/stumpings	0/–
- Source: CricketArchive, 20 August 2008

Hallam Newton Egerton "Granny" Alston (10 June 1908 – 20 October 1985) was an English cricketer who played one first-class cricket match for Somerset.

Alston made one appearance for Somerset during the 1933 season, against Surrey at The Oval. While he scored just two runs in the first innings of the game and four in the second, his bowling figures of 1-6 from seven overs were economical, and his only first-class wicket was that of 50-year-old former Test cricketer Jack Hobbs, though Hobbs had made 117 by the time he was out.

Alston was a right-handed middle-order batsman and a right-arm off-break bowler.

In the Second World War, he was commissioned as a second lieutenant in the Somerset Light Infantry. While on service, he played a non-first-class war-time cricket match for the Combined Services cricket team at Hull and took five London Counties wickets for 31 runs with his off-spin.
