= Odell Castle =

11th-century castle in England

- Odell, Bedfordshire, England
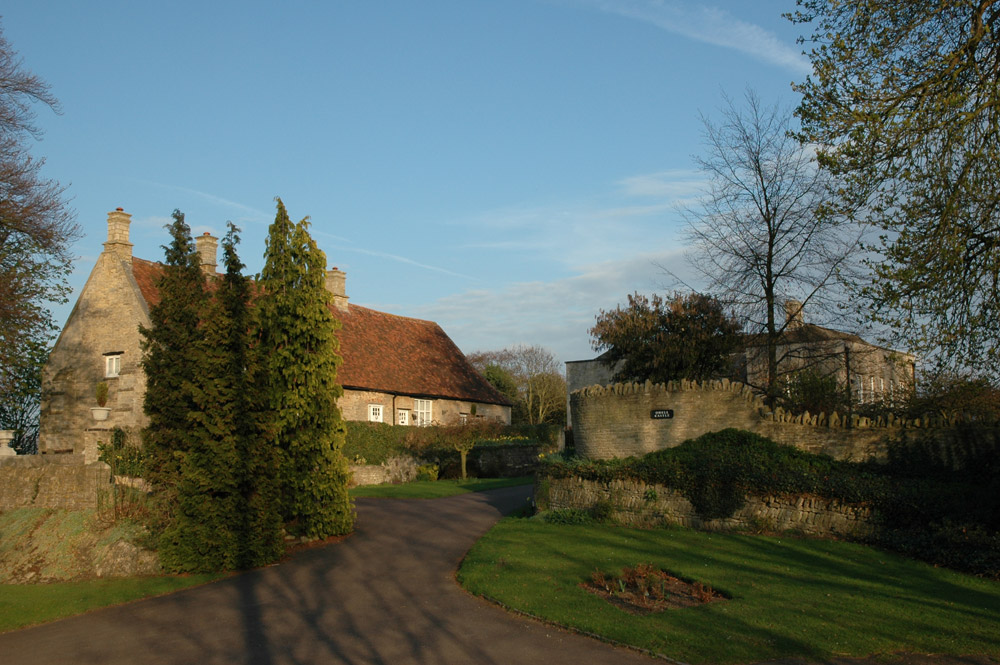
- The new Odell Castle, built in 1962

Site information
- Type: Castle
- Condition: Earthworks

Location
- Shown within Bedfordshire
- Coordinates: 52.2109°N 0.5876°W
- Grid reference: grid reference SP966579

Odell Castle was an 11th-century castle in the village of Odell, in the county of Bedfordshire, England.

The land where Odell Castle stood was originally owned by Levenot, a thegn of King Edward the Confessor. At the time, the land and village were called Wahull. After the Norman invasion, William the Conqueror gave the lands, manor, and title, to Walter de Flandrensis (circa 1068). Walter was titled the Baron of Wahull, and was thus recorded as Walter de Wahul. De Wahul built a motte-and-bailey castle, with a stone keep, on the land. The family lived here for some 400 years.

In 1542, the title died out with the absence of a male heir and came into the possession of 17-year-old Agnes Woodhall, a descendant of de Wahul's. Upon her death in 1575 it passed to her son Richard Chetwood, who sold it to William Alston in 1633. The family were later created Alston baronets of Odell. By the time of the sale, the castle was already in ruins. Alston built a new residence, incorporating the remains of the keep, the oval motte of the old castle still held up by a retaining wall. Alterations were made by his descendants in the 18th century. It stayed as thus until 24 February 1931, when the manor burnt down. A new manor house was built on the site in 1962; it is currently owned by Lord Luke.

The old stones were used in the construction of the new manor, but otherwise there is little left of the original castle. Only cropmarks and earthworks remain.

== See also ==
- Castles in Great Britain and Ireland
- List of castles in England
