= Margaret Alston-Garnjost =

British physicist (1929–2019)

- Born: Margaret Alston-Garnjost; January 23 1929; London, England
- Other name: Margaret Alston
- Education: University of Liverpool (PhD)
- Known for: Bubble Chamber
- Scientific career
- Fields: Physics

Margaret Hope Alston-Garnjost (also published as Margaret Alston, January 23, 1929 – February 7, 2019) was a British physicist who worked for many years at the Lawrence Berkeley National Laboratory, where her research with the bubble chamber contributed to the Nobel Prize winning work of her supervisor Luis Walter Alvarez.

== Education and career ==
Alston-Garnjost was born in London on January 23, 1929; her parents were Pauline and Norman Alston. To escape World War II, her parents sent her to be schooled at St. Cyprian's School, Cape Town in South Africa, living with cousins in Cape Town. She completed a Ph.D. in physics at the University of Liverpool in 1955.

After completing her Ph.D., she took a position at the Lawrence Radiation Laboratory in Berkeley, California, which eventually became the Lawrence Berkeley National Laboratory. There, she met and married fellow laboratory employee Bertram Garnjost in 1966. Her supervisor, Luis Walter Alvarez, earned the Nobel Prize for his work with the bubble chamber in 1968, and he noted Alston's work in his acceptance speech, joking based on the similarity in their names that their publications were by "Alston et al". Her later work also included experiments on double beta decay with Robert Kenney and Robert D. Tripp, conducted in an abandoned mine in Idaho.

After retiring, Alston-Garnjost and her husband moved to Oregon, returning to the East Bay region of California in 2008. She died on February 7, 2019.

== Recognition ==
Alston-Garnjost was named a Fellow of the American Physical Society (APS) in 1984, after a nomination from the APS Division of Nuclear Physics, "for contributions to the discovery and measurements of properties of both light and heavy quark resonances".
