= Lettie Alston =

American composer (1953–2014)

Lettie Beckon Alston (1953 – March 31, 2014) was an American composer known for her piano work and a longstanding series of concerts, "Lettie Alston and Friends".

== Biography ==
Alston was born in 1953 in Detroit, Michigan, United States.

Alston attended Wayne State University for her undergraduate and masters degrees. In 1983, she earned her doctorate in musical composition from the University of Michigan (UM), where she had studied with Leslie Bassett, William Bolcom and Eugene Kurtz. She was the first African American to earn this degree from UM.

In 1991, Alston joined the faculty at Oakland University as associate professor of music in the Department of Music, Theatre and Dance.

== Work ==
Alston's work included traditional, as well as electronic instruments. She composed for orchestra, chamber and vocal groups.

In 1995, Alston started a series of concerts at Oakland University called "Lettie Alston and Friends". The concerts featured contemporary classical music usually based around a central theme. The last of these concerts took place in 2008.

In 2001, her work was recorded on a two-CD set, Keyboard Maniac. The set highlighted both her work on acoustic and electric piano.

Alston died on March 31, 2014, while vacationing in Hawaii.

== Selected works ==
=== Instrumental Solos ===
==== Violin ====
Pulsations (unaccompanied). 1974, revised 1993. Duration 10:00. Three movements. Recorded by Gregory Walker, Kaleidoscope: Music by African-American women (Leonarda CD-LE339). Library: AMRC, IU-USM. Available from: Alston.

==== Oboe ====
Three implied jesters (unaccompanied). 1975. Available from: Alston.

==== Percussion ====
Visions (piano, marimba). 1979, revised 1993. Duration: 7:00. Performances include Larry Kaptein, marimba, Lettie Beckon Allston, piano, University of Michigan Symposium on Black Women Composers, August 1985. Library: AMRC. Available from: Alston.

==== Piano ====
Four moods for piano. 1993. Duration: 12:00. Performances include the Unisys African-American Forum Chamber Music Concert, Orchestra Hall, Detroit, April 1993. Library: AMRC, IU-USM. Available from Alston.

Moods for piano. 1975. Duration: 5:00. Library: AMRC, Available from Alston.
