= Lee J. Alston =

American economic historian

Lee James Alston
- Born: March 29, 1951 (age 74); Port Washington, Wisconsin, U.S.
- Education: Indiana University, Bloomington, University of Washington
- Awards: Cliometric Society Award in 2012, past president of the International Society for the New Institutional Economics
- Scientific career
- Fields: Economic history
- Institutions: Indiana University, Bloomington
- Thesis: Cost of contracting and decline or tennancy in the South, 1930-1960 (1978)

Lee J. Alston (born March 29, 1951) is the Ostrom Chair, Professor of Economics and Law, and Director of the Ostrom Workshop at Indiana University. He is also a research associate at the National Bureau of Economic Research. On August 6, 2014, Alston was appointed director of the Vincent and Elinor Ostrom Workshop in Political Theory and Policy Analysis at Indiana University, Bloomington, from which he received his B.A. in 1973.

His research has focused on institutions and contracts and their role in influencing rural land use in the US and Brazil.

In 2012 Alston was awarded a Clio Can award by the Cliometric Society for Exceptional Support to the Field of Cliometrics.

== Education ==
Alston received his B.A. in 1973 from Indiana University, and Ph.D. in economics from the University of California, Berkeley, where he developed an interest in the relationship between institutions, economic policies, and outcomes.

== Career ==
Alston has held several academic positions, including as a professor of economics at Indiana University and University of Colorado Boulder. He has made significant contributions to understanding how institutional arrangements, such as property rights and political governance, influence economic performance. His research also explores the economic history of developing countries, with a particular focus on Latin America and Eastern Europe.

In addition to his academic roles, Alston has worked extensively on policy analysis and has been involved with various international organizations, advising governments on improving their economic institutions and governance systems.

== Selected publications ==
- Alston, Lee J.; Libecap, Gary D. (1996). "The determinants and impact of property rights: land titles on the Brazilian frontier". Journal of Law, Economics, and Organization. 12 (1): 25–61. doi:10.1093/oxfordjournals.jleo.a023360.
- Alston, Lee J.; Libecap, Gary D.; Mueller, Bernardo (1999). Conflict, and Land Use: The Development of Property Rights and Land Reform on the Brazilian Amazon Frontier. University of Michigan Press.
