= George Aiston =

Australian ethnographer and outback pioneer

George (Poddy) Aiston (1879–1943) was an Australian ethnographer and outback pioneer who spent much of his life as policeman in the South Australian town of Mulka on the Birdsville Track.

== External sources ==
- Aiston to W. H. Gill, correspondence, 1920–40 (State Library of New South Wales)
- Savage, Life in Central Australia; compiled by George Aiston and George Horne, edited and published by David M. Welsh, London, Macmillan, 1924.
- The Aboriginal narcotic pitcheri George Aiston. Sydney, Australian National Research Council, 1930
- The Mulka Store ruins is listed on the South Australian state register of heritage places.
