= Bill Alston =

Scottish footballer

Personal information
- Full name: William Alston
- Date of birth: 19 April 1884
- Place of birth: Scotland
- Date of death: 1971 (aged 86–87)
- Position: Wing half

Senior career*
Years	Team	Apps	(Gls)
1903–06	Vale of Dryfe		
1906–1907	Maxwelltown Volunteers		
1907–1908	Lincoln City	18	(2)
1908	Rochdale		
Total		18	(2)
- * Club domestic league appearances and goals

William Alston (19 April 1884 – 1971) was a Scottish footballer who played in the Football League for Lincoln City. He had an unsuccessful trial with Liverpool in the 1905–06 season.
