= Alston baronets =

Extinct baronetcy in the Baronetage of England

There have been two baronetcies created for persons with the surname Alston, both in the Baronetage of England. Both creations are extinct.

Escutcheon of the Alston baronets

The Alston Baronetcy, of Odell in the County of Bedford, was created in the Baronetage of England on 13 June 1642 for Thomas Alston. The third Baronet sat as Member of Parliament for Bedford. The fourth and fifth Baronets both sat as Knight of the Shire for Bedfordshire. The title became extinct on the death of the sixth Baronet in 1791.

The Alston Baronetcy, of Chelsea in the County of London, was created in the Baronetage of England on 20 January 1682 for Joseph Alston. The title became extinct on the death of the eighth Baronet in 1819.

== Alston baronets, of Odell (1642) ==
- Sir Thomas Alston, 1st Baronet (c. 1609–1678)
- Sir Rowland Alston, 2nd Baronet (c. 1654–1697)
- Sir Thomas Alston, 3rd Baronet (c. 1676–1714)
- Sir Rowland Alston, 4th Baronet (c. 1678–1769)
- Sir Thomas Alston, 5th Baronet (died 1774)
- Sir Rowland Alston, 6th Baronet (died 1791)

== Alston baronets, of Chelsea (1682) ==
- Sir Joseph Alston, 1st Baronet (died 1688)
- Sir Joseph Alston, 2nd Baronet (c. 1640–1689)
- Sir Joseph Alston, 3rd Baronet (c. 1665–1716)
- Sir Joseph Alston, 4th Baronet (1691–1718)
- Sir Evelyn Alston, 5th Baronet (1692–1750)
- Sir Evelyn Alston, 6th Baronet (c. 1721–1783)
- Sir William Alston, 7th Baronet (1722–1801)
- Sir William Alston, 8th Baronet (1746–1819)
