= William Hillersden =

English politician (1676–1725)

William Hillersden (1676 – 6 April 1725) was an English politician and sheriff who sat as MP for Bedford from 15 December 1707 till 1710 and Bedfordshire from 1715 till 1722.

He was baptised on 24 April 1676, he was the first son of Thomas Hillersden, MP for Bedford and Mary Hillersden (née Forth). He was educated at Wadham College, Oxford in 1693. By 1705, he married Elizabeth, the daughter of William Farrer.
