= Sir Danvers Osborn, 3rd Baronet =

British politician and colonial administrator

Sir Danvers Osborn Bt
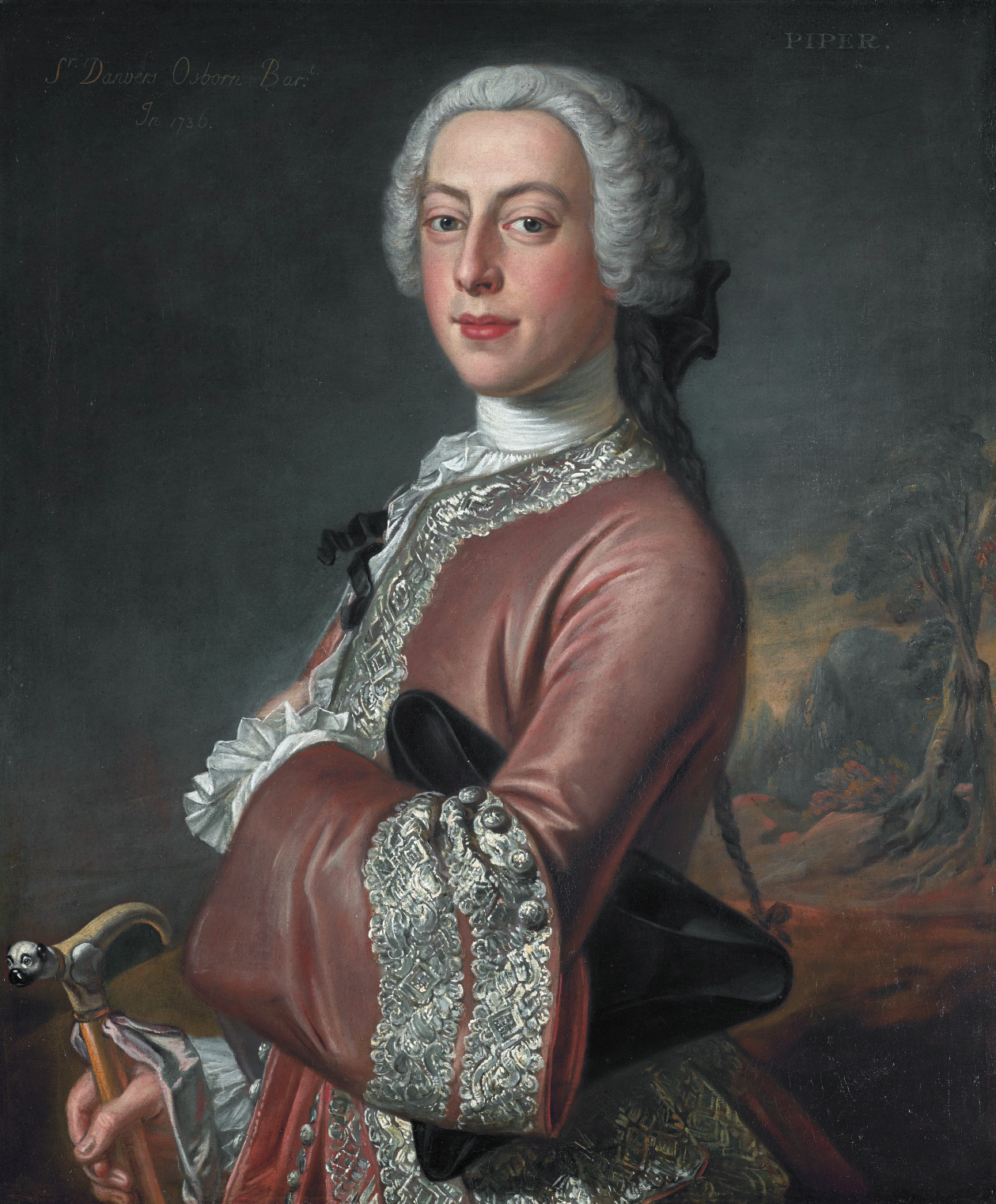
- 1736 portrait of Osborn by Petrus Johannes van Reysschoot

Governor of New York
- In office 1753–1753
- Monarch: George II
- Preceded by: George Clinton
- Succeeded by: James De Lancey

Personal details
- Born: 17 November 1715 Shefford, Bedfordshire
- Died: 12 October 1753 (aged 37) New York City, New York
- Profession: Politician, colonial administrator

Sir Danvers Osborn, 3rd Baronet (17 November 1715 – 12 October 1753) was a British politician and colonial administrator who served as the governor of New York in 1753. During the Jacobite rising of 1745, he raised and commanded troops in support of George II of Great Britain. Osborn later represented Bedfordshire in the House of Commons of Great Britain from 1747 to 1753. In 1750, he traveled to Nova Scotia and became part of the Nova Scotia Council. Osborn had a history of melancholia and committed suicide in New York shortly after he had taken office as governor.

== Early life ==
Osborn was born on 17 November 1715, in the village of Chicksands (Shefford, Bedfordshire, England), which was the seat of the Osborn family. His father was John Osborn, eldest son of Sir John Osborn, 2nd Baronet (see Osborn baronets). Of the previous four generations of paternal relatives, two grandmothers (Lady Doroty Danvers and Lady Eleanor Danvers) had belonged to the Danvers lineage. Osborn's mother was Sarah Byng. Her father was George Byng, the 1st Viscount Torrington, whereas her brother was the Admiral John Byng. Both Byng relatives were prominent figures against the Jacobite rising of 1689. In 1720, he succeeded his grandfather in the baronetcy.

Osborn was married to Lady Mary Montagu on 25 September 1740. She was of the 8th generation of Henry VIII's lineage. Her father was George Montagu, 1st Earl of Halifax, whereas her brother George Montagu-Dunk became the 2nd Earl. Osborn begot two children, of whom one was named George. However, in 1743, Lady Montagu died after delivering the second child. Osborn was quite affected by grief for her for the rest of his life. During the subsequent years, Osborn was a frequent guest at the Montagu-Dunk's manor of Horton (Northamptonshire).

When Charles Edward Stuart invaded Britain during the Jacobite rising of 1745 on behalf of the House of Stuart, Osborn raised troops to support the King George II and commanded the forces into battle within Colonel Bedford's regiment under the Duke of Cumberland.

== Political career ==
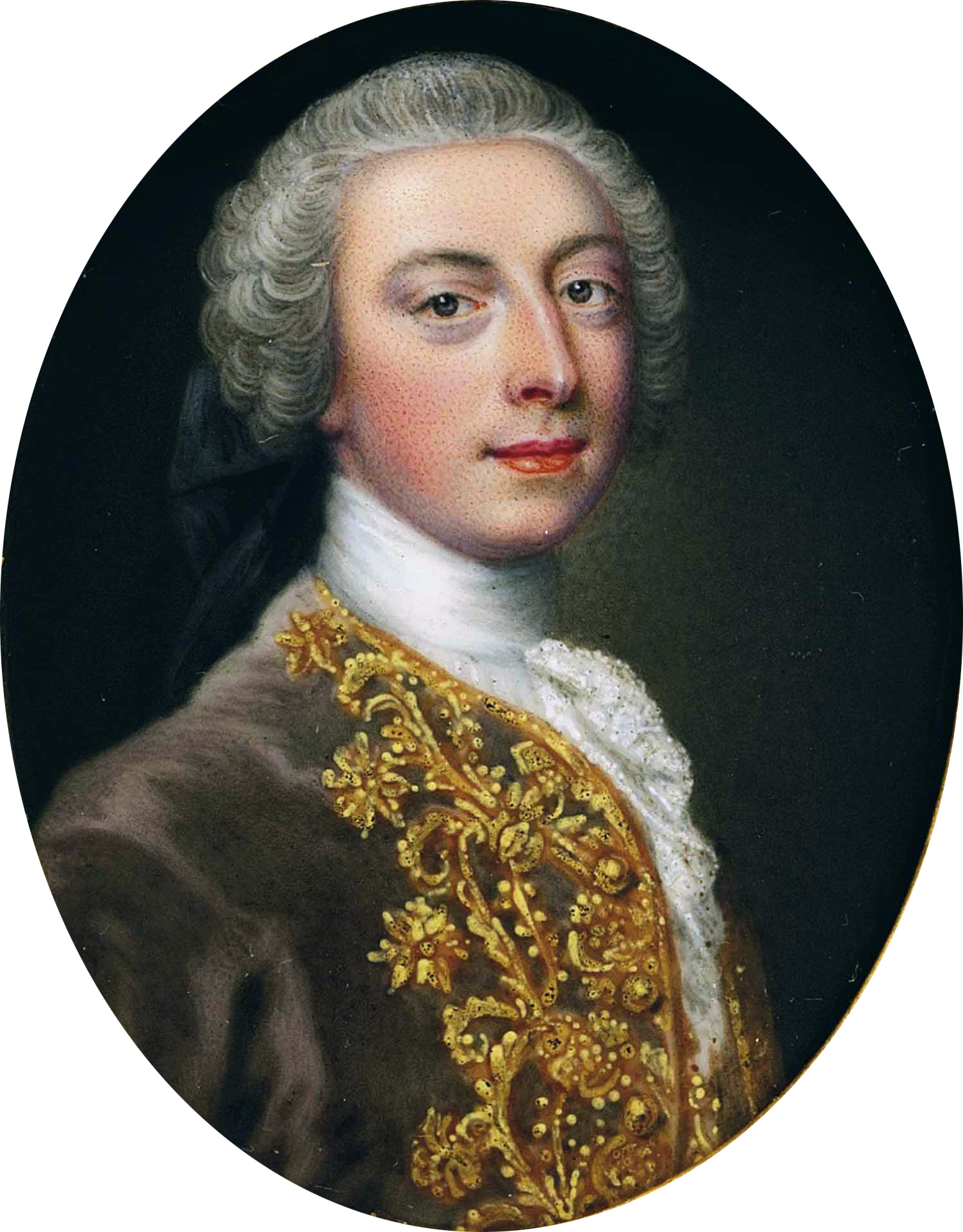
Danvers Osborn

Subsequently, Osborn represented Bedfordshire as a Member of Parliament (1747–1753). In 1750, following the 2nd Earl of Halifax, who was presiding the Board of Trade and founding the city of Halifax in Nova Scotia, Danvers Osborn travelled to Nova Scotia for six weeks, integrating into the Nova Scotia Council (August). Therein, many issues were attended by Osborn such as the supplies of the new settlers; the remuneration of the construction workers of the royal projects; and the regulation of the local trade, which was functioning then on Sundays despite the biblical precepts. Attending to so many local matters brought Osborn esteem from the settlers. Back in England, in December, he discussed the issues of Halifax with the official functionaries of trade and plantation.

In May 1753, the Board of Trade recommended that Danvers Osborn should be the next Royal Governor of the Province of New York. In July, his appointment was approved. After his arrival on 6 October, Osborn was welcomed officially by the mayor and the assemblymen of New York, and formally assumed his office on 10 October. His personal secretary was the Englishman Thomas Pownall.

== Death ==
On 12 October 1753, Osborn's dead body was found in the garden of the house in which he was lodged, which belonged to a local councilman. The body presented evidences of strangulation. James De Lancey, the lieutenant governor who took over as acting governor on Osborn's death, reported to the Board of Trade that Osborn had had a melancholic demeanor, which evidenced a great psychological disorder. Historically, such depression to provoke Osborn's suicide, is attributed to grief over his lost wife. The New York Post reported his death and gave details of the last week of his life before his suicide.

Initially, Osborn was buried at the Trinity Church of New York. In 1754, his remains were transported to Osborn's native parish of England (Chicksands), where he was reinterred.

== See also ==
- Chicksands
- Bedfordshire
- George Montagu-Dunk, 2nd Earl of Halifax
- Jacobite risings
- Halifax, Nova Scotia
- Province of New York
- James DeLancey
- Danvers, Massachusetts a town named after his honor.

== Sources ==
- Colonial Governors of NY
- Sir Danvers Osborn
- Fergusson, Charles Bruce (1974). "Osborn, Sir Danvers". In Halpenny, Francess G. (ed.). Dictionary of Canadian Biography. Vol. III (1741–1770) (online ed.). University of Toronto Press.
- Chicksands. A Millennium Of History
- The Baronetage of the Osborns of Chicksands.

Government offices
Preceded by George Clinton	Governor of the Province of New York; 1753	Succeeded by James DeLancey
Parliament of Great Britain
Preceded by Sir Roger Burgoyne, Bt; Sir John Chester, Bt	Member of Parliament for Bedfordshire; 1747–1753 with Thomas Alston	Succeeded by Thomas Alston; The Earl of Upper Ossory
Baronetage of England
Preceded by John Osborne	Baronet (of Chicksands); 1720–1753	Succeeded by George Osborn
