= Osborn baronets =

Title in the Baronetage of England

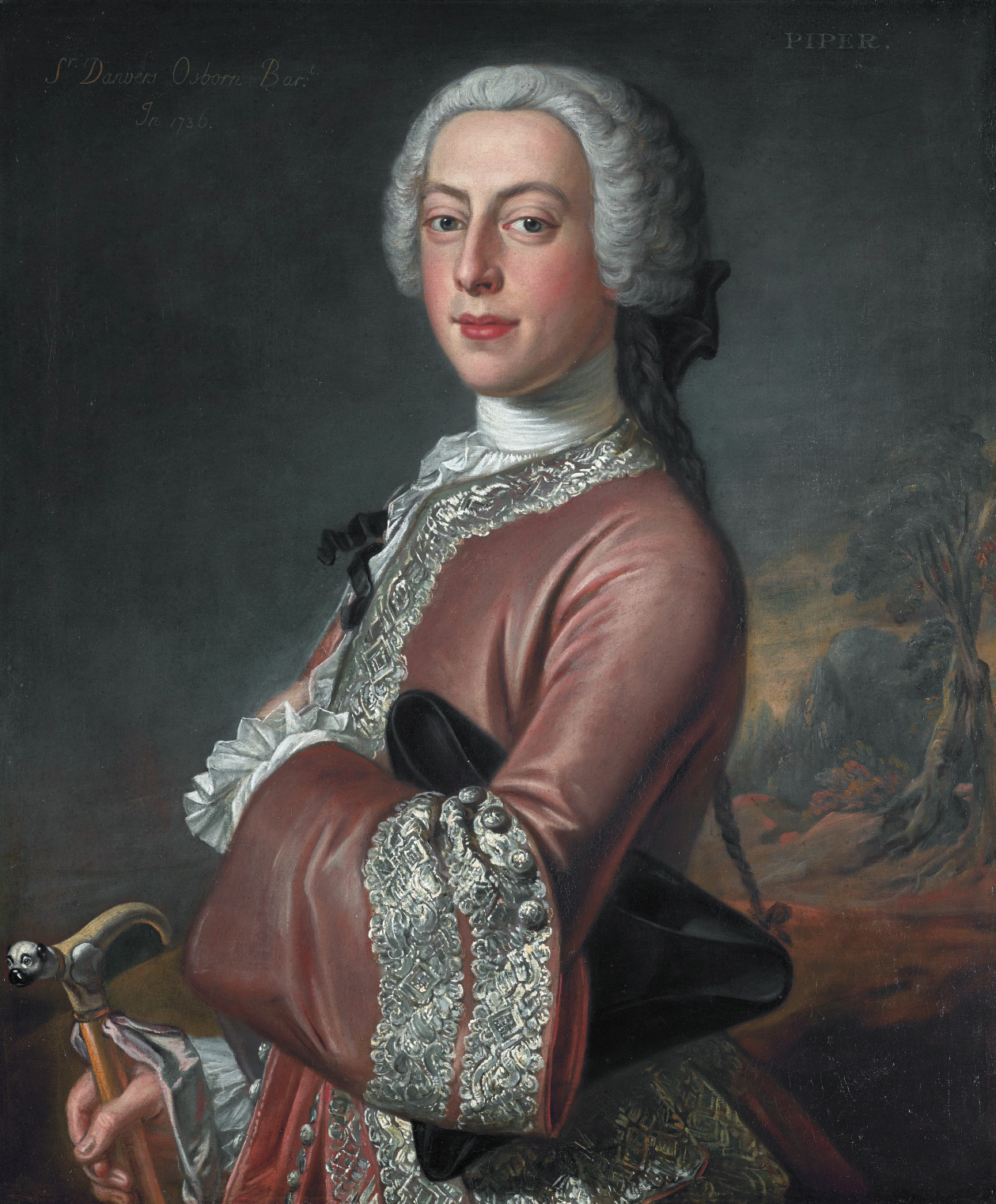
Sir Danvers Osborn, 3rd Baronet

The Osborne, later Osborn Baronetcy, of Chicksands in the County of Bedford, is a title in the Baronetage of England. It was created on 11 February 1662 for John Osborne, subsequently Remembrancer to the Treasury from 1674 to 1698. The baronetcy was in recognition of the sufferings the family had suffered for its support of Charles I.

Osborne was the son of Sir Peter Osborne, Governor of Guernsey, and great-grandson of Peter Osborne, who acquired the family seat of Chicksands Priory in 1576 and was Remembrancer of the Treasury to Henry VIII, Keeper of the Privy Purse to Edward VI, and Commissioner of Ecclesiastical Affairs to Elizabeth I.

Dorothy Osborne (1627–1695) was the daughter of Sir Peter Osborne and sister of the first Baronet. She was engaged to Henry Cromwell, son of Oliver Cromwell, and also pressured to marry Thomas Osborne, 1st Duke of Leeds, but eventually married Sir William Temple, 1st Baronet, whom she truly loved. The correspondence between Dorothy and William during their lengthy separation is one of the "great monuments of epistolary literature".

The third Baronet was the son of John Osborn, eldest son of the second Baronet, who altered the spelling of the family surname to Osborn to avoid confusion with the Osborne family which had earlier been created Osborne baronets, of Kiveton in 1620, and were elevated to the peerage as the Duke of Leeds.

The third Baronet was Governor of New York and Member of Parliament for Bedfordshire. The fourth Baronet was a General in the British Army and also represented Northampton, Bossiney, Penrhyn and Horsham in the House of Commons. The fifth Baronet was Member of Parliament for four constituencies and served as a Lord of the Admiralty under the Earl of Liverpool.

The current baronet was the second but eldest surviving son of the 8th baronet.

== Osborne, later Osborn baronets, of Chicksands (1662) ==
- Sir John Osborne, 1st Baronet (c. 1615–1699)
- Sir John Osborne, 2nd Baronet (c. 1650–1720)
- Sir Danvers Osborn, 3rd Baronet (1715–1753)
- Sir George Osborn, 4th Baronet (1742–1818)
- Sir John Osborn, 5th Baronet (1772–1848)
- Sir George Robert Osborn, 6th Baronet (1813–1892)
- Sir Algernon Kerr Butler Osborn, 7th Baronet (1870–1948)
  - Capt. Peter Stanley Howard Osborn (20 August 1912 – † 4 February 1944)
- Sir Danvers Lionel Rouse Osborn, 8th Baronet (1916–1983)
  - Peter Robin Danvers Osborn (23 August 1954 – 26 December 1954)
- Sir Richard Henry Danvers Osborn, 9th Baronet (born 1958)

There are no heirs to the baronetcy.

== Coat of arms ==
Coat of arms of Osborn
Crest A lion's head erased argent, ducally crowned or Escutcheon Argent, a bend between two lions rampant sable Motto Quantum in rebus inane ("How much vanity there is in human affairs") Other elements Canton of a baronet

== See also ==
- Osborne baronets
