= George Montagu, 1st Earl of Halifax =

British politician and peer

The Right Honourable The Earl of Halifax PC KB

Auditor of the Exchequer
- In office 1714–1739
- Monarch: George II
- Preceded by: The Earl of Halifax
- Succeeded by: The Lord Walpole

Member of Parliament for Northampton
- In office 1707–1715 Serving with Francis Arundell, William Wykes
- Preceded by: Parliament of England
- Succeeded by: William Wykes; William Wilmer
- In office 1705–1707 Serving with Francis Arundell
- Preceded by: Sir Matthew Dudley; Francis Arundell
- Succeeded by: Parliament of Great Britain

Personal details
- Born: George Montagu; 1684
- Died: 1739 (aged 54–55)
- Parent(s): Edward Montagu; Elizabeth Pelham
- Education: Eton College
- Note: uncle also held Barony of Halifax which he inherited by special remainder, had been made first earl of the first creation in 1714.

George Montagu, 1st Earl of Halifax (also spelt George Montague) PC KB (c. 1684 – 9 May 1739), of Horton, Northamptonshire, was a British Whig politician who sat in the House of Commons from 1705 to 1715 when he became a peer.

== Early life ==
Montagu was the son of Edward Montagu of Horton and his wife Elizabeth Pelham, a daughter of Sir John Pelham, 3rd Baronet. He succeeded his father in 1690, and received the post then of Warden and chief forester of Salcey forest, Northamptonshire, which he held for the rest of his life.

He was educated at Eton College in 1698. From 1701 to 1704, he travelled abroad through Italy, Austria, Holland, Budapest, Belgrade and Constantinople. He was a paternal great-grandson of Henry Montagu, 1st Earl of Manchester.

== Career ==
Montagu was returned unopposed as Member of Parliament for Northampton with the support of Christopher Montagu at the 1705 English general election. He was returned again at the 1708 British general election, the 1710 British general election and at the 1713 British general election. In 1714 he was appointed appointments Auditor of the Exchequer, which he held for the rest of his life.

He was made a Privy Councillor on 27 November 1717, Lord Justice in 1720 and Keeper/Ranger of Bushy Park. He was appointed a Knight, Order of the Bath (K.B.) in 1725. He was a member of the Hanover Club.

=== Residences ===
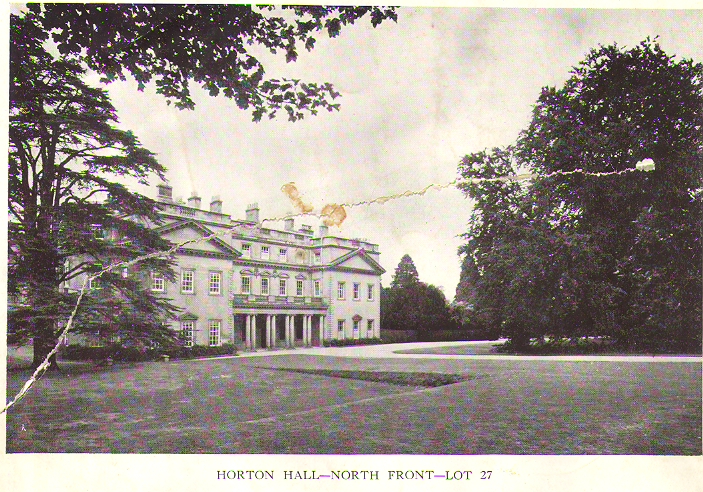
Horton House 1935, as extended, and just before demolition

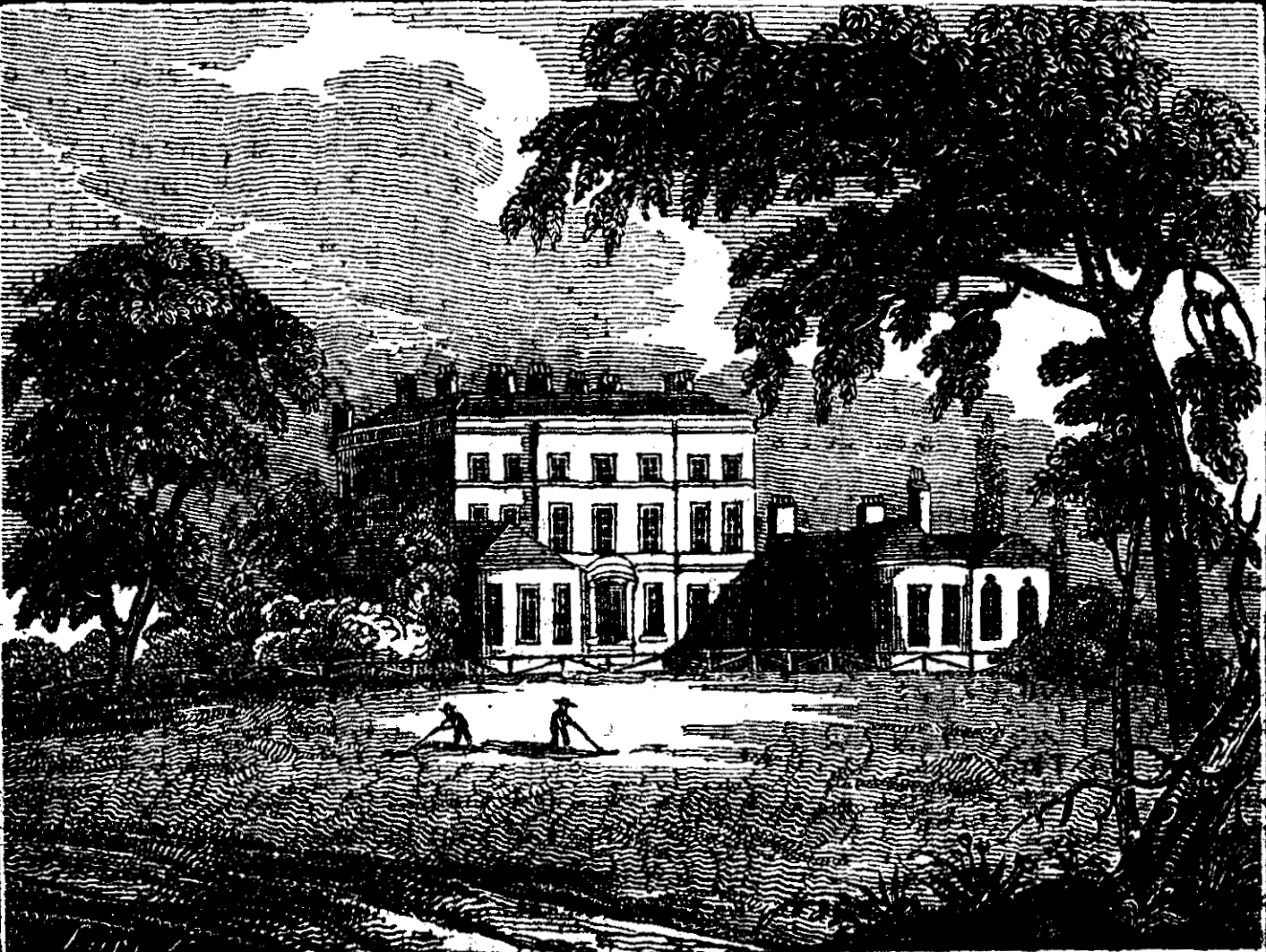
Bushy House from an 1827 book illustration

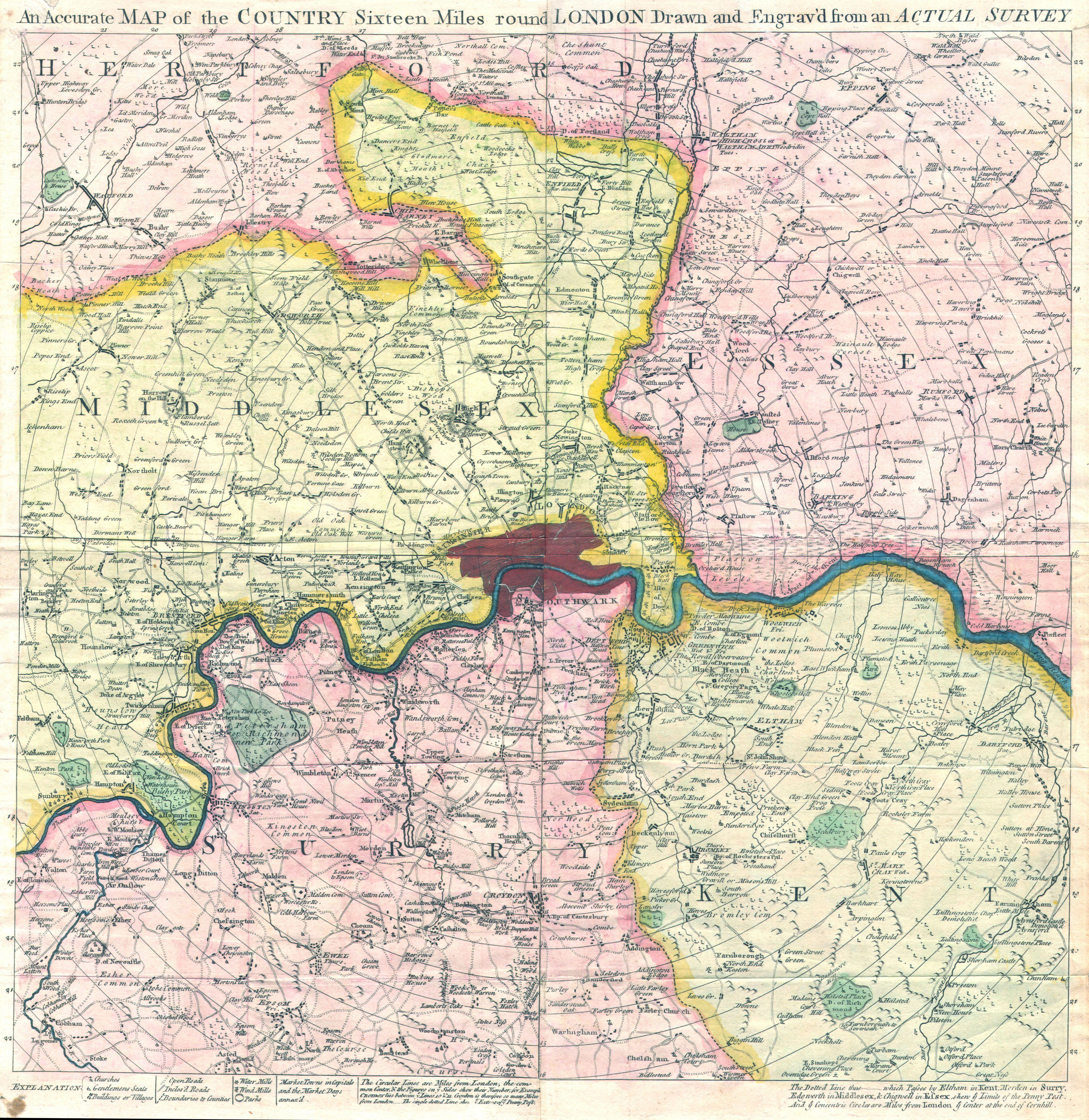
Extract from Gentleman's Magazine: Map of London & Environs, 1764 noting his son's ownership of various lodges in and adjoining Bushy Park, Hampton and Teddington, Middlesex

His family's seat was Horton House, Horton, Northamptonshire which was demolished in 1936.

As Ranger of Bushy Park, Halifax had built (1714–1715) and sometimes inhabited 'Upper Lodge' or 'New Lodge', today a function building of the National Physical Laboratory, on the north-west side of the park in its Teddington part. This was in the first two years of the reign of George II just as he acceded to his titles. The property passed to his son, followed by Lord North, his eldest daughter's son.

=== Peerage ===
George's uncle, Charles Montagu, 1st Earl of Halifax, a childless widower, ensured his titles would pass to George (being the eldest son of his eldest brother), and gave him most of his estate. George succeeded his uncle as second Baron Halifax under its special remainder.

A few weeks after succeeding, George was created Earl of Halifax and Viscount Sunbury, reviving the other titles which had been created the previous year for his uncle. Two years later he was sworn of the Privy Council.

== Personal life ==
Montagu was twice married. On 8 April 1706, he married Ricarda Posthuma Saltonstall (c. 1689–1711). Before her death in 1711, they were the parents of one daughter:

- Lady Lucy Montagu (c. 1709–1734), who married Francis North, 1st Earl of Guilford.

On about 28 June 1712, Montagu married Lady Mary Lumley (1690–1726), a daughter of Richard Lumley, 1st Earl of Scarborough. Together they had at least seven children, including:

- George Montagu, 2nd Earl of Halifax (1716–1771), who inherited his father's titles in 1739.
- Lady Frances Montagu (d. 1768), who married Sir Roger Burgoyne, 6th Baronet, in 1739.
- Lady Anne Montagu (c. 1720–1766), who married Joseph Jekyll of Dallington, in 1750.
- Lady Mary Montagu (d. 1743), who married Sir Danvers Osborn, 3rd Baronet MP, in 1740.
- Lady Elizabeth Montagu (d. 1789), who married Henry Archer MP, second son of Andrew Archer MP and Elizabeth Dashwood (a daughter of Sir Samuel Dashwood, Lord Mayor of London in 1702) in 1743.
- Lady Barbara Montagu (d. 1765), who died unmarried.
- Lady Charlotte Montagu (d. 1762), who married Col. James Johnston, a son of Secretary of State, Scotland James Johnston, in 1747.

George Montagu died in 1739 and was succeeded in the titles by his son George.

=== Descendants ===
Through his eldest child Lucy, he was a grandfather of Frederick North, Lord North, who served as the prime minister of Great Britain from 1770 to 1782.

Parliament of England
Preceded by Sir Matthew Dudley; Francis Arundell	Member of Parliament for Northampton; 1705–1707; With: Francis Arundell	Succeeded by Parliament of Great Britain
Parliament of Great Britain
Preceded by Parliament of England	Member of Parliament for Northampton; 1707–1715; With: Francis Arundell 1707–10; William Wykes 1710–15	Succeeded by William Wykes; William Wilmer
Political offices
Preceded by The Earl of Halifax	Auditor of the Exchequer; 1714–1739	Succeeded by The Lord Walpole
Peerage of Great Britain
New creation	Earl of Halifax; 3rd creation 1715–1739	Succeeded by George Montagu
Peerage of England
Preceded by Charles Montagu	Baron Halifax; 1715–1739	Succeeded by George Montagu
