= Sir Jeremy Sambrooke, 4th Baronet =

British landowner and Tory politician

Sir Jeremy Sambrooke, 4th Baronet (c. 1703–1740) of Bush Hill, Enfield, Middlesex, was a British landowner and Tory politician who sat in the House of Commons from 1731 to 1740.

== Early life ==
Sambrooke was the only son of Sir Samuel Sambrooke, 3rd Baronet, MP for Bramber and Great Bedwyn, and the former Elizabeth Wright. Among his sisters were Jane Elizabeth Sambrooke (wife of Charles Wake-Jones and Sir Humphrey Monoux, 4th Baronet), and Susannah Sambrooke (wife of John Crawley, MP for Marlborough).

His maternal grandfather was Sir Nathan Wright of Caldecote, Warwickshire, Lord Keeper of the Great Seal under King William III and Queen Anne. His maternal aunt, Dorothy Wright, was the wife of Henry Grey, 3rd Earl of Stamford. His paternal grandfather was Sir Jeremy Sambrooke of Bush Hill, a director of the East India Company.

After attending the school of Dr. Uvedale at Enfield, Sambrooke was admitted at Inner Temple probably in 1716 and at Trinity College, Cambridge on 7 July 1720, aged 17, where he was awarded MA in 1722.

== Career ==
Having acquired considerable estates in the north of Bedfordshire from 1719, Sambrooke stood as a Tory at several by-elections, but was unsuccessful at Queenborough in February 1728, Wendover in March 1728, and Queenborough again in January 1729. However, he was returned as Member of Parliament for Bedford at a by-election on 30 January 1731, with the support of Wriothesley Russell, 3rd Duke of Bedford and by spending lavishly. He was returned unopposed at the 1734 British general election, and voted against the Administration in all recorded divisions.

=== Baronetage ===
He succeeded his father to the baronetcy on 27 December 1714. His father had succeeded to the baronetcy under special remainder on the death of his maternal uncle Sir John Vanacker, 2nd Baronet.

== Personal life ==
Sambrooke died unmarried on 5 July 1740. He was succeeded in the baronetcy by his uncle, Jeremy Sambrooke, the fifth and last baronet.

Parliament of Great Britain
Preceded by John Orlebar; James Metcalfe	Member of Parliament for Bedford; 1731– 1740; With: John Orlebar; Samuel Ongley 1734	Succeeded by Samuel Ongley; Sir Boteler Chernock, Bt
Baronetage of England
Preceded by Samuel Sambrooke	Baronet (of London); 1714-1740	Succeeded by Jeremy Sambrooke
