= Sir Samuel Sambrooke, 3rd Baronet =

British landowner and politician

Sir Samuel Sambrooke, Bt

Member of Parliament for Great Bedwyn
- In office 1708–1710 Serving with Lord Bruce
- Preceded by: Lord Bruce; Nicholas Pollexfen
- Succeeded by: Lord Bruce; Sir Edward Seymour

Member of Parliament for Bramber
- In office 1704–1705 Serving with John Asgill
- Preceded by: John Asgill; John Middleton
- Succeeded by: John Asgill; The Viscount Windsor

Personal details
- Born: Samuel Sambrooke c. 1677 London
- Died: 27 December 1714 (aged 36–37) Chancery Lane
- Spouse: Elizabeth Wright (m. 1701)
- Relations: John Sambrooke (brother)
- Parent(s): Sir Jeremy Sambrooke; Judith Vanacker

Sir Samuel Vanacker Sambrooke, 3rd Baronet (c. 1677 – 27 December 1714) of Bush Hill, Enfield, Middlesex, was a British landowner and politician who sat in the House of Commons as MP for Bramber and Great Bedwyn.

== Early life ==
Sambrooke was born into a wealthy family of merchants, long connected with the East India Company and Madras. He was the eldest son and heir of Sir Jeremy Sambrooke of Bush Hill (d. 1705) and Judith (née Vanacker) Sambrooke. His younger brother was John Sambrooke, MP for Dunwich and Wenlock who married Elizabeth Forester (daughter of Sir William Forester and granddaughter of James Cecil, 3rd Earl of Salisbury). Among his sisters were Catherine Sambrooke (the wife of Sir William Strickland, 4th Baronet, Secretary at War), Hannah Sambrooke (wife of John Gore, MP for Great Grimsby and a son of Sir William Gore).

His maternal grandparents were Susanna (née Butler) Vanacker (a daughter of James Butler of Amberley Castle, Sussex) and Nicholas Vanacker, a merchant who was Lord of the manor of Erith, Kent. His maternal uncles were Sir Nicholas Vanacker, 1st Baronet and Sir John Vanacker, 2nd Baronet.

== Career ==
Sambrooke was elected to the Parliament of England for Bramber in 1704 in place of John Middleton whose return had been declared void. The following year, however, Sambrooke and William Penn Jr. lost their bid for election to Parliament for Bramber. Penn filed, but later withdrew, a petition charging his opponents with bribery. He was reelected for Great Bedwyn in the Parliament of Great Britain in 1708, serving until 1710. He did not stand again.

In 1711, he succeeded to the baronetcy, and estates, under special remainder on the death of his maternal uncle, Sir John Vanacker, 2nd Baronet.

== Personal life ==
On 21 January 1701, Sambrooke was married to Elizabeth Wright at St Giles in the Fields. She was a daughter of Sir Nathan Wright of Caldecote, Warwickshire, Lord Keeper of the Great Seal under King William III and Queen Anne. Elizabeth's sister, Dorothy Wright, married Henry Grey, 3rd Earl of Stamford. Together, they were the parents of three daughters and one son, including:

- Jane Elizabeth Sambrooke, who married Charles Wake-Jones of Waltham Abbey, Essex, son of Sir Baldwin Wake, 5th Baronet. After his death, she married Sir Humphrey Monoux, 4th Baronet, son of Sir Philip Monoux, 3rd Baronet, in 1742.
- Sir Jeremy Vanacker Sambrooke, 4th Baronet (c. 1703–1740), MP for Bedford; he died unmarried.
- Susannah Sambrooke (1708–1799), who married John Crawley, MP for Marlborough and son of Richard Crawley.

Sir Samuel died on 27 December 1714 at his home in Chancery Lane. His widow lived until 7 December 1775. He was succeeded in the baronetcy by his son, Jeremy. Upon Jeremy's death in 1740, the baronetcy went to his uncle, Jeremy Sambrooke, the fifth and last baronet.

Parliament of England
Preceded by John Asgill; John Middleton	Member of Parliament for Bramber; 1704–1705; With: John Asgill	Succeeded by John Asgill; The Viscount Windsor
Parliament of Great Britain
Preceded by Lord Bruce; Nicholas Pollexfen	Member of Parliament for Great Bedwyn; 1708–1710; With: Lord Bruce	Succeeded by Lord Bruce; Sir Edward Seymour
Baronetage of England
Preceded by John Vanacker	Baronet (of London); 1711–1714	Succeeded by Jeremy Sambrooke
