= Cerberus Privy =

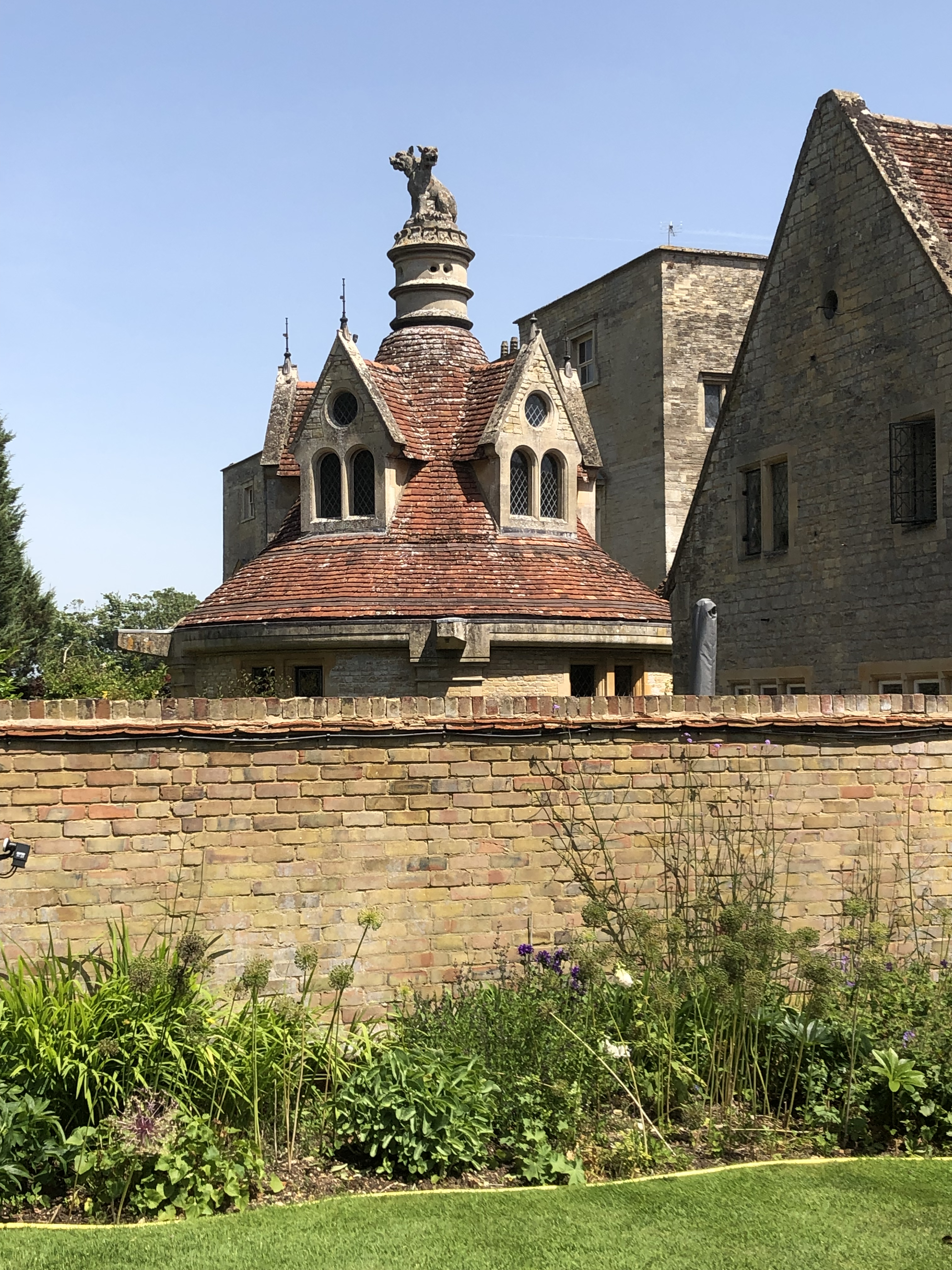
- "One of Burges's happiest inventions"
- Interactive map of the area around the building
- 52.1081°N 0.7671°W
- Type: Lavatory
- Location: Gayhurst, Buckinghamshire, England

History
- Built: 1859-1860

Site notes
- Architect: William Burges
- Architectural style: Victorian Gothic
- Governing body: Privately owned

Listed Building – Grade II*
- Official name: Former Servants Lavatory (Cerberus Privy) at Gayhurst House (Part of 12 Gayhurst Court Mews)
- Designated: 27 February 1984
- Reference no.: 1320166

The Cerberus Privy, at Gayhurst House, Buckinghamshire, England, is a communal lavatory built for the male servants of the house. It was constructed between 1859-1860 and was designed by William Burges. Now converted to a private home, it is a Grade II* listed building.

== History ==
Gayhurst House was built in the early sixteenth-century on the site of a Roman villa and Norman manor. It was expanded in 1597 by William Moulsoe. (Note: The spelling of Moulsoe varies, including Mulshaw, Mulsho, Moulso, and Mulso.) The house was completed by his son-in-law, Sir Everard Digby, one of the conspirators involved in the Gunpowder Plot. In 1704 the estate was sold to Sir Nathan Wrighte.

The house was extensively refurbished, 1858–72, by William Burges for Robert Carrington, 2nd Baron Carrington, and his son. Lord Carrington was Burges' first significant patron. (Note: Robert Carrington was a noted eccentric. Believing his posterior to be made of glass, he "used to discharge [his] legislative and judicial functions standing". When the journalist Grenville Murray revealed Carrington's "laughable hallucination", Carrington's son horsewhipped him on the steps of the Conservative Club.) In total, some £30,000 was spent which did not include the costs of construction for Burges' planned main staircase that was never built. However, a minor stair, the Caliban Stair, was constructed.

The Cerberus Privy was built as a communal lavatory for the male servants of the house. Burges's biographer, J. Mordaunt Crook, considers it "one of Burges's happiest inventions." (Note: Crook notes the influence of Château of Blois on the colourful decorative scheme for the Abbess's Room. He also suggests Harlaxton Manor as another source for Burges's overall interior scheme.) The Gayhurst estate was broken up in the twentieth century and the house was converted into flats, and the estate buildings including the privy were developed into houses, between 1971 and 1979. The estate is privately owned and is not open to the public, although the house can be seen from the footpath to the adjacent Church of St Peter.

== Architecture and description ==
Nikolaus Pevsner and Elizabeth Williamson, in their 2003 revised edition, Buckinghamshire, of the Pevsner Buildings of England suggest Burges's main design influence for the privy was the Abbot's Kitchen, Glastonbury. The building is circular and consists of a main storey, with a dormer attic above. Atop this is a statue of Cerberus, which originally had eyes made of red glass. Crook calls it; "a picturesque convenience, dedicated to a cloacal demon with billiard ball eyes, for a patron with plumbing on the brain".

The Cerberus Privy is a Grade II* listed building.

== Sources ==
- Pevsner, Nikolaus; Williamson, Elizabeth (2003). Buckinghamshire. The Buildings of England. New Haven, US and London: Yale University Press. ISBN 0-300-09584-8.
- Crook, J. Mordaunt (2013). William Burges and the High Victorian Dream. London: Frances Lincoln. ISBN 978-0-711-23349-2. OCLC 995483842.
