= Gayhurst (disambiguation) =

Gayhurst is a village in Buckinghamshire, England.

Gayhurst may also refer to:

- Gayhurst House, or Gayhurst Court, a late-Elizabethan country house in Buckinghamshire, England
- Gayhurst School, a preparatory school in Buckinghamshire, England
- Gayhurst-Partie-Sud-Est, now known as Saint-Ludger, Quebec, Canada
