= Gayhurst House =

Country house in Gayhurst, Buckinghamshire, England

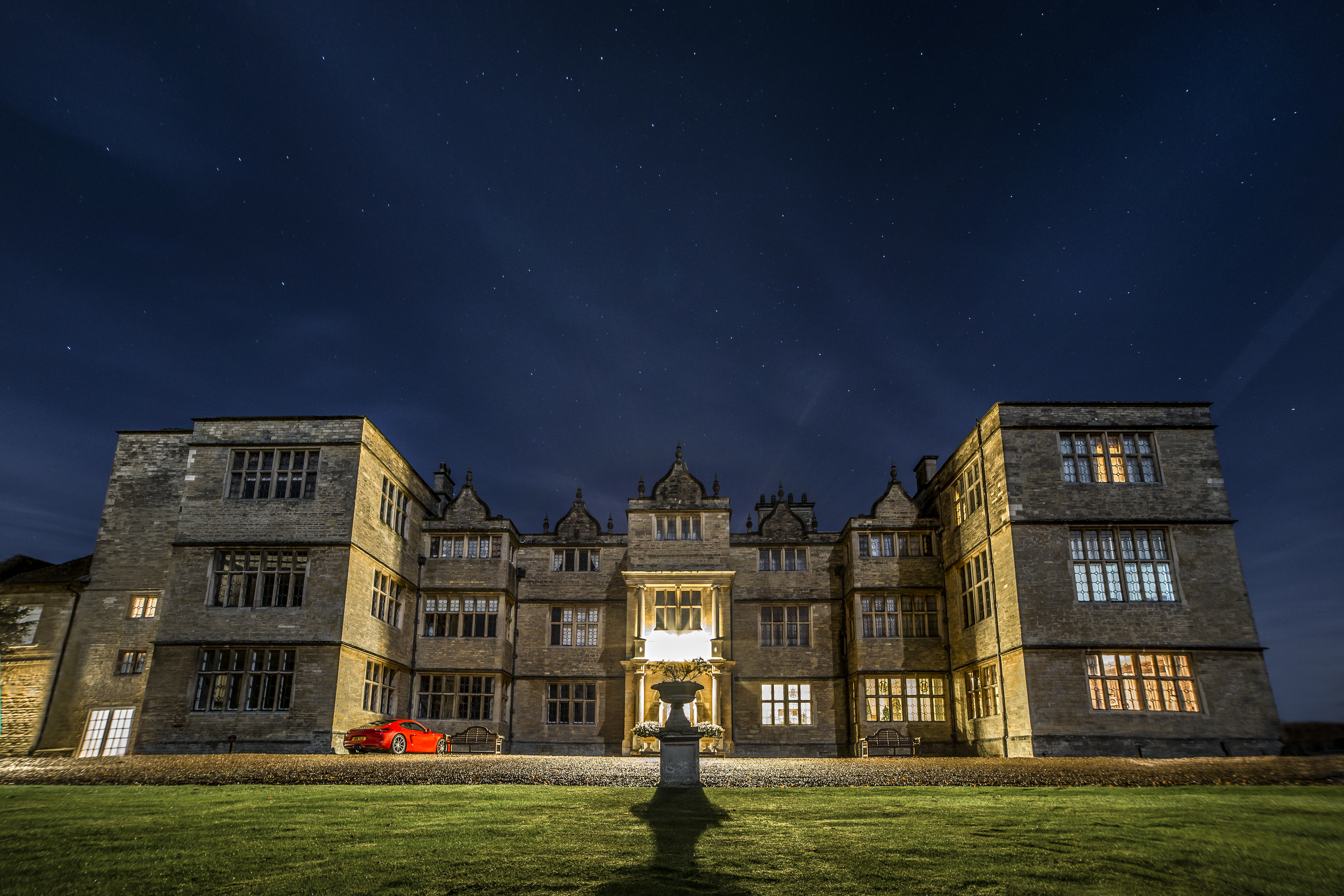
- The house at night

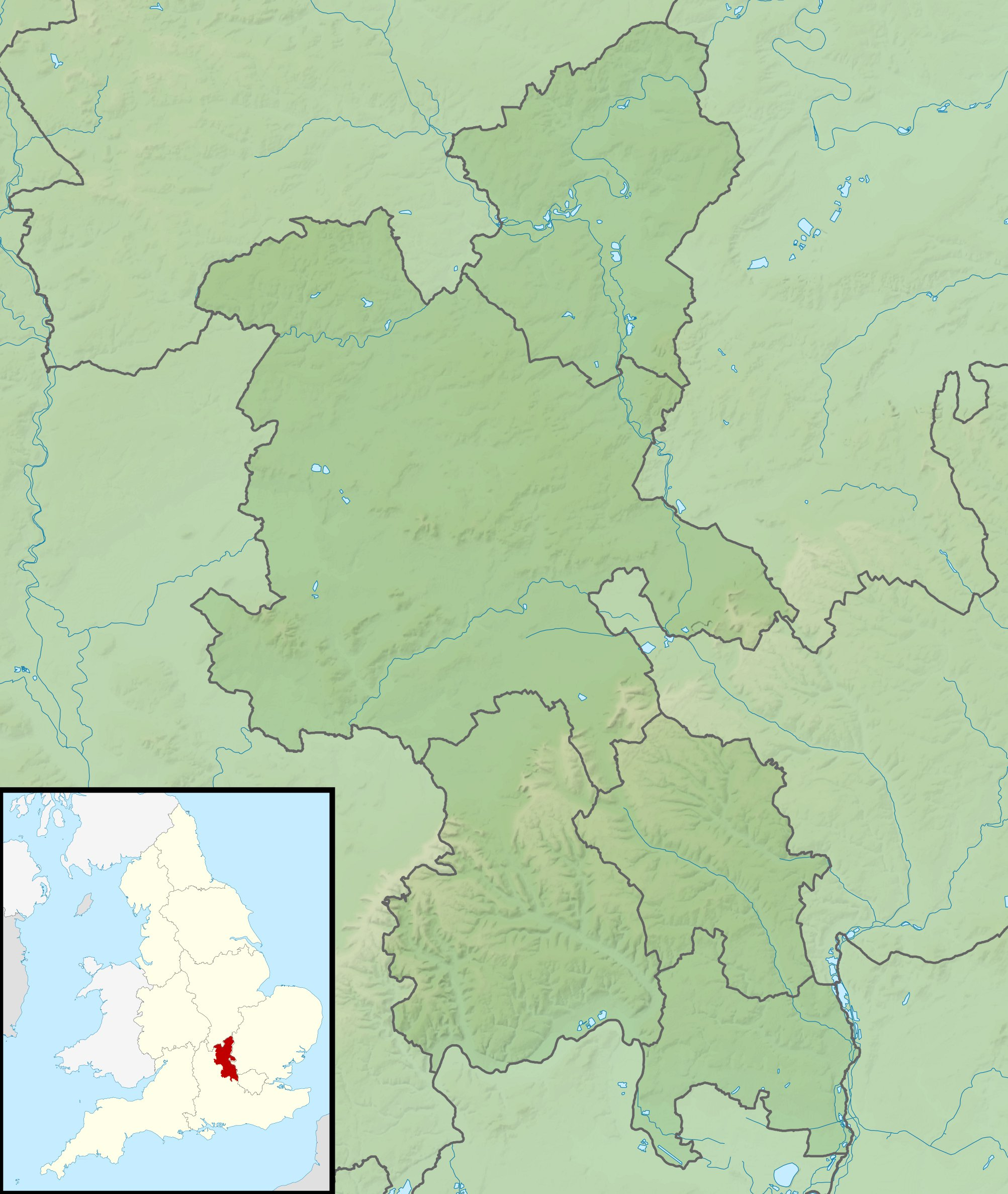
- Location within Buckinghamshire
- 52.1082°N 0.7666°W
- Type: House
- Location: Milton Keynes, Buckinghamshire, England

History
- Built: 1597-C1603

Site notes
- Architectural style: Elizabethan
- Governing body: Privately owned

Listed Building – Grade I
- Official name: Flats 13-26, Gayhurst Court
- Designated: 3 March 1952
- Reference no.: 1115951

Listed Building – Grade II*
- Official name: Stone pedestals to NW and SE of Gayhurst House (Gayhurst Court)
- Designated: 27 February 1984
- Reference no.: 1115913

Listed Building – Grade II*
- Official name: Gayhurst Court Mews
- Designated: 17 November 1966
- Reference no.: 1211955

Listed Building – Grade II*
- Official name: Former Servants Lavatory (Cerberus Privy) at Gayhurst House (Part of 12 Gayhurst Court Mews)
- Designated: 27 February 1984
- Reference no.: 1320166

Listed Building – Grade II*
- Official name: Gayhurst Court Mews (The Dovecote) and Attached Gate Piers
- Designated: 17 November 1966
- Reference no.: 1115911

Gayhurst House (now known as Gayhurst Court) is a late-Elizabethan country house in Buckinghamshire. It is located near the village of Gayhurst, several kilometres north of Milton Keynes. The earliest house dates from the 1520s. In 1597 it was greatly expanded by William Moulsoe. His son-in-law, Everard Digby, completed the rebuilding, prior to his execution in 1606 for participating in the Gunpowder Plot. The house was subsequently owned by the Wrightes, and latterly the Carringtons. Robert Carrington engaged William Burges who undertook much remodelling of both the house and the estate, although his plans for Gayhurst were more extensive still. In the 20th century, the Carringtons sold the house, although retaining much of the surrounding estate. It is now divided into flats, with further housing in the surrounding estate buildings.

The house and the adjacent Church of St Peter are Grade I listed buildings and many of the buildings in the grounds have separate listings. Gayhurst House is not open to the public, although it can be seen from the footpath leading to the church.

== History ==
The house was built in the early sixteenth-century on the site of a Roman villa and Norman manor. It was expanded in 1597 by William Moulsoe. (Note: The spelling of Moulsoe varies, including Mulshaw, Mulsho, Moulso, and Mulso.) The house was completed by his son-in-law, Sir Everard Digby, one of the conspirators involved in the Gunpowder Plot. In spite of the Digby family's disgrace and Everard's execution, his widow, Mary was able to retain the property. Both of their sons, John and Kenelm, were strong Royalists in the English Civil War, during which parliamentary troops were billeted at Gayhurst and an inscription in the porch showing an 'X' and the date 1649 is said to record the execution of Charles I. The estate was subsequently inherited by Sir Kenelm Digby, the courtier, diplomat and natural philosopher, whose initials are inscribed on stone pillars in the gardens. In 1704 the estate was sold to Sir Nathan Wrighte.

The house was extensively refurbished, 1858–72, by William Burges for Robert Carrington, 2nd Baron Carrington, and his son. Lord Carrington was Burges' first significant patron. (Note: Robert Carrington was a noted eccentric. Believing his posterior to be made of glass, he "used to discharge [his] legislative and judicial functions standing". When the journalist Grenville Murray revealed Carrington's "laughable hallucination", Carrington's son horsewhipped him on the steps of the Conservative Club.) In total, some £30,000 was spent which did not include the costs of construction for Burges' planned main staircase that was never built. However, a minor stair, the Caliban Stair, was constructed.

During the Second World War a Bombe outstation to the Government Code and Cypher School at Bletchley Park was based at Gayhurst House. This was one of five Bombe outstations; Wavendon, Adstock Manor, Gayhurst, Eastcote and Stanmore which operated Bombe machines used in the breaking of the Enigma Code. By the end of the war the outstations operated over 200 Bombes operated on an inter-service basis with the installation and maintenance completed mainly by RAF and civilian personnel, and operated by WRNS.'OSG' (Outstation Gayhurst) was opened in September 1942 and operated 5 Bombes.

The estate was broken up in the twentieth century and the house was converted into 14 flats between 1971 and 1979.

== Architecture and description ==
William Moulsoe's house of 1597 was built to a traditional Elizabethan E-plan with projecting wings and a central porch with Doric columns on the south, entrance, front. The matching wings on the north front were infilled during the ownership of the younger George Wrighte, using a Palladian style. The house is of three storeys and seven bays and is built of coursed limestone.

Burges planned a full scheme of reconstruction for the 2nd Lord Carrington, including a new tower and a long gallery. Not all of this was carried out, but much of his plans for internal redecoration were undertaken. The style chosen was Anglo/French Renaissance, which Burges considered in keeping with the date of Moulsoe's rebuilding. Rooms contain some of his most splendid fireplaces, with carving by Burges' long-time collaborator Thomas Nicholls, in particular those in the Drawing Room which include motifs from Paradise Lost and Paradise Regained. Burges's contributions to the house were not always appreciated, an undated and anonymous guidebook, probably dating from the 1970s, described his work thus; "Burges made considerable alterations and additions, mostly of a disastrous nature." This view is not general; Burges's biographer, J. Mordaunt Crook, notes the inventiveness he displayed in the Abbess's Room, and considers the Cerberus Privy "one of Burges's happiest inventions." (Note: Crook notes the influence of Château of Blois on the colourful decorative scheme for the Abbess's Room. He also suggests Harlaxton Manor as another source for Burges's overall interior scheme.)

The estate has a fine series of out-buildings including a seventeenth-century dovecote, turreted stables, a brewhouse, bakehouse and dog kennels. Perhaps the most extraordinary addition is the Male Servants' Lavatory, known as the Cerberus Privy, a large circular privy based on the Abbot's kitchen at Glastonbury and surmounted by a, now-eyeless, statue of Cerberus.

The park was laid out by Capability Brown and remodelled by Humphry Repton. Burges undertook the design of a series of formal gardens in an appropriate Jacobethan style but much of these has been lost during the redevelopment of the house in the late 20th-century. The ten carved stone pedestals Burges designed remain in situ.

=== St Peter's Church ===
The Church of St Peter stands directly to the east of the house. Nikolaus Pevsner described the church, house, and the stables to the west, as a "very fine group". The present church was built in 1728, on the site of an earlier church, by George Wrighte, in accordance with his father's will. The architect is unknown and the 2003 revision of the Buckinghamshire Pevsner Buildings of England series considers it "very awkwardly put together". The interior contains a memorial monument to George Wrighte and his son, Sir Nathan, the purchaser of the house in the early 18th-century, which Pevsner calls "one of the grandest of its type in England".

=== Listing designations ===
Gayhurst House and St Peter's Church are both Grade I listed buildings. Burges' Cerberus privy, and the service range he redeveloped, now converted to houses, are listed at Grade II*. The pedestals Burges built as part of his creation of a formal garden are also listed Grade II*, as is the 17th-century dovecote. The former stable block, now also converted to houses, is listed at Grade II. The lodge at the entrance to the drive, formerly the Sir Francis Drake public house and now derelict, is also listed at Grade II. The landscaped park and formal gardens of Gayhurst are Grade II listed on the Register of Historic Parks and Gardens.

== Gallery ==
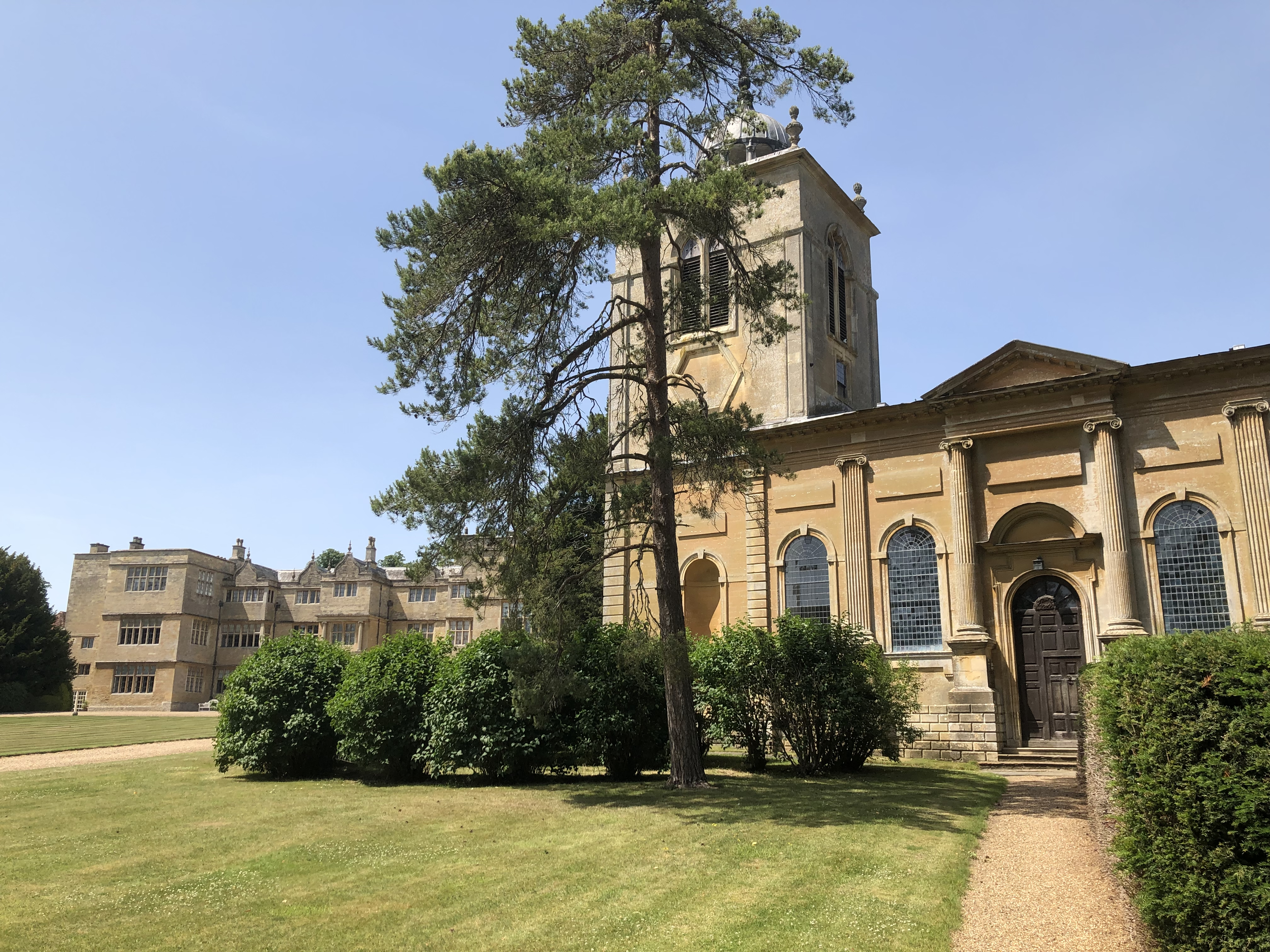
The Church of St Peter and Gayhurst House

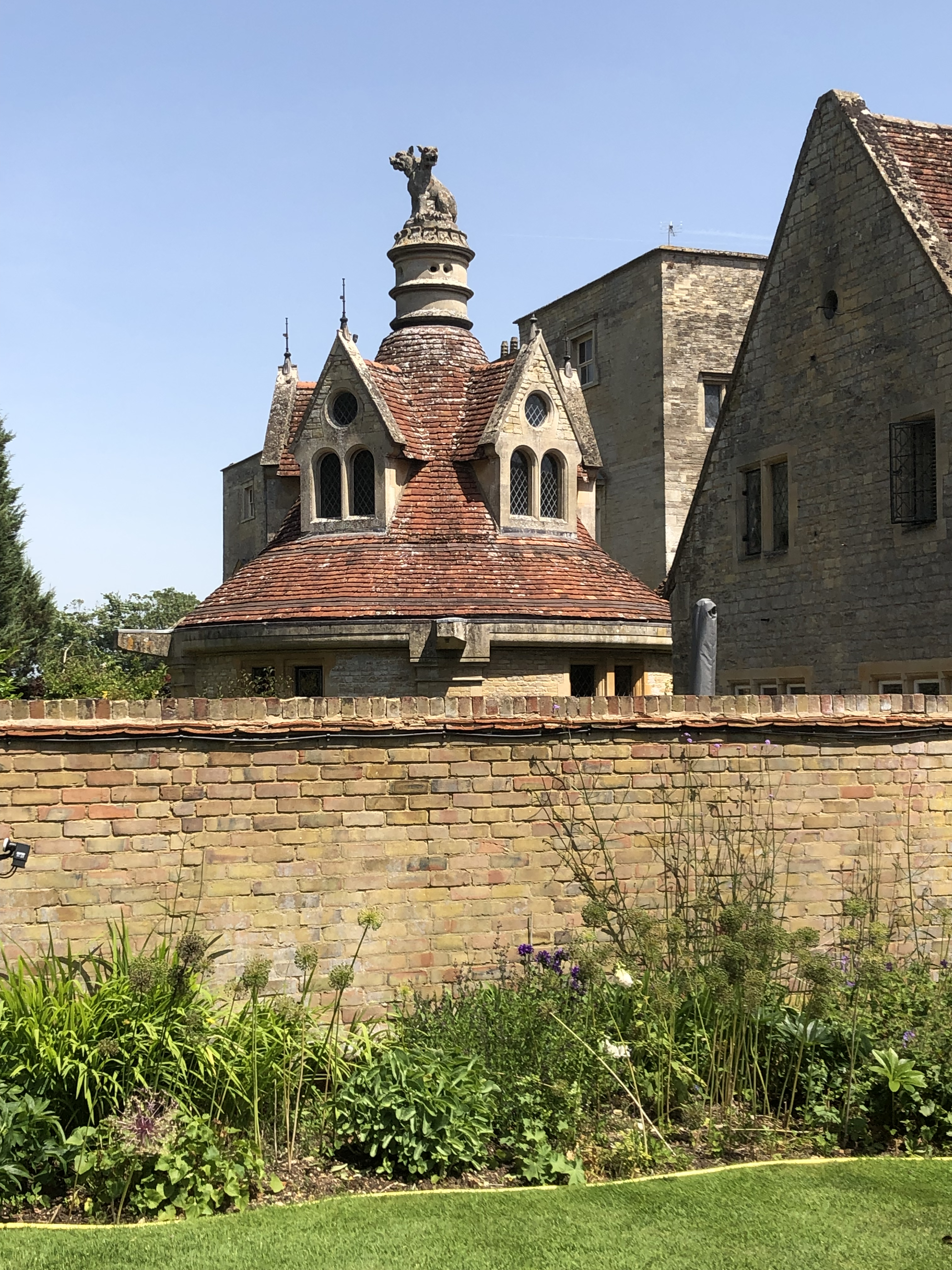
The Cerberus Privy

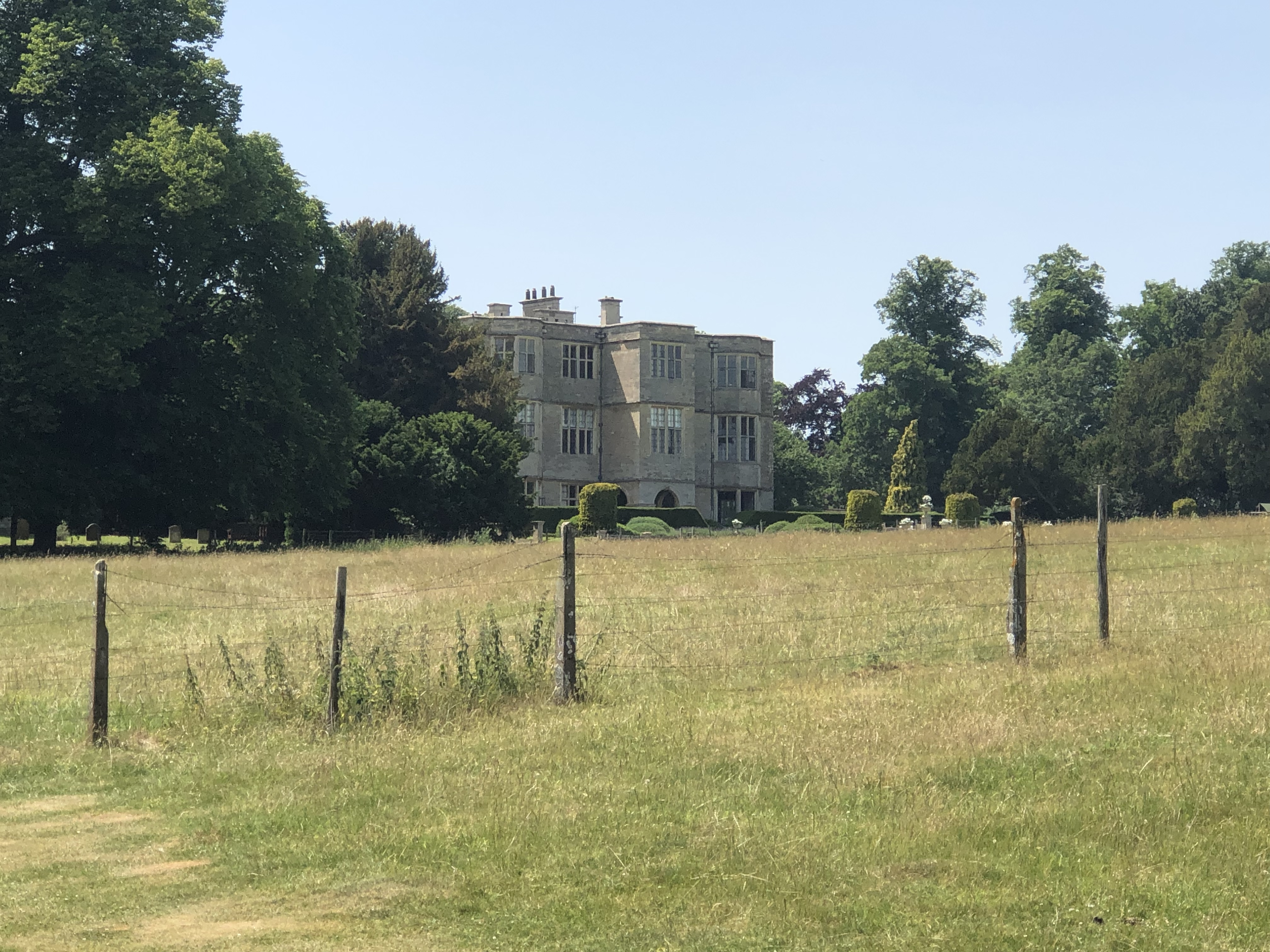
A distant view

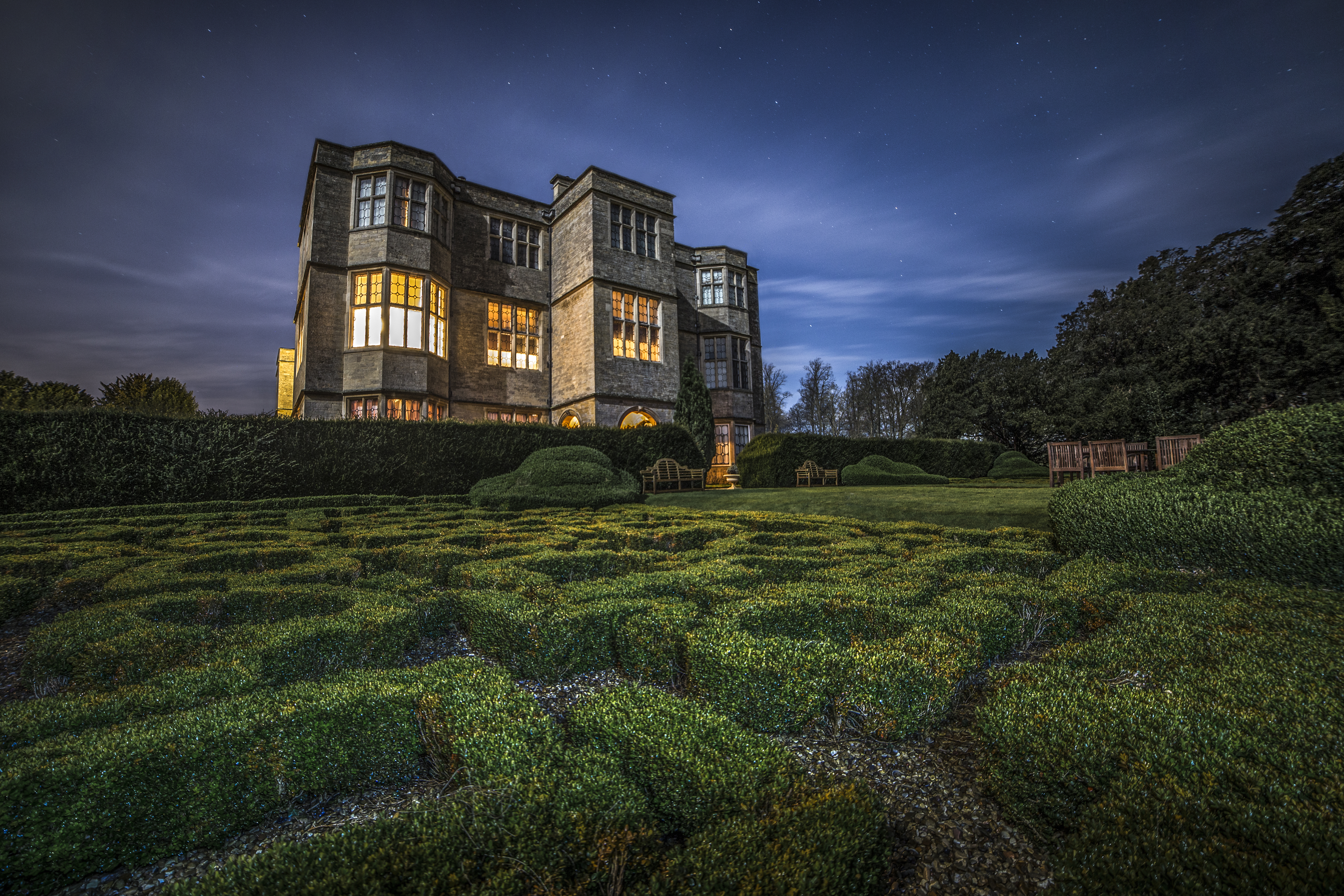
A view from the maze

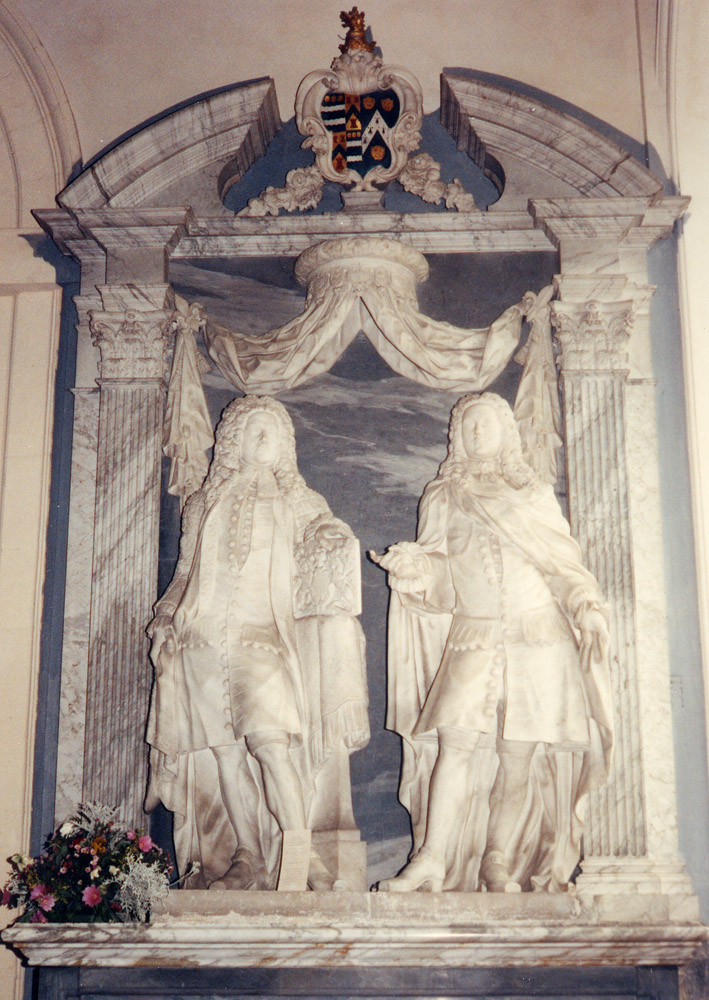
The Wrighte Monument in St Peter's

== Sources ==
- Pevsner, Nikolaus; Williamson, Elizabeth (2003). Buckinghamshire. The Buildings of England. New Haven, US and London: Yale University Press. ISBN 0-300-09584-8.
- Crook, J. Mordaunt (2013). William Burges and the High Victorian Dream. London: Frances Lincoln. ISBN 978-0-711-23349-2. OCLC 995483842.
