= Thomas Windsor, 1st Viscount Windsor =

British soldier and politician

Lieutenant-General Thomas Windsor, 1st Viscount Windsor (c. 1670 – 8 June 1738), styled The Honourable Thomas Windsor until 1699, was a British Army officer, landowner and Tory politician who sat in the English and British House of Commons between 1685 and 1712. He was then elevated to the British House of Lords as one of Harley's Dozen.

== Life ==
Windsor was the second son of Thomas Hickman-Windsor, 1st Earl of Plymouth, by his second wife Ursula Widdrington, daughter and co-heiress of Sir Thomas Widdrington, Lord Chief Baron of the Exchequer, and Frances Fairfax.

He was made a Page of Honour to James II in 1685 (a post he held until the king was deposed in 1688) and a few months later was returned to Parliament for Droitwich, despite being only around sixteen at the time. Lord Willoughby de Eresby wanted both him and Peter Legh (died 1744) expelled as minors. Windsor took no part in the proceedings of Parliament and was not re-elected in 1687.

During the Monmouth Rebellion of 1685 Windsor had served as a cornet in Lord Plymouth's Horse under his father. He continued to serve in the Army as a captain in Sir John Fenwick's Regiment in 1687, as a lieutenant-colonel in Viscount Colchester's Regiment between 1690 and 1694, as a colonel of horse between 1694 and 1697, 1702 and 1707 and 1711 and 1712 and of the 3rd Dragoon Guards between 1712 and 1717. He was promoted to brigadier in 1702, to major-general in 1704 and to lieutenant-general in 1710.

In 1692 he was appointed Groom of the Bedchamber in King William's private household, serving until the King's death in 1702. In 1699 he was elevated to the Peerage of Ireland as Viscount Windsor, of Blackcastle. This being an Irish peerage he was still eligible for election to the English House of Commons, and in 1705 he was once again returned to Parliament for Bramber, a seat he held until 1708. Between 1708 and 1712 he represented Monmouthshire. The latter year he was created an English peer as Baron Mountjoy, in the Isle of Wight, as one of twelve peers created to secure a Tory majority in the House of Lords.

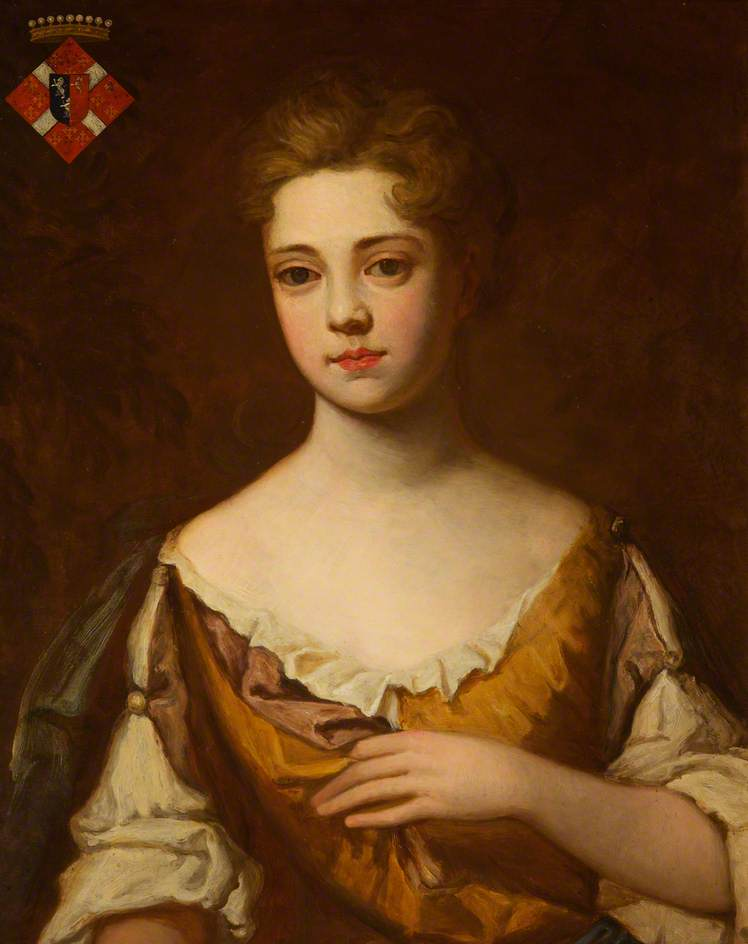
Lady Charlotte Herbert (d.1733), Later Lady Windsor, Daughter of the 7th Earl of Pembroke

Lord Windsor married Lady Charlotte Herbert, only daughter of Philip Herbert, 7th Earl of Pembroke, and Henriette de Kéroualle (sister of Louise de Kéroualle, the principal mistress to King Charles II of England), and widow of John Jeffreys, 2nd Baron Jeffreys, in 1703. In 1709, they brought a petition to the House of Lords (which adjudicated on matters of noble titles and estates) seeking permission to sell the Jeffreys estates in order to pay their debts.

They had six children: two sons and at least four daughters:

- Hon.Thomas Philip (baptised 6.2.1706 St.Luke's, Chelsea)
- Herbert Windsor, 2nd Viscount Windsor (1707–1758) ⚭ 1735 Alice Clavering
- Hon. Ursula Windsor ⚭ 1736 John Wadman
- Hon. Charlotte Windsor ⚭ 1736 John Kent
- Hon. Catharine Windsor (1716–1742) ⚭ Mattheus Lestevenon (1715–1797),
- a daughter who died at a young age

Charlotte died in November 1733. Lord Windsor died in June 1738 and was succeeded in his titles by his son, Herbert.

He inherited the Lower Avon Navigation from his father, who had acquired the rights to it from the future King James II of England.

Parliament of England
Preceded by Hon. Henry Coventry; Samuel Sandys I	Member of Parliament for Droitwich; 1685–1687; With: Samuel Sandys II	Succeeded by Samuel Sandys II; The Lord Coote
Preceded by John Asgill; Samuel Sambrooke	Member of Parliament for Bramber; 1705–1707; With: John Asgill	Succeeded by Parliament of Great Britain
Parliament of Great Britain
Preceded by Parliament of England	Member of Parliament for Bramber; 1707–1708; With: William Shippen	Succeeded by William Hale; Sir Cleave More, Bt
Preceded by John Morgan; Sir Hopton Williams, Bt	Member of Parliament for Monmouthshire; 1708–1712; With: John Morgan	Succeeded by John Morgan; James Gunter
Military offices
Preceded by Cornelius Wood	Colonel of Viscount Windsor's Regiment of Horse; 1712–1616	Succeeded by George Wade
Peerage of Ireland
New creation	Viscount Windsor; 1699–1738	Succeeded by Herbert Windsor
Peerage of Great Britain
New creation	Baron Mountjoy; 1712–1738	Succeeded by Herbert Windsor
