= John Thurlow Brace =

John Thurloe Brace (born c. 1685) of Astwood, Buckinghamshire was a British landowner and politician who sat in the House of Commons between 1715 and 1728.

Brace was the eldest surviving son of Francis Brace, an attorney of Bedford, and his second wife Anne Thurloe, daughter of John Thurloe, who was secretary to Oliver Cromwell. He was educated at Bedford School and was admitted at Trinity College, Cambridge on 8 January 1702, aged 16. He was admitted at Inner Temple in 1705. He succeeded his father in 1712 and inherited the estate of Astwood, near Bedford, through his mother. Before 1716, he married Anna Maria Harris.

Brace, was returned as a Whig Member of Parliament for Bedford at the 1715 general election and voted with the Administration in all recorded divisions. At the 1722 general election he was defeated by George Huxley, but when Huxley accepted a place in 1725, Brace recovered his seat at Bedford at the ensuing by-election on 9 June 1725. At the 1727 general election Brace was re-elected, but there was a petition and he stood down on 16 April 1728 under a compromise. Shortly after 1735 he sold Astwood to the executors of the 1st Lord Trevor.

The date of his death is not known, but he left a son and daughter. William Cole, the antiquary, said of him ‘lived a loose kind of life and run out his estate; but he was a man of parts and ingenuity’.

Parliament of Great Britain
Preceded by Samuel Rolt; John Cater	Member of Parliament for Bedford; 1715–1722; With: William Farrer	Succeeded by William Farrer; George Huxley
Preceded by William Farrer; George Huxley	Member of Parliament for Bedford; 1725–1728; With: William Farrer 1725-1727; John Orlebar 1727-1728	Succeeded by John Orlebar; James Metcalfe
