= John Orlebar =

British lawyer and Whig politician

John Orlebar (1697–1765), of Hinwick House, Bedfordshire, was a British lawyer and Whig politician who sat in the House of Commons from 1727 to 1734.

Orlebar was the only son of John Orlebar of Red Lion Square London, master in Chancery, and his wife Elizabeth, Whitfield. daughter of John Whitfield of Ives Place, Maidenhead, Berkshire. He was educated at Eton College from 1707 to 1715. He was admitted at Middle Temple on 26 November 1707 and matriculated from King's College, Cambridge at Easter 1715. On 27 May 1720, he was called to the bar. In 1721, he succeeded his father. He married Mary Rolt, daughter of Samuel Rolt, MP of Milton Ernest, Bedfordshire, on 29 December 1729.

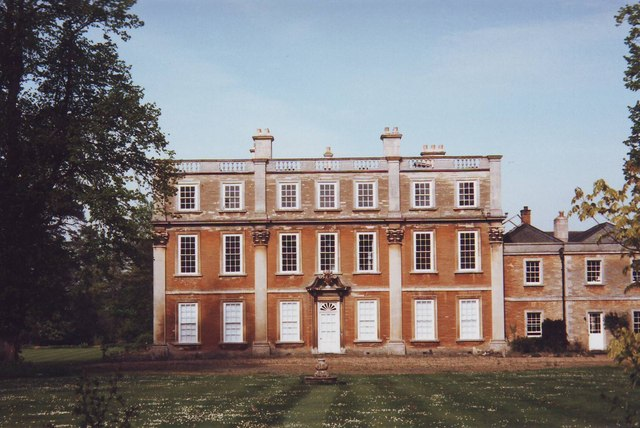
Hinwick House

Orlebar was returned in a contest as a Whig Member of Parliament for Bedford at the 1727 British general election. He voted with the Administration in all recorded divisions. In 1728 the Whig members of the Bedford corporation tried to turn out their Tory recorder, Lord Bruce, by legal proceedings, and offered the prospective vacancy to Orlebar. However nothing came of it. He succeeded his cousin Richard Orlebar at Hinwick in 1733. He did not stand again, at the 1734 British general election. In 1738, he was given a place as Commissioner of excise. He became a bencher of Middle Temple in 1742 and Treasurer in 1751.

Orlebar died on 19 December 1765, leaving a son and four daughters. Several of his letters, describing parliamentary proceedings between 1739 and 1742, were printed in vol. iii of Coxe's Walpole.

Parliament of Great Britain
Preceded by William Farrer; John Thurlow Brace	Member of Parliament for Bedford, 1727 – 1734; With: John Thurlow Brace; James Metcalfe 1728; Sir Jeremy Vanacker Sambrooke, Bt 1731	Succeeded by Samuel Ongley; Sir Jeremy Vanacker Sambrooke, Bt
