= John Asgill =

English and Irish lawyer and politician

- Born: 25 March 1659
- Died: 10 November 1738 (aged 79)
- Occupation(s): lawyer, politician, pamphleteer
- Notable work: An Argument Proving, that … Man may be Translated

John Asgill (25 March 1659 – 10 November 1738) was an eccentric English writer and politician.

== Life ==
Asgill attended Nonconformist (Protestantism) services in his youth. He studied law at the Middle Temple, 1686, and was called to the bar in 1692. He founded the first land bank in 1695 with Nicholas Barbon, which, after proving to be a profitable venture, merged with the land bank of John Briscoe in 1696. However, after profits dropped, the bank closed in 1699. He was then elected that year as Member of Parliament for Bramber.

In 1700 Asgill had published An Argument Proving, that … Man may be Translated, a pamphlet aiming to prove that death was not obligatory upon Christians, which, much to his surprise, caused a public outcry and led to his expulsion from the Irish House of Commons in 1703, only a short time after he had stood successfully for Enniscorthy. He had moved to Ireland where the act for returning the forfeited estates which had been given away by William was providing work for lawyers.

Whilst in Ireland he had been re-elected to the English House of Commons for Bramber in 1702 and so returned to England. On 12 June 1707 he was arrested and imprisoned at Fleet Prison for debt; he claimed parliamentary immunity as a member of a current parliament despite the confusion whether the last English parliament and the first Parliament of Great Britain were the same body, and in December the House of Commons agreed. Nevertheless, two days after ordering his release from prison, he was expelled from the Commons for authoring a blasphemous book.

He fell on hard times, and passed the rest of his life between the Fleet prison and the King's Bench, but his zeal as a pamphleteer continued unabated.

== Notes ==
Attribution

Parliament of Ireland
| Preceded by Richard Barry; John Seymour | Member of Parliament for Enniscorthy; 1703; Served alongside: Morley Saunders | Succeeded by Morley Saunders; William Berry |
Parliament of England
| Preceded by Francis Seymour-Conway; Thomas Owen | Member of Parliament for Bramber; 1702–1707; With: Francis Seymour-Conway; John Middleton; Samuel Sambrooke; The Viscount Windsor | Succeeded by The Viscount Windsor; William Shippen |
