= Sambrooke baronets =

Extinct baronetcy in the Baronetage of England

The Vanacker, later Sambrooke Baronetcy, of London, was a title in the Baronetage of England. It was created on 31 January 1701 for the Turkey Merchant Nicholas Vanacker, with a remainder failing male issue of his own or his brother John Vanacker to Sir Jeremy Sambrooke and the heirs male of his body. The Vanacker line failed on the death of the second Baronet in 1711 and the title was inherited by Sir Samuel Sambrooke, the third Baronet, who sat as Member of Parliament for Bramber and Great Bedwyn. The fourth Baronet was a Member of Parliament for Bedford. The title became extinct on the death of the fifth Baronet in 1754.

Escutcheon of the Vanacker, later Sambrooke baronets of London

== Vanacker, later Sambrooke baronets, of London (1701) ==
- Sir Nicholas Vanacker, 1st Baronet (c. 1651–1702)
- Sir John Vanacker, 2nd Baronet (died 1711)
- Sir Samuel Vanacker Sambrooke, 3rd Baronet (c. 1677–1714)
- Sir Jeremy Vanacker Sambrooke, 4th Baronet (c. 1703–1740)
- Sir Jeremy Sambrooke, 5th Baronet (died 1754)
