= George Huxley =

English politician (1687–1744)

Member of Parliament for Bedford
- In office 1722–1725
- Preceded by: William Farrer; John Thurlow Brace
- Succeeded by: William Farrer; John Thurlow Brace

Member of Parliament for Newport (Isle of Wight)
- In office 1726–1741
- Preceded by: Colonel Charles Cadogan; The Lord Whitworth
- Succeeded by: Anthony Chute; Monoux Cope

Personal details
- Born: 1687
- Died: 19 July 1744 (aged 56–57)
- Education: Clare College, Cambridge

George Huxley (c. 1687 – 19 July 1744), of Stoke, Buckinghamshire, was a British politician and member of parliament who sat in the British House of Commons from 1722 to 1741.

== Biography ==
Huxley was the eldest son of Thomas Huxley of Bow, Middlesex, and his wife Arabella Becher, daughter of Sir William Becher of Howbury, Bedfordshire. He was admitted at Clare College, Cambridge on 3 May 1704 and at Middle Temple on 15 May 1704.

Huxley was elected Member of Parliament for Bedford in the 1722 British general election. In 1725, he was appointed a Victualling Commissioner but lost his seat in the by-election on 28 May 1725. The Government brought him in as MP for Newport (Isle of Wight) at a by-election on 1 February 1726, and he voted with the Administration in all recorded divisions. He was re-elected at the 1727 British general election. In 1729, he was appointed muster-master general with a salary of £800. He was returned unopposed at the 1734 British general election. He did not stand in the 1741 British general election

Huxley died on 19 July 1744. He had one son.

Parliament of Great Britain
Preceded by William Farrer; John Thurlow Brace	Member of Parliament for Bedford; 1722–1725; With: William Farrer	Succeeded by William Farrer; John Thurlow Brace
Preceded by Colonel Charles Cadogan; The Lord Whitworth	Member of Parliament for Newport (Isle of Wight); 1726–1741; With: Colonel Charles Cadogan 1726–1727; Sir William Willys 1727; William Fortescue1727–1736; The Viscount Boyne 1736–1741	Succeeded by Anthony Chute; Monoux Cope
