= William Fortescue (judge) =

British judge and politician (1687–1749)

The Right Honourable Sir William Fortescue
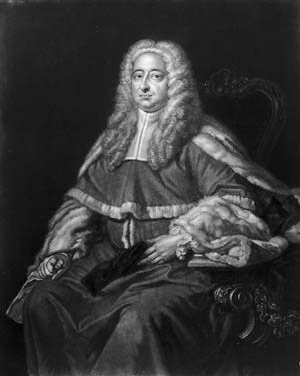

Master of the Rolls
- In office 5 November 1741 – 16 December 1749
- Preceded by: Sir John Verney
- Succeeded by: Sir John Strange

Attorney General for the Duchy of Cornwall
- In office 1730–1736
- Preceded by: William Lee
- Succeeded by: Robert Pauncefort

Personal details
- Born: 1687
- Died: 16 December 1749 (aged 61–62)
- Education: Trinity College, Oxford
- Profession: Barrister, judge, politician

Sir William Fortescue, PC (1687 – 16 December 1749) of Buckland Filleigh, Devon, was a British judge and Master of the Rolls 1741–1749.

== Origins ==
Fortescue was the only son and heir of Henry Fortescue (1659–1691) of Buckland Filleigh by his wife Agnes Dennis, daughter of Edward Dennis of Barnstaple, North Devon. The manor of Buckland Filleigh had been acquired by his 6-times great-grandfather William Fortescue (d.1548), the 2nd son of Martin Fortescue (d.1472), who had married the heiress of Filleigh (later the seat of his descendant Earl Fortescue) and Weare Giffard. Martin was the son and heir of Sir John Fortescue (c. 1394 – c. 1480) of Ebrington in Gloucestershire, Chief Justice of the King's Bench of England and the author of De Laudibus Legum Angliæ and was the nephew of the latter's elder brother Sir Henry Fortescue (fl. 1426), Lord Chief Justice of the Common Pleas in Ireland.

== Education ==
Fortescue was educated at Barnstaple Grammar School in North Devon, where he met the poet John Gay (1685–1732), who become a lifelong friend. He matriculated at Trinity College, Oxford in 1705.

== Judicial career ==
The early death of Fortescue's wife prompted him to become a barrister, and he was admitted to the Middle Temple in 1714, and transferred to the Inner Temple later in the same year before his call to the Bar in July 1715.

Fortescue was a "sound and businesslike" barrister, and a "good lawyer", and built up a strong practice. He first became involved in politics in 1724 when Robert Walpole, Chancellor of the Exchequer, employed him as his secretary. In 1727 he was returned as a Member of Parliament for Newport, on the Isle of Wight, and despite his duties in Parliament and as secretary to Walpole he continued his practice as a barrister. In 1730 he became a King's Counsel, and in the same year was made Attorney General to the Duchy of Cornwall. On 9 February 1736 he was appointed a Baron of the Exchequer, having resigned as an MP and as Attorney General. He was transferred to the Court of Common Pleas on 7 July 1738, replacing John Comyns, and on 5 November 1741 he succeeded Sir John Verney as Master of the Rolls and became a Privy Councillor on 19 November. He remained Master of the Rolls until his death on 15 December 1749.

== Literary career ==
As well as his work as a barrister and judge, Fortescue was also involved in the London literary scene, having been introduced by his school friend John Gay to Alexander Pope, and he became a founding member of the Scriblerus Club. He was a co-author with Pope of "Stradling versus Stiles", and Pope dedicated his Imitation of the First Satire of Horace to him.

== Marriage and children ==
On 7 July 1709 he married his cousin, Mary Fortescue (d.1710), daughter of Edmund Fortescue (1660–1734) of East Allington, from a junior branch of the Fortescues of Fallapit in the parish of East Allington, Devon, descended from Sir Henry Fortescue (fl. 1426), Lord Chief Justice of the Common Pleas in Ireland, who had married the heiress of Fallapit. Mary died an early death on 1 August 1710 and her monument exists in St Andrew's Church, East Allington. Mary and William had a daughter, who was their sole heiress:

- Mary Fortescue (1710–1752), who inherited the estate of Fallapit from her mother. She married John Spooner and produced an only daughter Mary Fortescue (d.1747) who died an infant.

== Death ==
Fortescue died on 16 December 1749 aged 63 and was buried in the Rolls Chapel in London, where exists his monument.

== Arms ==
Coat of arms of Sir William Fortescue
| Escutcheon Azure, a bend engrailed argent plain cottised or Motto Forte Scutum Salus Ducum (Latin for A Strong Shield is the Salvation of Leaders) |

== Bibliography ==
- Foss, Edward (1865). Tabulae Curiales: Tables of the Superior Courts of Westminster Hall.
- Foss, Edward (1870). A Biographical Dictionary of the Justices of England (1066–1870). Spottiswoode and Company.

Parliament of Great Britain
| Preceded by Sir William Willys; George Huxley | Member of Parliament for Newport (Isle of Wight); 1727–1736; With: George Huxley | Succeeded by Viscount Boyle; George Huxley |
Legal offices
| Preceded by John Comyns | Baron of the Exchequer; 9 February 1736 – 7 July 1738 | Succeeded by Thomas Parker |
| Preceded by John Comyns | Justice of the Common Pleas; 7 July 1738 – 5 November 1741 | Succeeded by Thomas Burnet |
| Preceded by Sir John Verney | Master of the Rolls; 5 November 1741 – 15 December 1749 | Succeeded by Sir John Strange |
