= John Crawley (MP) =

British politician (1703–1767)

The Right Honourable John Crawley

Member of Parliament for Marlborough
- In office 1737–1747 Serving with Francis Seymour, Sir John Hynde Cotton, Bt
- Preceded by: Edward Lisle; Francis Seymour
- Succeeded by: Sir John Hynde Cotton, Bt; John Talbot

High Sheriff of Bedfordshire
- In office 18 December 1735 – 18 January 1737
- Preceded by: Thomas Groome
- Succeeded by: Francis Jessop

Personal details
- Born: 26 April 1703
- Died: 9 September 1767 (aged 64)
- Spouse: Susannah Sambrooke (after 1740)
- Relations: Samuel Dashwood (grandfather); Samuel Crawley (grandson)
- Children: 4
- Parent(s): Richard Crawley; Sarah Dashwood

John Crawley (26 April 1703 – 9 September 1767) was an English landowner and politician.

== Early life ==
Crawley was born on 26 April 1703 in an old Luton family. He was the eldest son of Sarah (née Dashwood) Crawley, and Richard Crawley, Registrar of the Admiralty and MP for Wendover. Among his siblings were Sarah Crawley and Samuel Crawley, British consul in Smyrna.

His maternal grandparents were Anne (née Smith) Dashwood (a daughter of John Smith of Tedworth and sister to John Smith, Chancellor of the Exchequer) and Sir Samuel Dashwood, Lord Mayor of London and MP for the City of London. His paternal grandparents were Mary (née Clutterbuck) Crawley (a daughter of London merchant Richard Clutterbuck) and Francis Crawley of Northaw, Baron of the Exchequer (son of Sir Francis Crawley, who was appointed Justice of the Common Pleas by the king in 1632, but was disabled by Parliament).

== Career ==
He succeeded to his father's estates in 1712. He was High Sheriff of Bedfordshire from 1735 to 1737. In 1740, Crawley built Stockwood House in Luton, which his father bought in 1708.

In 1734, Crawley unsuccessfully contested Great Bedwyn as a Tory on the interest of the Bruce family, who had a long connection with Bedfordshire. Three years later Lord Bruce was able to provide him with a seat at Marlborough until 1747, after which he did not stand. In Parliament he voted against the Administration in all recorded divisions.

== Personal life ==
On 29 May 1740, Crawley married Susannah Sambrooke, a daughter of Sir Samuel Sambrooke, 3rd Baronet, of Bush Hill, Edmonton. Her brother was Sir Jeremy Sambrooke, 4th Baronet, MP for Bedford. Together, they were the parents of two sons and two daughters, including:

- John Crawley (1743–1815), who married Elizabeth Hawley, a daughter of Dr. James Hawley of Leybourne Grange; her brother was Sir Henry Hawley, 1st Baronet.
- Susanna Crawley (1744–1830), who married the Rev. John Keet.
- Sarah Crawley, who in 1784 married Thomas Halsey of Gaddesden Place, MP for Hertfordshire.
- Samuel Crawley (d. 1805), who bought the Dunham estate and married Eliza Rankin, heiress of Ragnall Hall, in 1788.

Crawley died on 9 September 1767. His estates were inherited by his eldest son John. Upon John's death in 1815, the estates passed to his nephew, Samuel Crawley. His estate, Stockwood House, was demolished in 1964 and, today, is the site of Stockwood Park.

=== Descendants ===
Through his daughter Sarah, he was a grandfather of Sarah Halsey (d. 1864), who inherited the Halsey family estates and married Rev. John Fitz Moore and Joseph Thompson Whately (both of whom adopted the surname Halsey), MP for St Albans. Sarah's daughter, Georgiana Theodosia Halsey, married Col. Leopold Grimston Paget (youngest son of Berkeley Paget, MP, and a grandson of Henry Paget, 1st Earl of Uxbridge). Sarah's son Thomas Plumer Halsey, MP for Hertfordshire, whose descendants became the Halsey baronets.

Through his younger son Samuel, he was a grandfather of Samuel Crawley (1790–1852), who inherited the Stockwood, Dunham and Ragnall estates. He served as MP for Honiton and Bedford.

Parliament of Great Britain
Preceded by Edward Lisle; Francis Seymour	Member of Parliament for Marlborough; 1737–1747; With: Francis Seymour 1737–1741; Sir John Hynde Cotton, Bt 1741–1747	Succeeded by Sir John Hynde Cotton, Bt; John Talbot
Honorary titles
Preceded by Thomas Groome	High Sheriff of Bedfordshire; 1735–1737	Succeeded by Francis Jessop
