= Wavendon Manor =

Manor house in Wavendon, Buckinghamshire, England

Coordinates: 52°01′36″N 0°39′47″W

Wavendon Manor is a 16th-century house on Cross End Road, near Wavendon in Buckinghamshire. It is a Grade II listed building.

== World War II ==
During World War II the house was a Bombe outstation to the Government Code and Cypher School at Bletchley Park from March 1941. At the end of that year it housed five Bombes, and the site operated until January 1944, when the fourteen bombes were sent to other sites. Other outstations included Gayhurst, Adstock Manor, Eastcote and Stanmore.

After the war a group from TICOM including Lt. Paul Whitaker brought codebreaking equipment they had captured at Rosenheim, Bavaria, to the manor for testing against Soviet encrypted signals.
