= Richard Crawley (MP) =

English politician (1666 – 1713)

The Right Honourable Richard Crawley

Member of Parliament for Wendover
- In office 1702–1705 Serving with Richard Hampden
- Preceded by: Sir Roger Hill; Richard Hampden
- Succeeded by: Sir Roger Hill; Richard Hampden
- In office 1701–1702 Serving with Richard Hampden
- Preceded by: John Backwell; Richard Hampden
- Succeeded by: Sir Roger Hill; Richard Hampden

Personal details
- Born: 29 August 1666
- Died: 31 March 1713 (aged 46) Doctors' Commons, London
- Party: Tory
- Spouse: Sarah Dashwood (after 1699)
- Children: 7, including John Crawley
- Parent(s): Francis Crawley; Mary Clutterbuck

Richard Crawley (bp 29 August 1666 – 21 March 1713) was an English landowner and politician who served as an MP for Wendover and Registrar of the Admiralty and Court of Delegates.

== Early life ==
Crawley was baptized on 29 August 1666. He was the fourth, but third surviving son born to Mary (née Clutterbuck) Crawley and Francis Crawley of Northaw, Baron of the Exchequer. His eldest brother, John, died unmarried in 1694. His second brother Francis, died unmarried in Aleppo in 1680. His third brother, Thomas Crawley, served as Rector of Abinger and married Elizabeth Offley, but died without issue. His sister, Mary Crawley, married Cory Hayward of Hutton Hall and, after his death, Thomas Bedford. Another sister, Elizabeth Crawley, married John Hayward of Hutton Hall. His third sister, Margaret Hayward, married William Pyke, Rector of Black Notley.

Crawley's family had been established in Bedfordshire since the 15th century. His paternal grandfather was Sir Francis Crawley, who was appointed Justice of the Common Pleas by the king in 1632, but was disabled by Parliament. His maternal grandfather was London merchant Richard Clutterbuck.

== Career ==
As a younger son, Crawley entered the legal profession as a public notary, following in the footsteps of his brother-in-law, Thomas Bedford, who became Deputy Registrar of the Court of Admiralty during the reign of Charles II. Upon Bedford's death in 1698, Crawley succeeded him as Deputy Registrar, serving until 1705, when he became Registrar of the Admiralty following the death of Sir Orlando Gee, serving in that role until his death. He also served as Registrar of the Court of Delegates in c. 1700 until his death in 1713.

In November 1701 he was elected for Wendover and classed as a Tory by Robert Harley. He was active in his first session, working on the drafting committee of the bill to encourage privateers, into which his office would have given him an insight, and serving on the conference committee in after the Lords returned the bill. "He also acted as a teller on three occasions: against committing the bill for establishing Worcester College, Oxford; against a clause relating to the transport service being added to a supply bill; and against an amendment to leave out a clause in the bill preventing frauds in the salt duties."

He was defeated by Sir Roger Hill at the next election, before being seated on petition in November 1702. During this session, he "acted as a teller against the Lords' amendment to the bill extending the time for taking the abjuration oath. This was a crucial political division and his name appeared on the subsequent list of those voting with the Tories." In the following session he again acted as a teller on two more occasions.

At the 1705 election, Crawley stood in partnership with Sir Charles Hedges, but both were defeated. Despite his defeat, he continued to attend the Commons on occasion with information from the Court of Admiralty. "He declined to stand at Wendover in 1708, or in the 1709 by-election, but put up in 1710, when he was defeated and petitioned without result."

== Personal life ==
On 24 October 1699, Crawley married Sarah Dashwood, a younger daughter of Anne (née Smith) Dashwood (a daughter of John Smith of Tedworth and sister to John Smith, Chancellor of the Exchequer) and Sir Samuel Dashwood, Lord Mayor of London and MP for the City of London. Through his marriage, he acquired property in Wendover, around the same time he inherited a half-share in his mother's estate. Together, they were the parents of five daughters (of whom Anne and Mary died as infants, and Henrietta, Sarah and Margaret all died unmarried) and two sons, including:

- John Crawley (1703–1767), who married Susannah Sambrooke, a daughter of Sir Samuel Sambrooke, 3rd Baronet, of Bush Hill, Edmonton.
- Samuel Crawley (1705–1762), British consul in Smyrna; he married Maria Dunant, daughter of James Dunant of Constantinople. After his death, she married Daniel, Baron de Hochepied.

Under his brother's will, he inherited most of the family property. Crawley died in Doctors' Commons on 21 March 1713. He was buried at Someris Chapel, near Luton. He left the family estates in the Luton area, including the recently purchased Stockwood estate, to his eldest son, John. His widow received "the lands purchased since his marriage in the parish of Wendover and the 'copyhold tenement' at Northaw, Hertfordshire."

Parliament of England
Preceded by John Backwell; Richard Hampden	Member of Parliament for Wendover; 1702–1705; With: Richard Hampden	Succeeded by Sir Roger Hill; Richard Hampden
Preceded by Sir Roger Hill; Richard Hampden	Member of Parliament for Wendover; 1701–1702; With: Richard Hampden	Succeeded by Sir Roger Hill; Richard Hampden
