= Roger Hill (of Denham) =

English landowner, courtier and Whig politician

Sir Roger Hill (19 June 1642 – 29 December 1729) of Denham Place, Buckinghamshire was an English landowner, courtier and Whig politician who sat in the English and British House of Commons between 1679 and 1722.

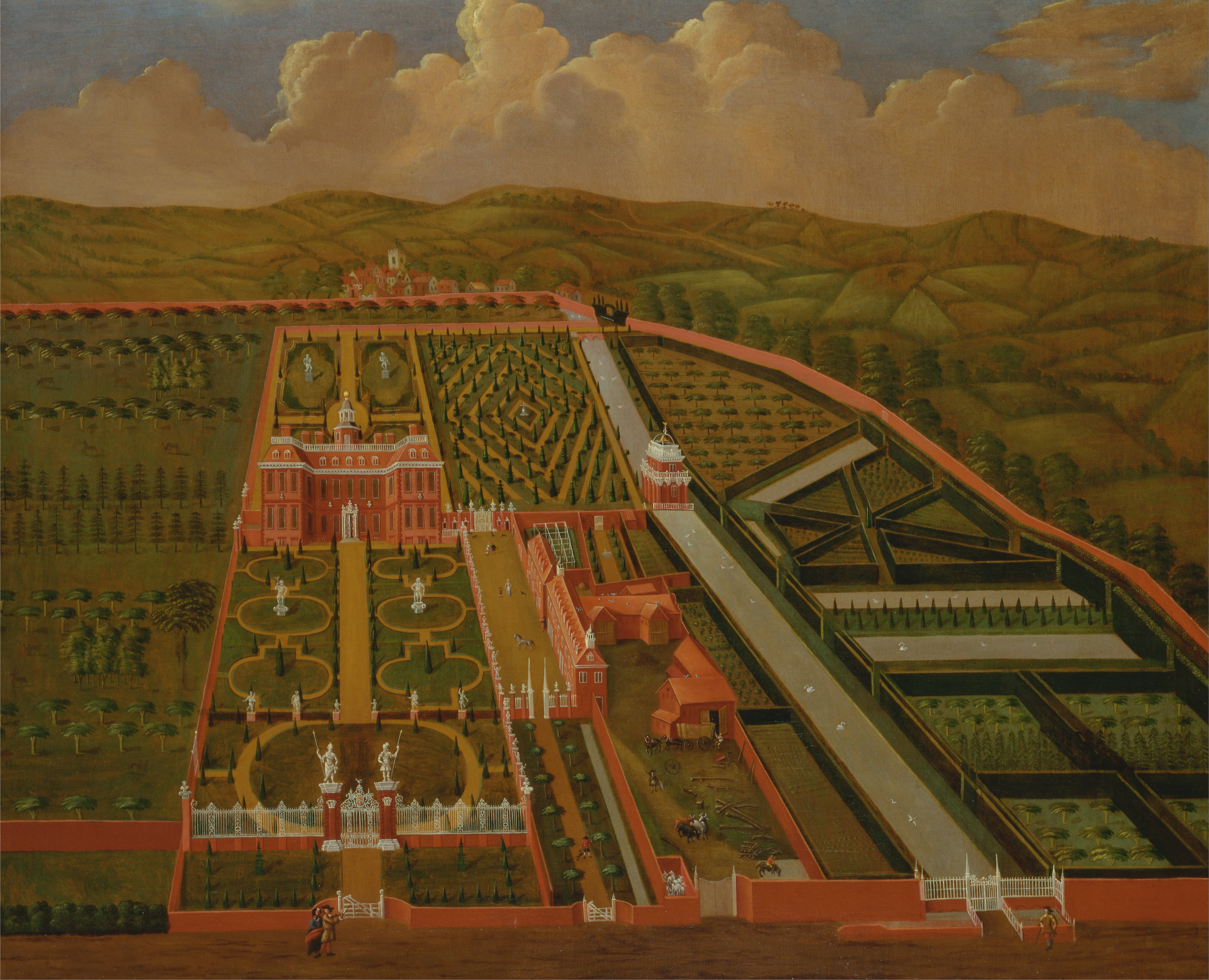
Denham Place, Buckinghamshire (c.1695)

Hill was the eldest surviving son of Roger Hill of Poundisford Park, Somerset and his second wife Abigail Gurdon, daughter of Brampton Gurdon of Assington, Suffolk. He was admitted at Jesus College, Cambridge on 8 June 1658 and admitted at the Inner Temple in 1657, where he was called to the bar in 1666. He was planning to follow his father into the legal profession, but his father died in 1667, and he succeeded to the Poundisfoot estate.

In 1667, he married Abigail Lockey, the daughter of John Lockey of Holmshill, Hertfordshire, He was knighted in July 1668. He was appointed a Gentleman of the privy chamber in 1668, a position he held until 1685. In 1670, he bought the manor of Denham from the Bowyers and rebuilt the house there between 1688 and 1701. He sold Poundisfoot to Simon Welman, a retired physician. He was selected High Sheriff of Buckinghamshire for the year 1672 to 1673.

Hill was elected to Parliament as the member for Amersham from 1679 to 1681. He was returned as MP for Wendover at the 1702 English general election, but was unseated on petition. He was returned again at the 1705 English general election and sat until 1722.

Hill died on 29 December 1729, aged 87, and was buried at Denham church. He left two sons and two daughters. Denham Place passed to his eldest son, Roger, who died shortly after his father.

Parliament of England
Preceded by William Drake; Thomas Proby	Member of Parliament for Amersham; 1679–1681; With: William Drake	Succeeded by William Drake; Hon. William Cheyne
Preceded by Richard Hampden; Richard Crawley	Member of Parliament for Wendover; 1702; With: Richard Hampden	Succeeded by Richard Hampden; Richard Crawley
Parliament of Great Britain
Preceded by Richard Hampden; Richard Crawley	Member of Parliament for Wendover; 1705–1722; With: Richard Hampden 1705–08; Thomas Ellys (1708–09); Henry Grey (1709–13); Richard Hampden (1713–14); James Stanhope (1714–15); Richard Grenville (1715–22)	Succeeded by Richard Hampden; Sir Richard Steele
