= James Metcalfe (Bedford MP) =

James Metcalfe (died 1730) of Roxton, Bedfordshire was a British Tory politician who sat in the House of Commons from 1728 to 1730.

Metcalfe's parentage has not been ascertained. He acquired his property at Roxton, Bedfordshire after 1715.

At the 1727 British general election Metcalfe stood on the Tory interest for Parliament at Bedford. He was defeated in the poll, but on petition, by a compromise, he was declared duly elected on 16 April 1728. Though a Tory, he supported the Administration in Parliament, and voted with them on the civil list arrears in April 1729, and on the Hessians in February 1730.

Matcalfe was taken seriously ill by 26 November 1730 and was buried on 4 December 1730 at Roxton. He left one surviving daughter Sarah, who married John Affleck of Dalham, MP.

Parliament of Great Britain
Preceded by John Orlebar; John Thurlow Brace	Member of Parliament for Bedford; 1728–1730; With: John Orlebar	Succeeded by John Orlebar; Sir Jeremy Vanacker Sambrooke, Bt
