= Denham Place, Buckinghamshire =

Coordinates: 51°34′25″N 0°30′06″W

Denham Place
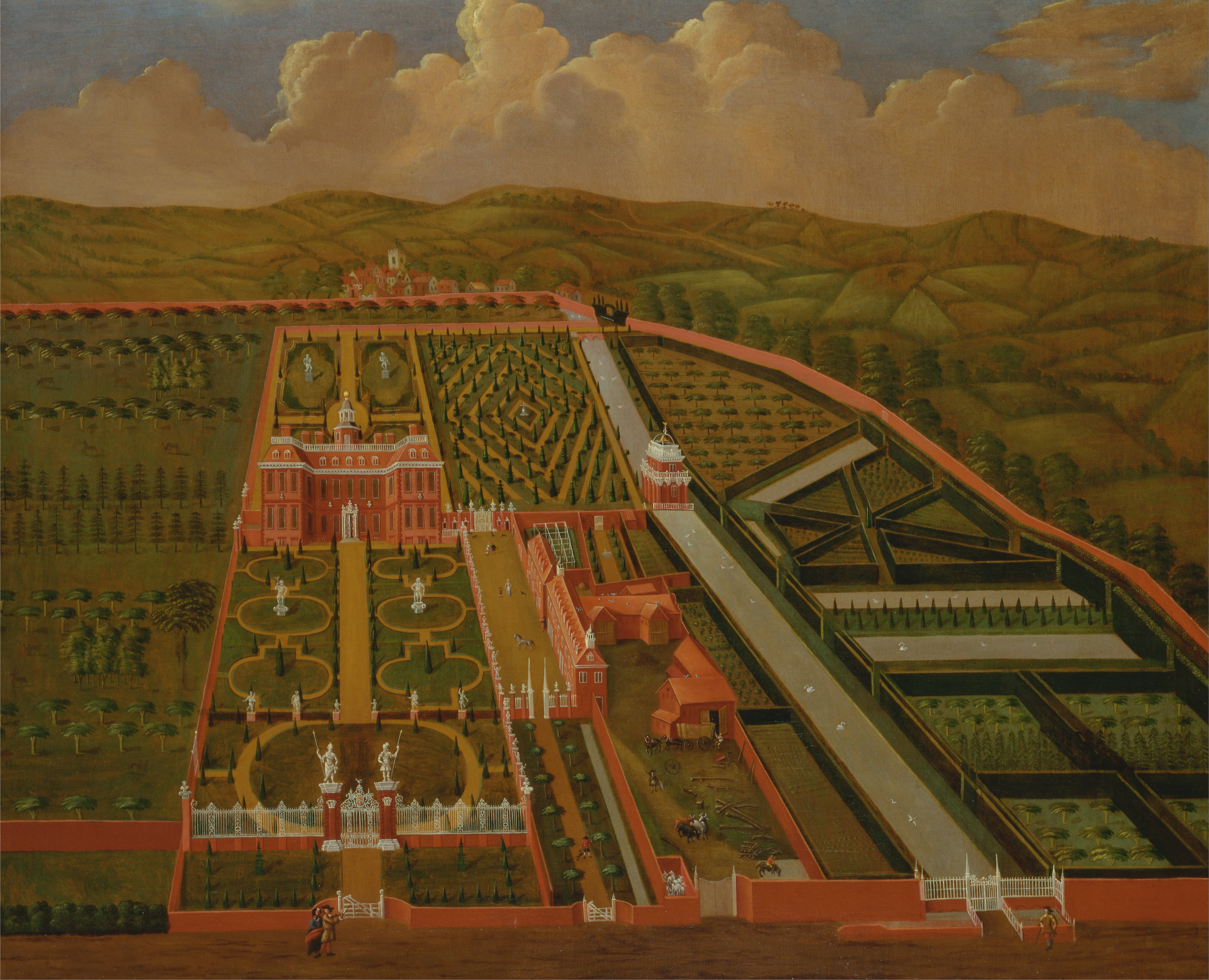
- Denham Place around 1695

General information
- Type: Country house
- Architectural style: Carolean
- Year built: 1688–1701
- Client: Sir Roger Hill
- Owner: Jatania family

Design and construction
- Architect: Capability Brown (landscape park)

Denham Place is a Grade I listed 17th-century country house in Denham, Buckinghamshire. Surrounded by a Grade II listed 18th-century landscaped park, the estate borders the Buckinghamshire Golf Club.

== History ==
=== Origins ===
The house was constructed in 1688–1701 in the Dutch style for Sir Roger Hill, a staunch Protestant and supporter of the Glorious Revolution of 1688. The architect was probably William Stanton. It was surrounded on three sides by elaborate formal gardens inspired by Versailles, which contained a canal and at least sixty five sculptures.

In 1773, most of the formal gardens were removed and replaced with a landscaped parkland designed by Lancelot Capability Brown, the whole enclosed by a 10 ft wall and encompassing a meadow, orchard, ornamental trees, formal sunken garden, flowerbeds, walled garden and a lake.

=== Owners and visitors ===
Notable residents have included members of the Bonaparte family, the American banker J. P. Morgan, the politician and movie financier Robert Vansittart, 1st Baron Vansittart and the producer Harry Saltzman. Saltzman co-produced the first nine James Bond films at nearby Pinewood Studios, and later owners claimed the filmmaker used the house's library as M's office in the films Live and Let Die and The Man with the Golden Gun.

Notable visitors to the estate have included producer Albert Broccoli, Sean Connery, Roger Moore, Michael Caine, Rudolf Nureyev and Gregory Peck.

=== Recent years ===
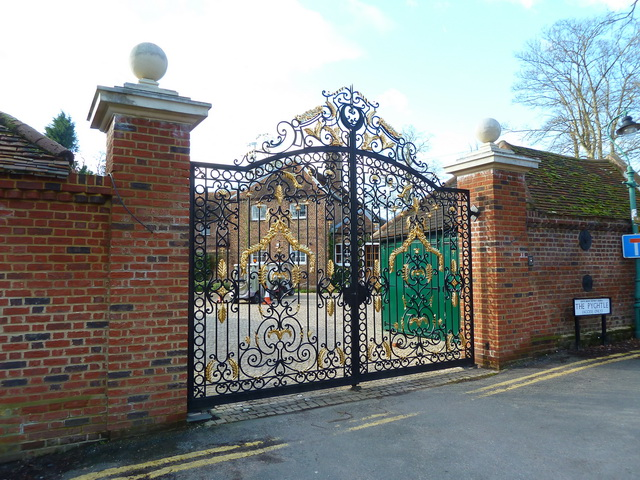
The gates

The property is owned by the Jatania family, which acquired the house from the cigarette manufacturer Rothmans International following the company's acquisition by British American Tobacco in 1999. In 2023, it was listed for sale at £75 million, making it one of the most expensive properties outside of London. Described as “a private palace”, the 28,525 sq ft main house has “state room-style principal entertaining spaces” as well as catering kitchens, a private chapel, two staircases and an elevator. Later being listed for sale at £65 million, it was listed for £45 million as of February 2025.

== See also ==
- Aynhoe Park
- Belton House
- Lainston House
