= Caldecote, Warwickshire =

Village and civil parish in Warwickshire, England

Coordinates: 52.54°N 01.48°W

Caldecote
- Location within Warwickshire
- Population: 171 (2021)
- OS grid reference: SP3594
- District: North Warwickshire
- Shire county: Warwickshire
- Region: West Midlands
- Country: England
- Sovereign state: United Kingdom
- Post town: Nuneaton
- Postcode district: CV10
- Police: Warwickshire
- Fire: Warwickshire
- Ambulance: West Midlands

Caldecote is a village and civil parish in Warwickshire, England, 2 miles north of Nuneaton and south of the A5. An ancient settlement, Caldecote is recorded in the 1086 Domesday Book as being in the ownership of the Bishop of Chester. The parish had a population of 171 in 2021.

== Caldecote Hall ==
The manor house, Caldecote Hall, was the home of Parliamentarian Colonel William Purefoy during the English Civil War and was damaged by Royalist siege by Prince Rupert in 1642. In the 18th century it was owned by Nathan Wright. The Hall was rebuilt in brick in 1880, for Henry Leigh Townshend, who was High Sheriff of Warwickshire in 1901. Townshend lived there until his death in 1924.

In 1924, the Hall was bought by the Church of England Temperance Society, for use as a retreat. In the 1950s, it was the home of St Chad's School but suffered financial problems and a severe fire in 1955. In 2005 it was restored and converted to private flats.

== Gallery ==
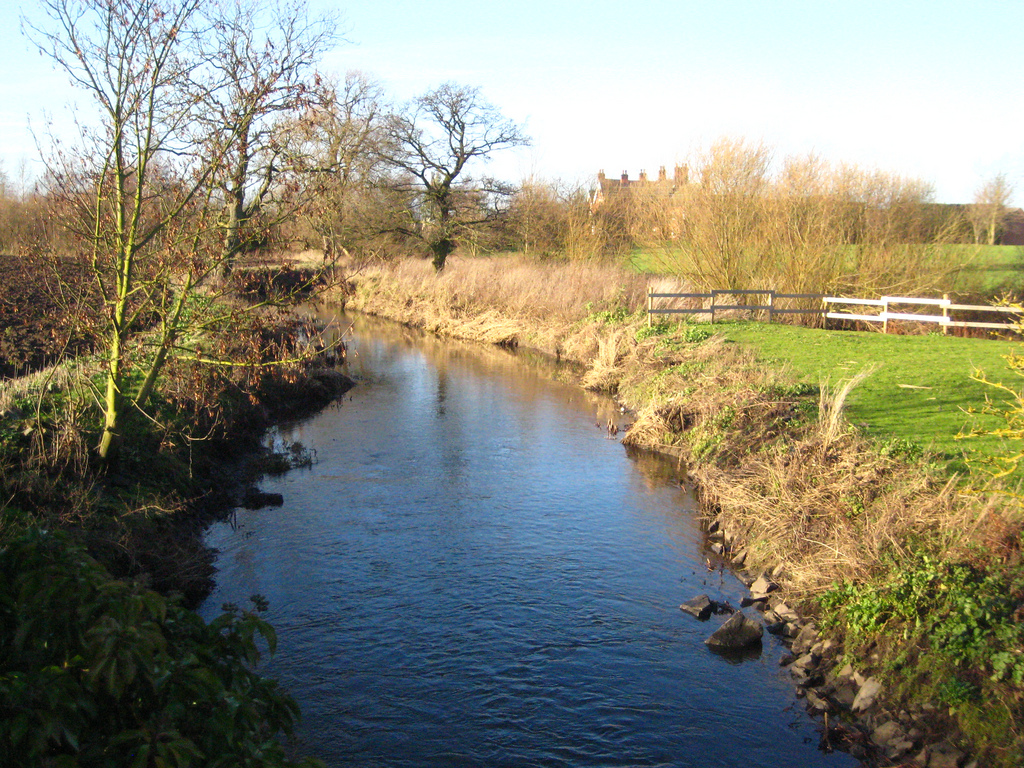
River Anker

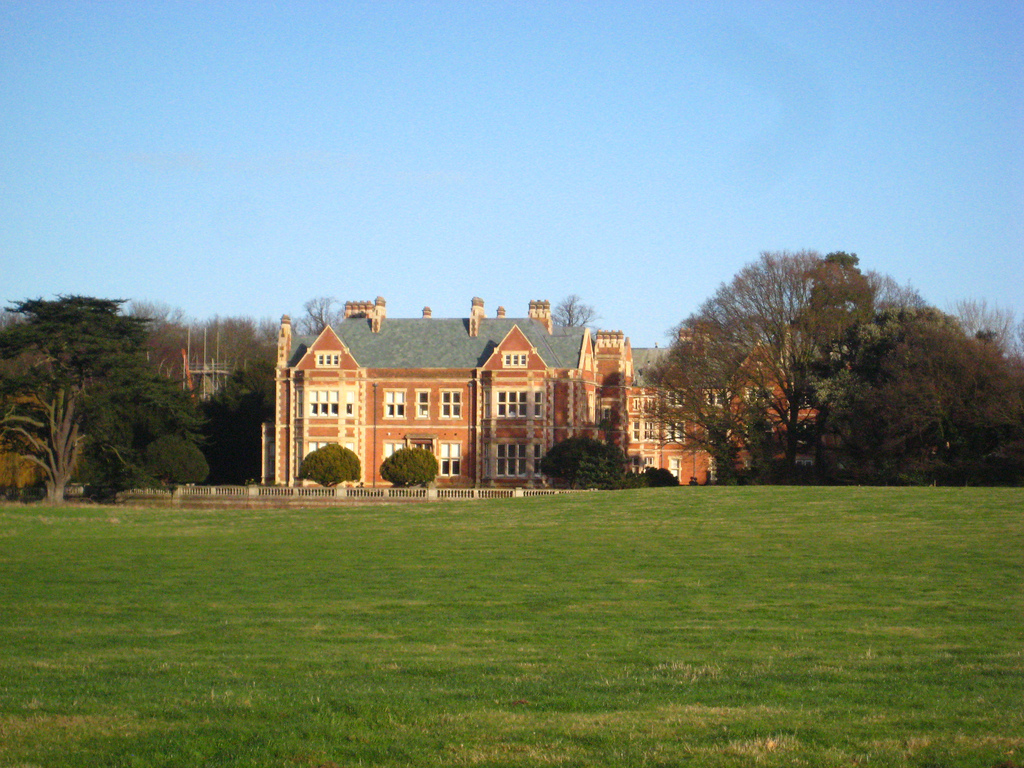
Caldecote Hall

== Sources ==
Sheasby, Alan (1990) Skylark Fields: A Forties Childhood Exeter, Devon: Wheaton Publishers Ltd/Warwickshire Books, ISBN 1-871942-04-7 (Includes a map of Caldecote and surrounding district)
