= Eustace Clare Grenville Murray =

English journalist

- Born: 1824; England
- Died: December 20, 1881; Passy, Paris, France
- Education: Magdalen Hall, Oxford; Inner Temple
- Occupations: Journalist, diplomat, writer
- Notable work: The Roving Englishman (1854) Pictures from the Battlefields (1856); Sport and its Pleasures (1859); The Oyster (1861); The Member for Paris (1871); Men of the Second Empire (1872); Men of the Third Republic (1873) Side Lights on English Society (1881)

Eustace Clare Grenville Murray (1824 – 20 December 1881) was an English journalist.

== Life ==
Murray was the illegitimate son of Richard Grenville, second duke of Buckingham and Chandos. Born in 1824, he matriculated from Magdalen Hall, Oxford, on 1 March 1848, and was entered a student of the Inner Temple in 1850.

=== Diplomat ===
He attracted the notice of Lord Palmerston at an early age, entered the diplomatic service at Palmerston's instigation, and was sent as an attaché to the embassy at Vienna on 14 July 1851. At the same time, Murray entered into an agreement with the Morning Post, by which he undertook to act as Vienna correspondent. Such a contravention of the usages of the foreign office was by an accident brought to the notice of the British ambassador, Lord Westmorland, by whom Murray, though protected against dismissal by the interest of Palmerston, was ostracised from the British chancery.

On 7 April 1852, he was temporarily transferred to Hanover, and on 19 October 1852, he was appointed fifth paid attaché at Constantinople, where his relations with Sir Stratford Canning were from the first the reverse of cordial, and resulted in his being banished as vice-consul to Mitylene.

In 1854, his "Roving Englishman", a series of chapters on travel, appeared, in which the Turkish ambassador was satirised as "Sir Hector Stubble".

Palmerston was unwilling to recall Murray, but in 1855 he was transferred to Odessa as consul-general.

=== Writer ===
He returned to England, after thirteen years of discord with the British residents in Odessa, in 1868, and contributed to the first numbers of Vanity Fair. In the following year he started a weekly journal of the most mordant type, entitled The Queen's Messenger, a prototype of the later "Society papers".

On 22 June 1869, Murray was horsewhipped by Lord Carrington at the door of the Conservative Club in St. James's Street, for a slander upon his father, Robert Carrington, 2nd Baron Carrington. The assault was made under strong provocation. Lord Carrington was prosecuted by Murray, and was found guilty at the Middlesex sessions on 22 July, but was only ordered to appear for judgment when called upon. Meanwhile, on 17 July, Murray had been charged at Bow Street with perjury in denying the authorship of the article in dispute. He was remanded on bail until the 29th, but before that date he withdrew to Paris, and practically exiled himself from Britain.

He became well known in the French capital as the "Comte de Rethel d'Aragon", taking the title of the Spanish lady whom he had married. He produced several novels, but was more at home in short satirical pieces, and wrote innumerable essays and sketches, caustic in matter and incisive in style, for the English and American press. He was Paris correspondent of the Daily News and the Pall Mall Gazette, was one of the early writers in the Cornhill Magazine and in the World, of which he was for a short time joint proprietor, and contributed character sketches to the Illustrated London News, and Queer Stories to Truth. He was certainly one of the most accomplished journalists of his day. He probably did more than any single person to initiate the modern type of journal, which is characterised by a tone of candour with regard to public affairs, but owes its chief attraction to the circulation of private gossip, largely by means of hint and innuendo.

He died at Passy on 20 December, and was buried in Paris on 24 December 1881.

== Works ==
Murray's chief works were:

- Droits et Devoirs des Envoyes Diplomatiques, London, 1853, 12mo: the nucleus of Embassies and Foreign Courts, published two years later.
- The Roving Englishman (reprinted from 'Household Words'), 1854, 8vo.
- Pictures from the Battlefields, 1856, 8vo, a propos of the Crimean campaigns.
- Sport and its Pleasures, 1859, 8vo.
- The Oyster: where, how, and when to find, breed, cook, and eat it, 1861, London, 12mo.
- The Member for Paris: a Tale of the Second Empire, 1871, 8vo (French translation, 1876).
- Men of the Second Empire, 1872, 8vo.
- Men of the Third Republic, 1873, 8vo (two French editions).
- Young Brown; or the Law of Inheritance, 1874, 8vo. This first appeared in the 'Cornhill Magazine,' and is partly autobiographical (French translation, 1875).
- The Boudoir Cabal, 1875, 8vo (French translation, 1876).
- Turkey: being Sketches from Life, 1877, 8vo.
- The Russians of To-day, 1878, 8vo (French translation, 1878).
- Round about France, 1878, 8vo: a series of interesting papers which originally appeared in the 'Daily News.'
- Lucullus, or Palatable Essays, 1878, 8vo.
- Side Lights on English Society; or Sketches from Life, Social and Satirical, 1881, 2 vols. 8vo: a series of gross satires upon social and political personages in England, with an ironical dedication to the queen; illustrated by Frank Barnard.
- High Life in France under the Republic (posthumous), 1884, 8vo.
- Under the Lens: Social Photographs, 1885, 2 vols. 8vo, containing some sketches reprinted from the 'Pall Mall Gazette' in a vein somewhat resembling that of the 'Snob Papers.'
