= Cape (disambiguation) =

A cape is a sleeveless outer garment, which drapes the wearer's back and fastens at the neck.

Cape, the Cape, or CAPE may also refer to:

== Places ==
- Cape (geography), a headland or a promontory of large size extending into a body of water
- Cape Canaveral, Florida, United States
- Cape Cod, Massachusetts, United States
- Cape Girardeau, Missouri, United States
- Cape Horn, Chile
- Cape of Good Hope, a headland on the southwest coast of South Africa, when referred to as the Cape, a metonym for:
  - Dutch Cape Colony, a Dutch colony in southern Africa (1652−1795 & 1803−1806)
  - Cape Colony, a British colony in southern Africa (1795−1802 & 1806−1910)
  - Cape Province, a former province of South Africa formed from the Cape Colony (1910−1996)
- Kanyakumari railway station (station code: CAPE), Tamil Nadu, India

== People ==
- Cape (surname)

== Arts, entertainment, and media ==
- The Cape (1996 TV series)
- The Cape (2011 TV series)
- "The Cape", a short story and comic book series by Joe Hill

== Brands and enterprises ==
- Cape (software company), an American developer of drone software
- Cape Air, an American airline
- Cape plc, a British energy services company, founded as Cape Asbestos Company

== Acronym ==
- Caffeic acid phenethyl ester, a derivative of caffeic acid
- Canadian Association of Physicians for the Environment
- Canadian Association of Professional Employees, a trade union
- Career and Professional Education, a type of school academy in Florida
- Caribbean Advanced Proficiency Examination, an advanced level exams taken in CARICOM countries
- Center for the Army Profession and Ethic, a US Army organization dealing with ethical training
- Coalition of Asian Pacifics in Entertainment, an advocacy organization in the United States
- Community Action for Preventing Extremism, anti-far-right extremism program in New South Wales, Australia
- Computer-aided production engineering, a relatively new and significant branch of engineering
- Convective available potential energy, an indicator of atmospheric instability used in meteorology
- Cyclically adjusted price-to-earnings ratio, a stock market valuation measure
- Director of Cost Assessment and Program Evaluation, an office within the Office of the Secretary of Defense at the Pentagon

== Other uses ==
- Cape (dog), an identifying item worn by a working dog
- Cape (telecommunications company), an American mobile virtual network operator company
- Cape (writ), an old legal writ related to a plea of lands and tenements
- Cape class (disambiguation), various ship classes
- Cape gun, a combination gun
- Cape Independence Party (or CAPE), a small South African political party

== See also ==
- Cape Horn (disambiguation)
- Cape Island (disambiguation)
- Capes (disambiguation)
- Cope (disambiguation)
