= Capes (disambiguation) =

Capes are sleeveless outer garments.

Capes or CAPES may also refer to:

== People ==
- Adrian Capes (1873–1955), English footballer
- Arthur Capes (1875–1945), English footballer
- Bernard Capes (1854–1918), English author
- Geoff Capes (born 1949), British strongman and shot putter
- Jack Capes (1898–1933), English hockey player and cricketer
- Peter Capes (born 1962), Australian businessman and former cricketer

== CAPES ==
- Certificat d'aptitude au professorat de l'enseignement du second degré, a diploma in France
- Coordenadoria de Aperfeiçoamento de Pessoal de Nível Superior, a major research funding agency in Brazil

== Other uses ==
- Capes (role-playing game), a pen-and-paper role-playing game
- Capes Lake, British Columbia, Canada

== See also ==
- Cape (disambiguation)
- The Capes (disambiguation)
- Kapes, 9th century BC wife of Pharaoh Takelot I
- Kapes (reptile), an extinct genus of parareptiles
