= O Poder do Rosário =

- Directed by: Tiago Benetti
- Written by: Tiago Benetti; Felipe Mariano
- Starring: Myrian Rios; Alexandre Machafer; Bárbara Marinho; Bella Maria Benetti; Tarcizio Rafael
- Production companies: Stone Entertainment; Kolbe Arte
- Distributed by: Kolbe Arte
- Release date: 21 May 2026
- Running time: 106 minutes
- Country: Brazil
- Language: Portuguese

O Poder do Rosário is a 2026 Brazilian family drama film written and directed by Tiago Benetti. The film centers on a photographer who has drifted away from his Catholic faith and finds himself confronted with an accident involving a devout girl and her mother. The film's plot was inspired by accounts of miracles attributed to the prayer of the Rosary.

== Plot ==
Helena is a young girl who cultivates a close relationship with God and Virgin Mary, and carries a deep longing to meet her absent father. When she and her mother, Sandra, are involved in a serious accident, André, a photographer who leads a non-religious life, becomes her guardian angel and establishes a connection with Isabel, a devoted nurse. The plot deepens when Helena requires a transplant, prompting André to launch a major social media campaign. A miracle unfolds when thousands of people join in praying the Rosary for her healing.

== Cast ==
- Alexandre Machafer as André
- Bella Maria Benetti as Helena
- Myrian Rios as Conceição
- Bárbara Marinho as Sandra
- Tarcizio Rafael as Roberto
- Frei Gilson
- Padre Fábio Galdino
- Instituto Hesed

== Reception ==
Bruno Simioni Cunha, from the website Não Parece Mas É Sério, stated that "O Poder do Rosário bets on a simple, emotional, and deeply spiritual structure" and that, "even though it is predictable at times, the film finds strength in the sincerity with which it conveys its message." He observes that the film uses parallel stories to unite characters around "the religious symbolism of the Rosary," transforming it into "a spiritual bond" and "a representation of comfort, hope, and reconciliation." The critic mentions the work's didacticism, with real-life testimonies that "may divide opinions," but praises the humanized performances and the visual direction focused on "the emotional proximity of the characters." Finally, he concludes that the film, while not reinventing the genre, builds "a humane, sensitive, and emotionally sincere story."
