= The Capes =

The Capes may refer to:

- Virginia Capes, at the entrance to Chesapeake Bay
- The Capes (band), early 21st century London band
- The Capes region, a surfing location in South West Western Australia

== See also ==
- Battle of the Capes
- Cape (disambiguation)
- Capes (disambiguation)
