= Kape =

Kape or KAPE may refer to:

- KAPE, a radio station (1550 AM) in Cape Girardeau, Missouri, United States
- Kape Alamid, coffee made from berries which have passed through the digestive tract of the Asian Palm Civet
- Kape Barako, a coffee grown in the Philippines
- Kape Technologies, a computer security company

== See also ==
- Kapes, a Queen consort of Egypt, wife of Pharaoh Takelot I
- Kapes (reptile), an extinct genus of parareptile
- Cape (disambiguation)
