= Cape Horn (disambiguation) =

Cape Horn (also Hoorn) is the southernmost headland of South America.

Cape Horn may also refer to:

- Cape Horn Biosphere Reserve, located in the extreme south of Chile
- Cape Horn (Washington), a mountain in Washington state
- Cape Horn Interchange, a major freeway intersection on the Trans-Canada Highway
- Cape Horn, Mendocino County, California
- Cape Horn, Placer County, California

== See also ==
- Cabo de Hornos, Chile, a Chilean commune
- Cabo de Hornos National Park, also located in the extreme south of Chile
- Cabo de Hornos (ship), an oceanographic research ship operated by the Chilean Navy
- False Cape Horn, the southernmost point of the large islands of the Tierra del Fuego group
- Cape Horner, a captain of a sailing ship which has sailed around Cape Horn
- Cape Froward, the southernmost point on the mainland of the American continent
- Diego Ramírez Islands, the southernmost point of the American continent (including islands)
