= Universities and higher education in Brazil =

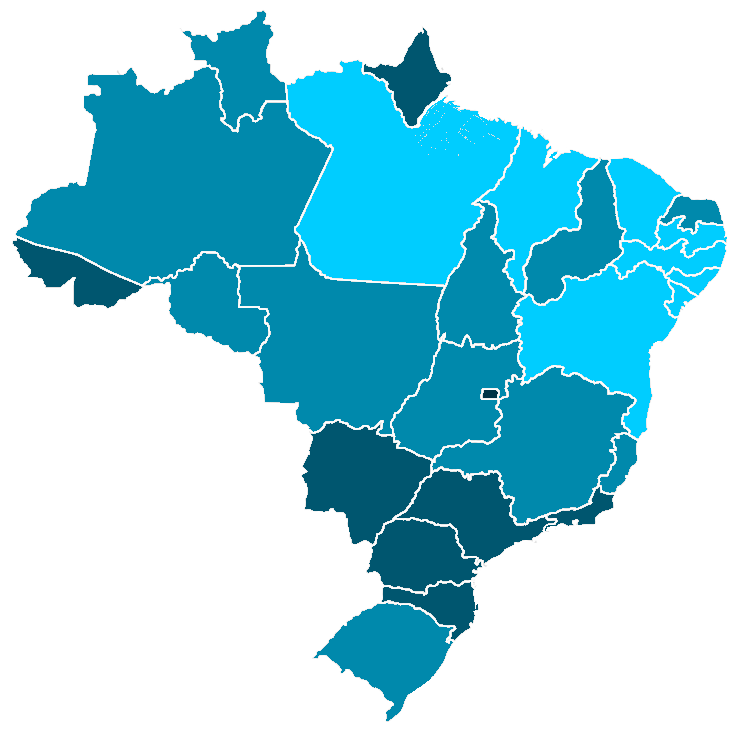
Percentage of the Brazilian population holding a university degree in 2022 by state, according to IBGE's PNAD-C/A. > 25% 20% – 25% 15% – 20% 10% – 15% < 10%

Brazil adopts a mixed system of public and privately funded universities. Public universities can be federally funded or financed by State governments (such as USP, Unicamp and Unesp in the State of São Paulo). Private schools can be for-profit or, in the case of Catholic universities, not-for-profit.

== History ==
The Portuguese reserved the status of "university" to the University of Coimbra and so, never created schools with that designation in Brazil. Nevertheless, they created several higher and secondary learning schools which provided a level of education comparable or even above that of the institutions denominated "universities" established in some of the neighboring Spanish American colonies as early as the 17th century. Examples were the most important Jesuit colleges in Portuguese colonial Brazil, particularly those located in the cities of Salvador and Rio de Janeiro, which - despite not being designated "universities" - offered liberal arts courses in Latin, Greek, philosophy and theology (likewise the Spanish American universities). Upon graduating, students had the option of either becoming priests or continuing their studies in Europe, usually at the University of Coimbra in Portugal.

After the expulsion of the Jesuits from Portugal in 1759, other religious orders such as the Benedictines and Carmelites were charged with education in Brazil. At the same time, the Portuguese Crown founded the "aulas-régias" (Royal public schools). In 1792, the Royal Academy of Artillery, Fortification and Drawing was founded in Rio de Janeiro, thereby becoming the first higher learning school of engineering in the Americas.

Following the arrival of King John VI of Portugal and the Transfer of the Portuguese Court to Brazil, other schools of higher learning were founded in Brazil, although continuing to not formally be called "universities". These including those specialized in civil and military engineering such as the Royal Academy of the Midshipmen (1808) and the Royal Military Academy (1810). Two medical schools were also established, these being the medical-chirurgical academies of Salvador (1808) and of Rio de Janeiro (1809). In addition, other technical courses in the fields of botany, chemistry, geology, mineralogy, and economy were created.

Shortly after independence from Portugal in 1822, under the reign of Emperor Peter I of Brazil, faculties of law were founded in São Paulo (1827) and Olinda (1827). Many of those institutions served as nuclei that subsequently developed into modern Brazilian universities, i.e., the Federal University of Bahia, the Federal University of Pernambuco, the Federal University of Ouro Preto, the Federal University of Rio de Janeiro and the University of São Paulo.

Higher Education institutions expanded throughout the twentieth century in Brazil. However, many of the students who had access to Higher Education came from wealthier backgrounds. In 1912, the first Brazilian institution designated "university" is created, this being the University of Paraná.

An important development that affected Brazil's Higher Education landscape transpired after the collapse of the twenty one year Brazilian military government (1964 – 1985) and the re-democratization of the country. As part of Brazil's negotiated transition from authoritarianism to democracy, a new Constitution of Brazil emerged in 1988. It came to be known as the “Citizen Constitution” (Constituição Cidadã), promoting the right to work, the right to a decent wage, the right to social security, and the right to education. Furthermore, the new Constitution of Brazil, allowed public funds to be allocated to private, community, religious, or philanthropic schools for their support on meeting the rights to education. This constitutional doctrine was an important turning point in the growth of Brazil's private Higher Education sector, one that is financed through private investors and public institutions. In support of this educational movement, the federal government established a new policy in 1996 to liberalize the Higher Education sector, known as the Foundations and Guidelines for National Education law (lei 9.394). Under this reformed system, Higher Education institutions could begin functioning as for-profit entities. Private Higher Education institutions had existed since the 1600s, but most were affiliated with the Catholic Church or were non-profit in nature. This new policy paved the way for private enterprises to begin offering Higher Education degrees on a mass scale.

Nowadays, the Brazilian university system reflects world standards, and some of Brazil's universities appear among the 200 best in the world. The University of São Paulo (USP), for example, is considered the best university in Ibero-America. In the 2012 SIR World Report from the SCImago Institutions Rankings, USP was ranked 11th in the world. Other ranking systems show similar results: the 2012 University Ranking by Academic Performance (URAP) ranked USP 28th in the world, and in the Times Higher Education report, "Top Universities by Reputation 2012", ranked USP among the top 70 universities in the world. In the 2012 QS World University Rankings, under Rankings of universities in Brazil, the University of Campinas and the University of Rio de Janeiro were ranked 228 and 333 in the world, respectively.

== Categories ==
Higher education in Brazil is divided into three categories:

- Universities are institutions that conduct research and community outreach, with at least one third of the teaching staff with PhD qualifications.
- University centers are multi-course institutions that are not required to carry out research, but with autonomy to open new courses without seeking permission from the Ministry of Education.
- Integrated Faculties and Schools of Higher Education are smaller institutions with little autonomy and must obtain approval from the Ministry of Education when opening new courses, certificates, or degrees.

In 2009, the federal government was overseeing 94 higher education institutions with centralized control (spanning all three categories); state governments were managing 84 higher education institutions; and municipal governments ran 67 higher education institutions, mainly providing technical courses in integrated faculties (see INEP, 2009). Most federal and state institutions are universities and tuition is free, while municipal governments tend to run smaller institutes, sometimes charging tuition. Private higher education institutions primarily fall within the latter two categories and charge wide-ranging fees, based on the degree programs offered.

== Degrees ==
=== Undergraduate degrees ===
In Brazil, these degrees are known as first degree:

- Bachelor's (bacharelado): varies between 3 and 6 years to complete. Enables individuals to act as professionals in a certain area (e.g., lawyer, economist, physician).
- Licentiate (licenciatura): varies between 3 and 4 years to complete. Enables individuals to act as elementary or secondary school teachers in a certain area (e.g., licensed teacher of Math, English, Biology, etc.).
- Technologist (tecnólogo): varies between 2 and 3 years of full-time studies to complete. This degree takes a shorter time period to obtain, with specific professional courses aimed at providing highly specialized knowledge (e.g., agribusiness technical degree, tourism management degree, etc.).

Degree programs in public universities are totally financed by the government. In private higher education institutions, however, the course fees and degree programs vary in price significantly. Although lower cost courses are available, fees for some degree avenues are very expensive.

=== Graduate degrees ===
In Brazil, these degrees are known as second degree (pós-graduação):

- "Lato sensu postgraduate" degree: this degree represents a specialization in a certain area, and takes approximately 1 to 2 years to complete. A lato sensu degree is not a door opener for the later pursuit of a doctoral degree. If one is interested in a PhD, a stricto sensu master's degree should be taken instead. MBA programs in Brazil are classified as lato sensu programs.

- "Stricto sensu postgraduate" degree: this degree enables one to pursue an academic career. In chronological order:

- Master's degree (mestrado): this takes 1 to 2 years of full time studies to complete. Often, a Master’s degree serves as an additional qualification for those in the job market, or for those who want to pursue a PhD. A stricto sensu master's degree in management is the equivalent of a full time MBA in North America.
- Doctoral degree / PhD (doutorado): this takes 3 to 4 years to complete, and is usually used as a step-stone for an academic life.
- Postdoctoral research (pós-doutorado): this is not an academic title; it usually denotes excellency in a field of knowledge acquired through supervised research after a doctorate.

== Equivalence ==
There is no unified academic credit system in Brazil. The regulating bodies of the Ministry of Education and associated legislation counts the hours of instruction. A full-time year of higher education usually takes between 800 and 1,200 contact hours in Brazil, which would be equivalent to 50-80 US credits.

=== Europe ===
There is no formal treaty between the Brazilian Ministry of Education and the European Union's Bologna process. The following are rough comparisons:

- the European First Cycle would correspond to the Brazilian undergraduate degrees of bacharelado, licenciatura, and tecnologia. The Brazilian "Bachelor’s degree" takes 3 to 6 years to complete, which usually includes a written monograph or a final project; a European "Bachelor’s degree" can be completed in 3 years, after which many enroll in a 1 or 2-year-long "Master's degree" in the Bologna process. When comparing the former European national systems to the Brazilian system, the Brazilian "Bachelor’s degree" would be equivalent to the old German Diploma, the Italian Laurea, or the French "Magistère", "Mastère" or "Diplôme des Grandes Ecoles".
- the Second Cycle in the Bologna process would correspond to the Brazilian master's degree, which usually takes 1 to 2 years to complete and a "lato sensu postgraduate" degree, which requires the minimum of 360 hours of instruction.
- the Third Cycle in the Bologna process would be equivalent to the Brazilian Doctoral degree.

=== United States ===
A Brazilian bachelor's degrees could be compared to a four-year Bachelor of Arts (B.A.) or Bachelor of Science (B.S.) in the United States. Brazilian and U.S. Master's and Doctoral degrees are roughly equivalent. Technology degrees of 3 year of length could be also compared to undergraduate technology courses or with 3 year bachelor's degree, depending on the field of study. Technologist degrees allows the undergraduate to pursue Master's and Doctoral courses.

== Admissions ==
In order to enter a university in Brazil, candidates must undergo a public open examination called Vestibular, which usually lasts between 1 and 5 days and takes place once a year. Some universities may run Vestibular twice a year. Offering more frequent exams is popular among private universities, while public universities usually run the Vestibular only once a year (in November, December, or January). The Vestibular can be compared to the SAT or ACT in the U.S.

Universities offer a limited number of places, and the best qualified candidates are selected for entrance. The vestibular includes many subjects offered in high school such as: Mathematics, Physics, Chemistry, Biology, History, Geography, Literature, Portuguese language, and a foreign language (usually the candidate can choose between English, Spanish or French). Since public universities are free of charge and there are a limited number of open slots, there is high competition with the Vestibular. There are nearly 10 candidates for every place in public universities; in private universities the ratio is less than two-to-one (see INEP, 2000 - 2009).

Most universities in Brazil also admit students according to their high school performance as assessed in the ENEM (Exame Nacional do Ensino Médio). ENEM and the Vestibular co-exist in some universities, whereas in others ENEM has replaced the Vestibular.

== Grading System ==
There is a myriad of grading systems in Brazil. The most popular are:

- Percentage point grading system: ranges from 0% to 100%
- Scale grading system: ranges from 0 to 10 (0 represents the lowest and 10 represents that highest)
- Stage grading system: usually uses letters ranging from A (best) to E (worst)

Below is a summary of the grading systems:

- "A": 90%–100% (Excellent)
- "B": 80%–89% (Very good)
- "C": 70%–79% (Good)
- "D": 60%–69% (Satisfactory)
- "E": < 50% or < 60% (Failing grade)

Usually, the lowest passing grade in Brazil represents a 5 (5 out of 10 / 50% / "E"), but some universities adopt a 7 or 70% as the minimum passing grade. Universities are free to choose their own grading system.

== Exams ==
Exams are conducted by the professors and are decentralized: every professor is responsible for scheduling, applying, and scoring exams. In contrast to other countries, there is no equivalent in Brazil of centralized university departments that are in charge of scheduling and grading exams.

== Public and private universities ==
Public universities usually offer the best quality education, and therefore competition during the Vestibular is fierce. Public universities usually run courses all-day, while private for-profit universities offer a mix of all-day long and night-only courses. The latter is increasingly popular for working adults to complete Higher Education degrees in Brazil. Recently, some public universities have introduced some night-only courses in combination with day-courses. Although public universities offer the best quality education and conduct research, there are continuous complaints from these institutions about being underfunded. Private universities tend to be smaller when compared to public universities, but often have more modern infrastructures and amenities (e.g., buildings and campuses).

The 1996 law "Foundations and Guidelines for National Education" (lei 9.394) opened the doors for many private universities to begin offering degrees on a mass scale. As a result, growth within the private Higher Education sector has provided more opportunities for students country-wide. Between 2000 and 2009, the number of available openings in public universities rose 60 percent. During this same period, the number of available openings in private sector institutions rose 185 percent (see INEP, 2000 and 2009). In 2009, there were 2,069 private Higher Education institutions compared to 1,004 private institutions in 2000 (see INEP, 2000 and 2009). The 15 largest companies in 2009 that ran private universities represented 27 percent of the total market, with yearly profits above 21 percent; and the country's private education sector became the tenth largest sector in the Brazilian economy, accounting for R$25 billion per year.

There are currently more than 2,600 public and private universities distributed throughout Brazil, a number that is growing quickly.

Elizabeth Redden in June 2015 reports that Professor Dante J. Salto has argued in the journal International Higher Education that:

Brazil’s for-profit colleges enroll about a third of all students in higher education. The for-profit sector, which predominantly enrolls students in social science, business, law, education and health care-related fields, absorbs demand that the public higher education system lacks the capacity to meet, and is seen as an important player in helping Brazil move toward its policy goal of dramatically increasing higher education participation rates. The proportion of Brazilian 18- to 24-year-olds enrolled in higher education (the country's net enrollment rate) is only in the teens, while the gross enrollment rate, which takes into account students of all ages, stands at around 30 percent.

== Niches of excellence ==
Brazil presents some niches of excellence in higher education, both public and private. Some of those niches, in spite of being recognized nationwide, are not recognized as universities and often do not appear on official universities rankings.

Some examples include: Instituto Tecnológico de Aeronáutica (ITA), a college sponsored by the Brazilian military, with graduates who are often employed within the Brazilian Aerospace Industry; the Instituto Militar de Engenharia (IME) (the Army's equivalent); both of those institutes belonging to the Engineering/STEM fields, or yet a Management/Economics institute: Fundação Getúlio Vargas (FGV), a foundation/think tank that offers Management and Economics courses. In 2010, Você SA magazine ranked the OneMBA program offered by FGV as the 1st Executive MBA in Brazil (for the third year in a row).

== Skills development ==
Training levies create a means for under-educated members of society to continue to train and build up their human capital. This is relevant for the informal sector, which tends to employ workers with low levels of education. They provide a useful tool in a context of market failure and the underprovision of continuing education.

There are several types of scheme that use payroll taxes to raise resources for funding skills development. They include: revenue-generating schemes, levy-subsidy schemes, and levy-exemption schemes. The type of system used in Brazil is the revenue-generating scheme, which base their funding on a fixed-rate levy per working hour or per employee. The revenue is generally earmarked for regional or sectoral training programmes.

Revenue-generating schemes are reliable in generating funding for training in countries where there is a persistent shortage of funding available to promote skills development. They can also greatly reduce the cost to governments of training provision. For example, in Brazil a major body providing commercial training (Serviço Nacional de Aprendizagem Comercial, SENAC) receives 80% of its revenue through levy-based funds. SENAI (Serviço Nacional de Aprendizagem Industrial), the Brazilian industrial training scheme, has failed to increase participation rates, as has happened for other revenue-generating schemes, probably because it does not offer any incentives to employers to provide additional training.

There are currently five training funds in Brazil, funded via the revenue-generating method, although there are some differences among them. Such training funds include:

- SENAI – the national training scheme;
- SENAC – a training fund which is commerce-specific;
- SENAT – a fund specifically for transport training;
- SEBRAE – a training scheme focused on servicing small businesses;
- SENAR – a training scheme for rural areas.
- SENAI, SENAC and SENAT all impose a 1% payroll levy on all industrial enterprises, while SENAI charges an additional 0.5% for companies with more than 500 employees. SENAR applies a 2.5% tax on the sale of agricultural goods, while SEBRAE imposes a 0.3% levy across all sectors.

== Gallery ==
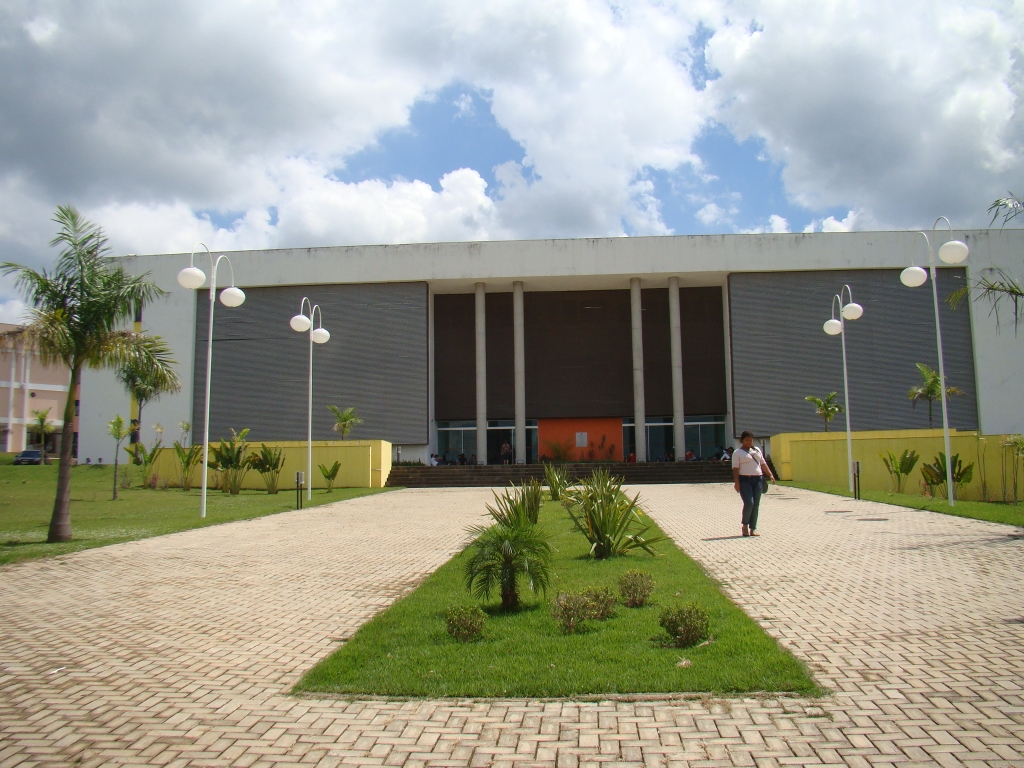
UFSJ

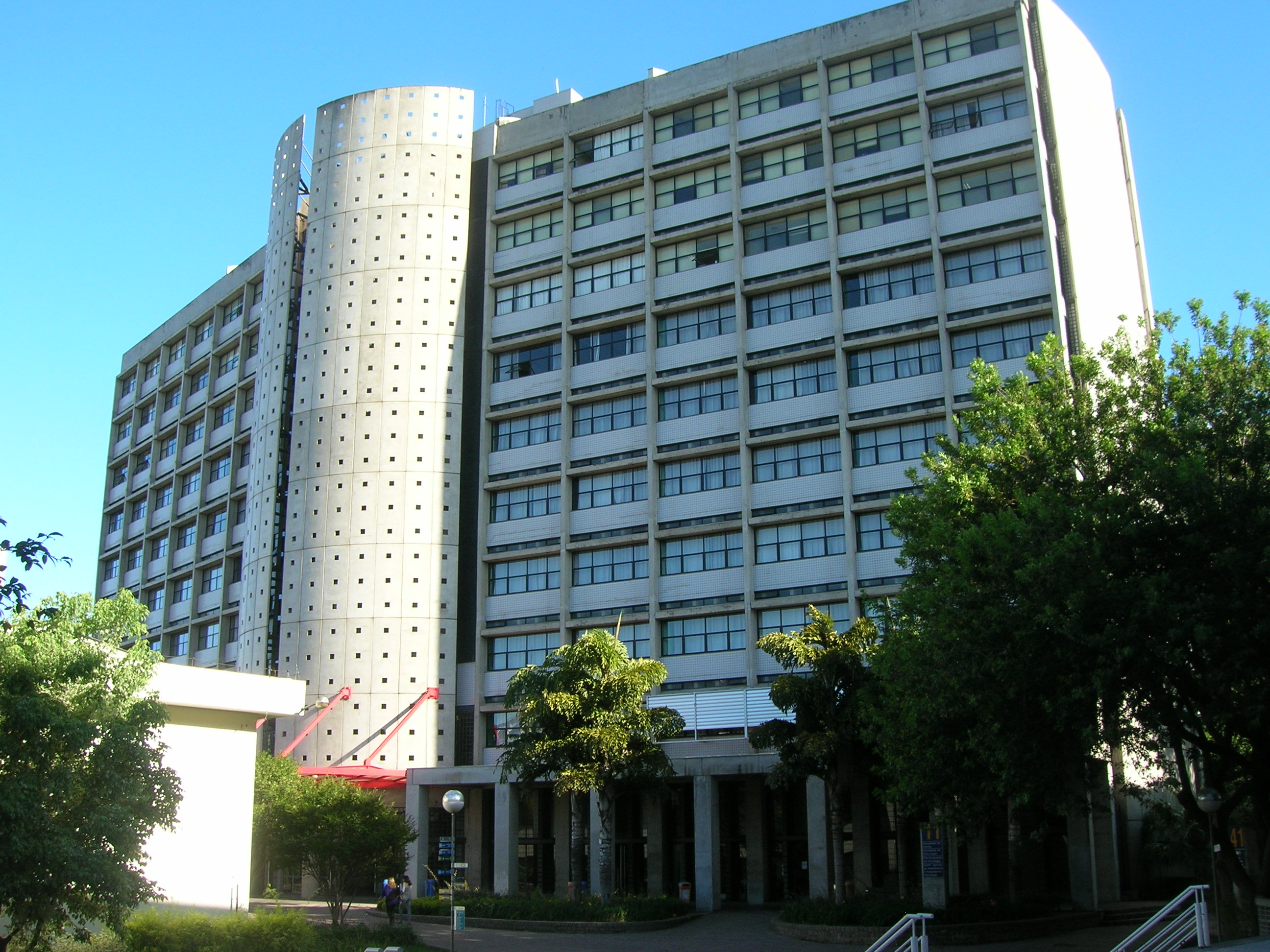
PUCRS

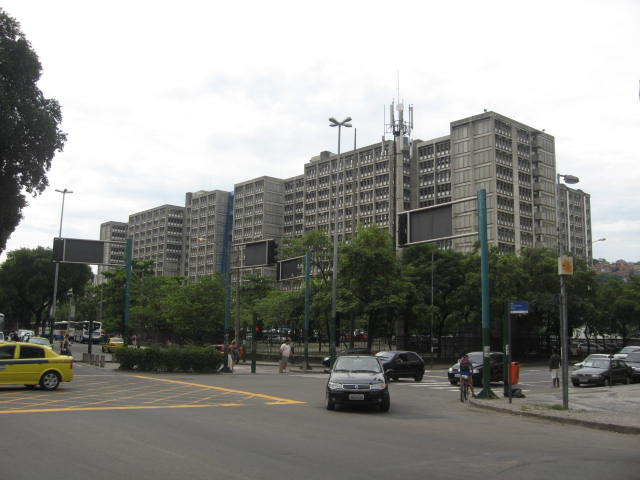
UERJ

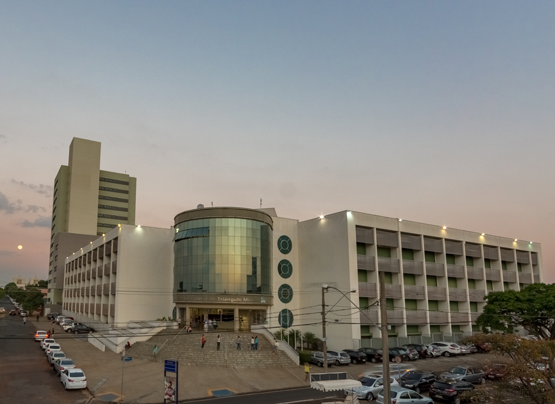
UFTM

UFRGS

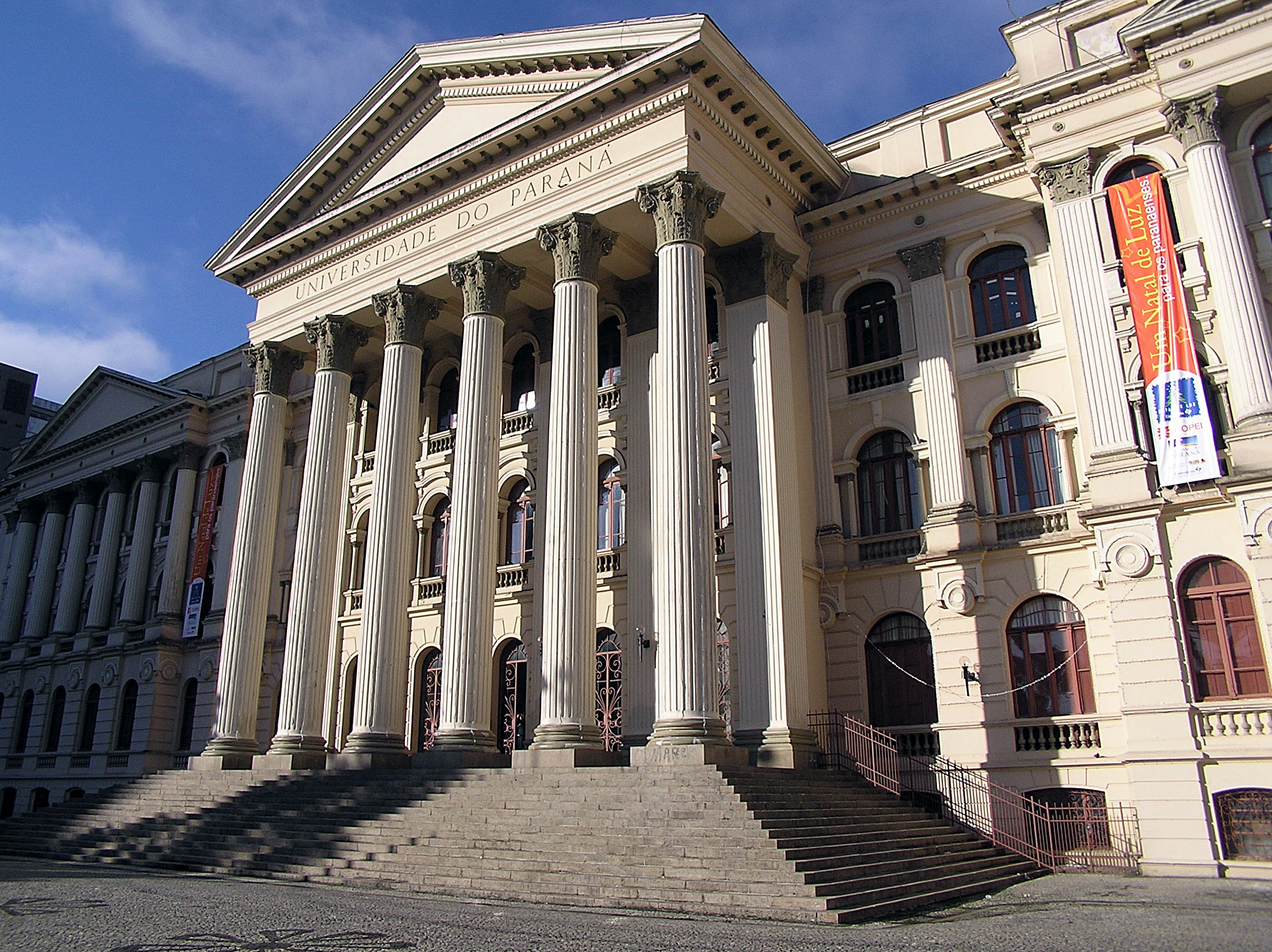
UFPR

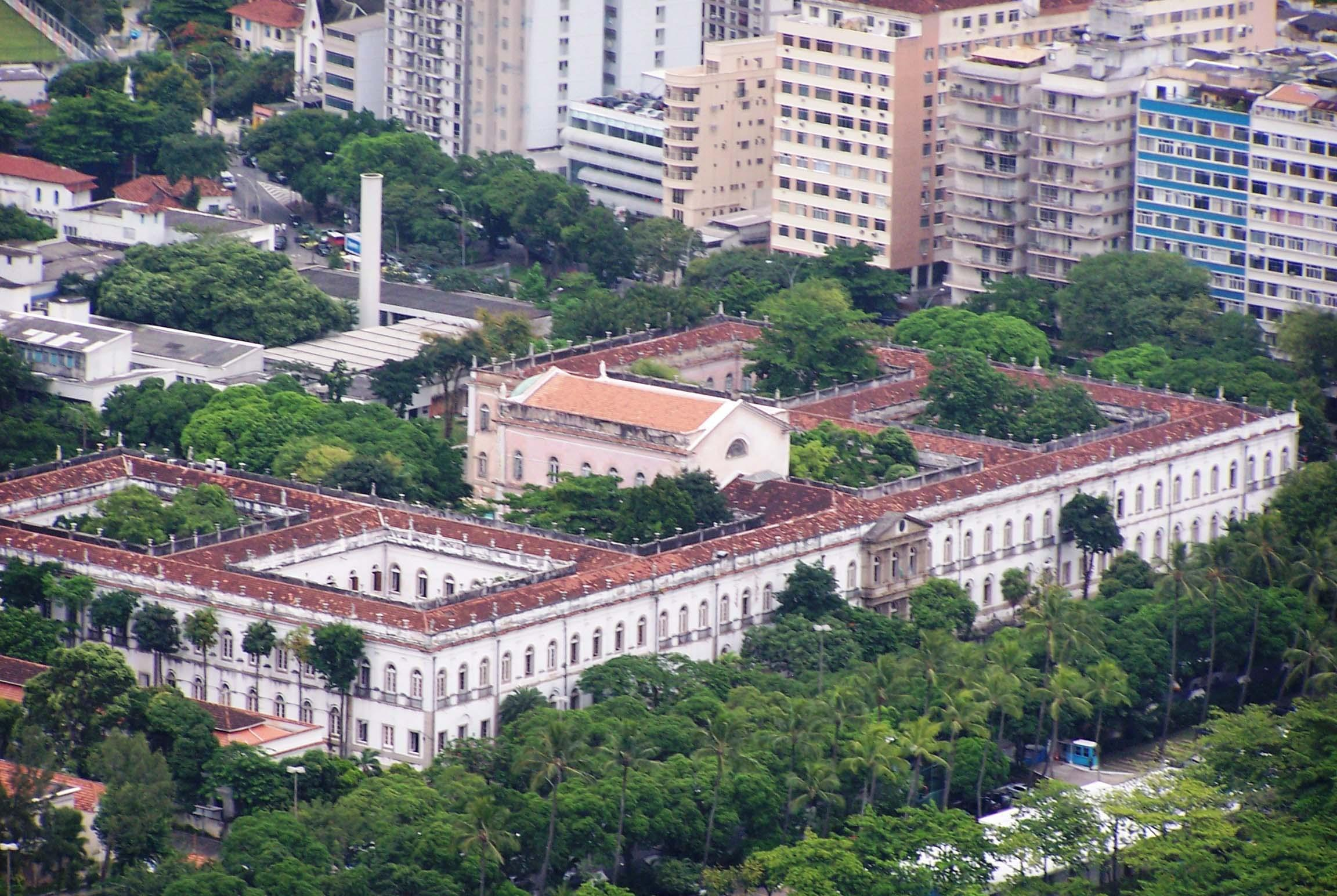
UFRJ

USP

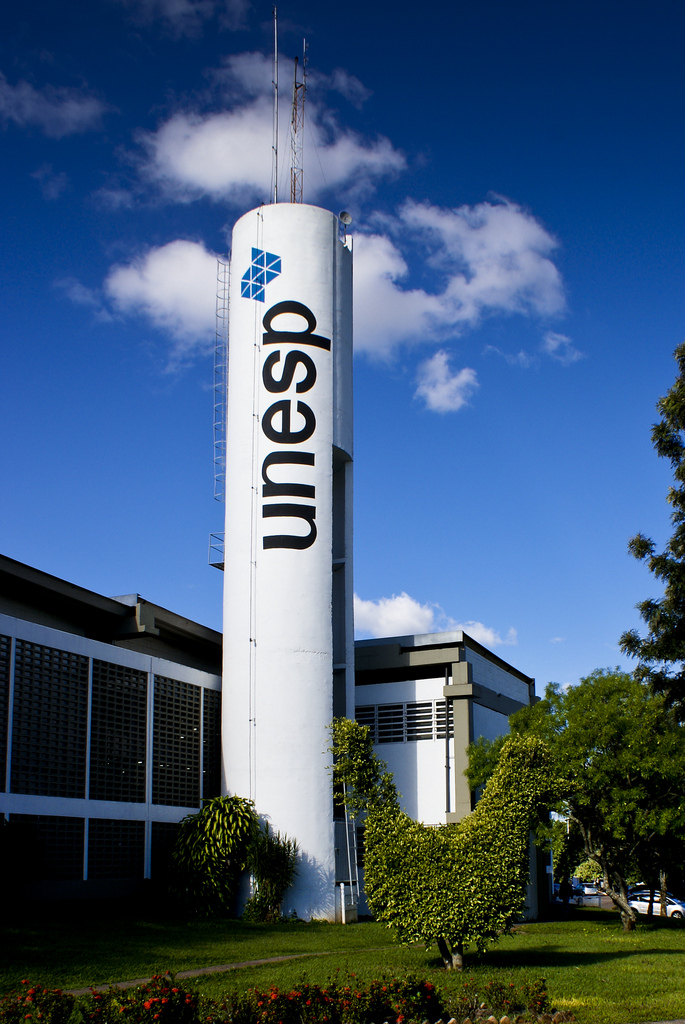
UNESP

Unisinos

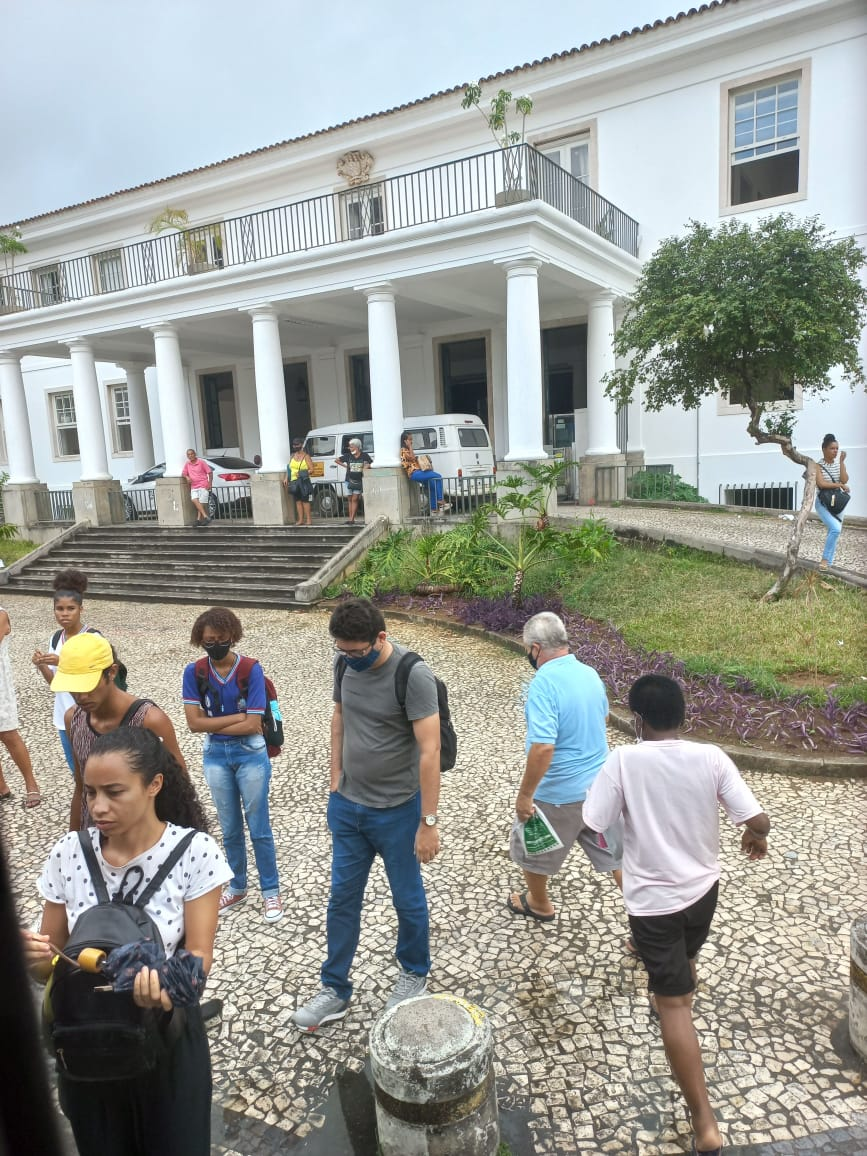
UFBA

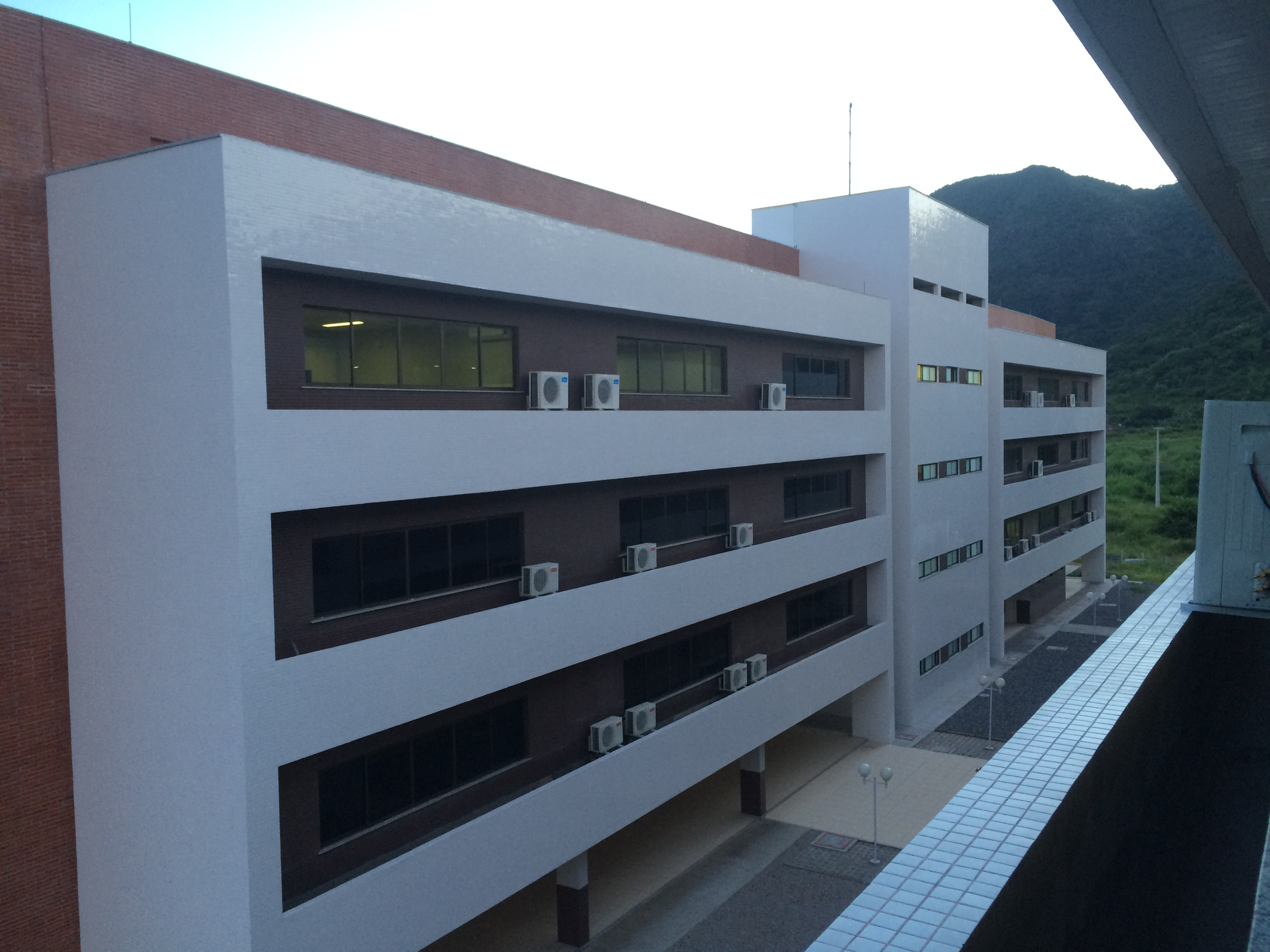
Unilab

Unicamp

UnB

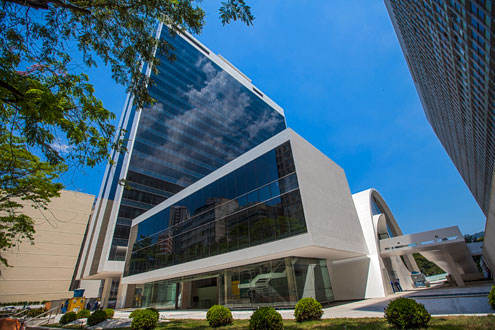
FGV

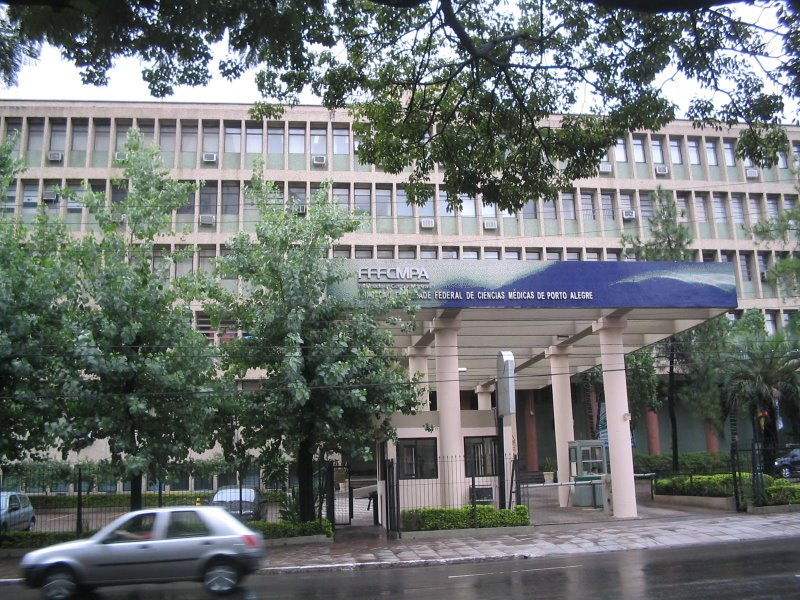
UFCSPA

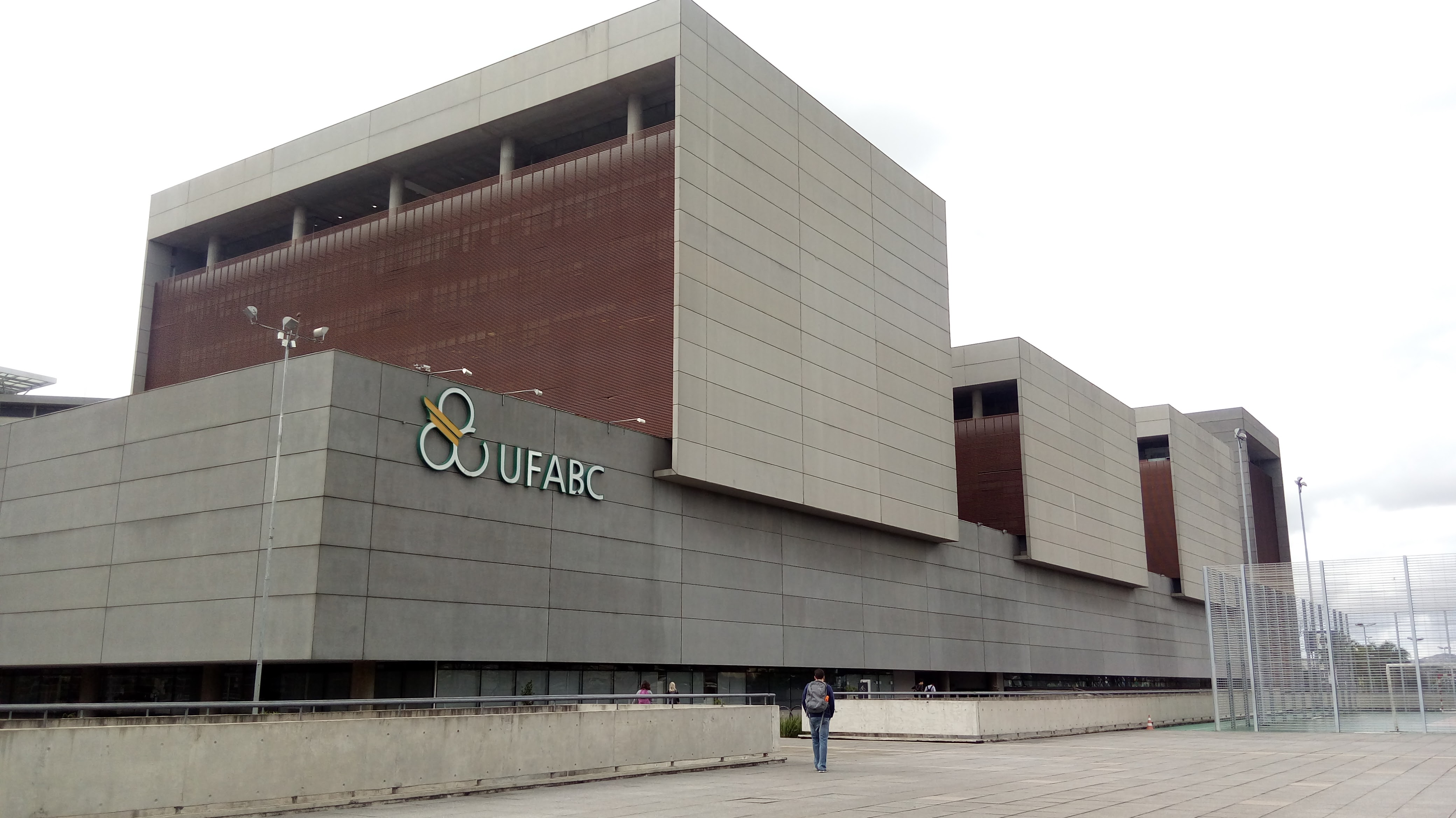
UFABC

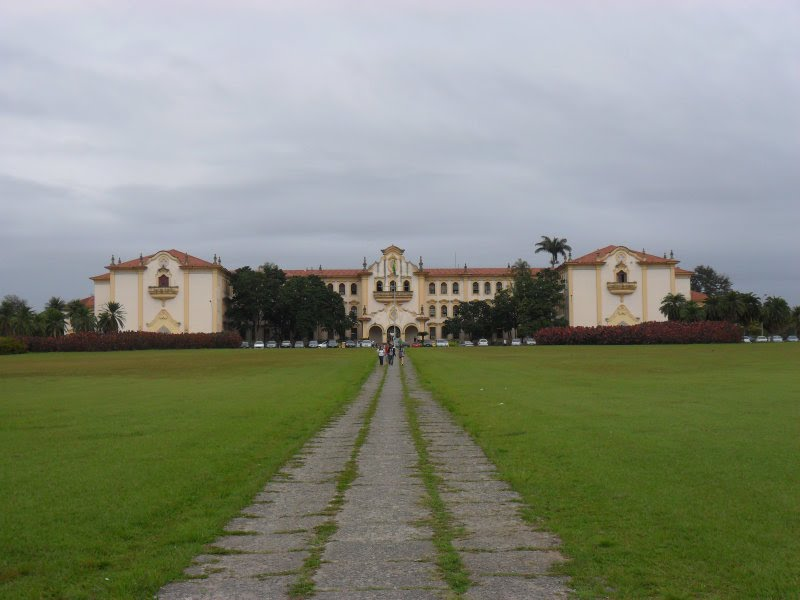
UFRRJ

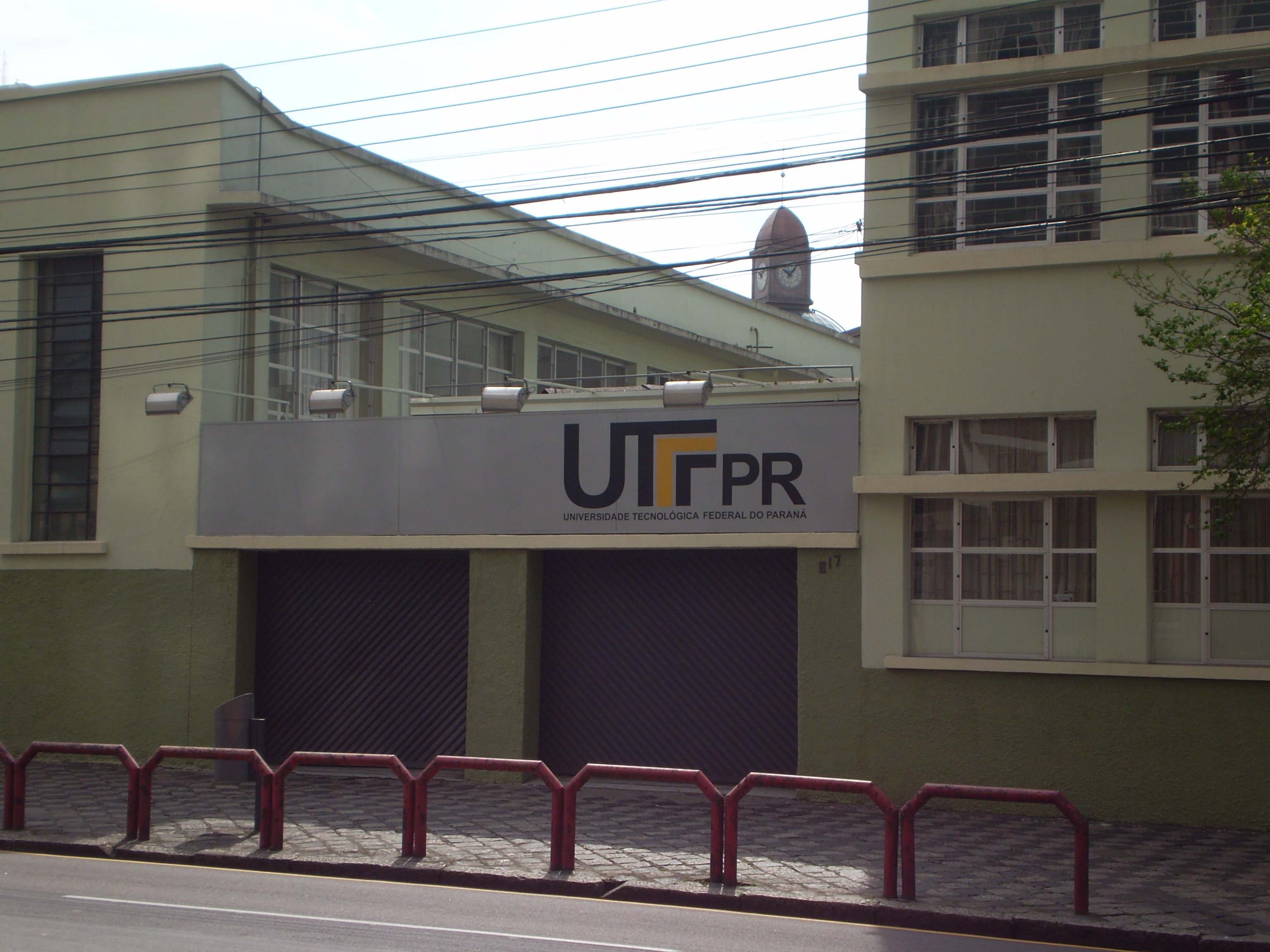
UTFPR

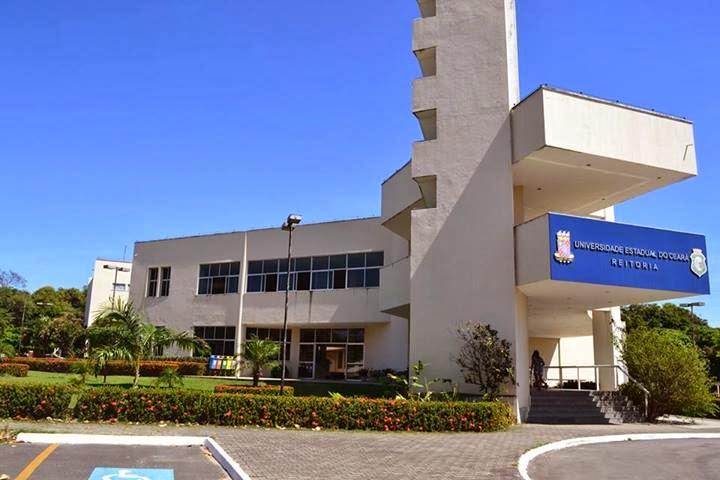
UECE

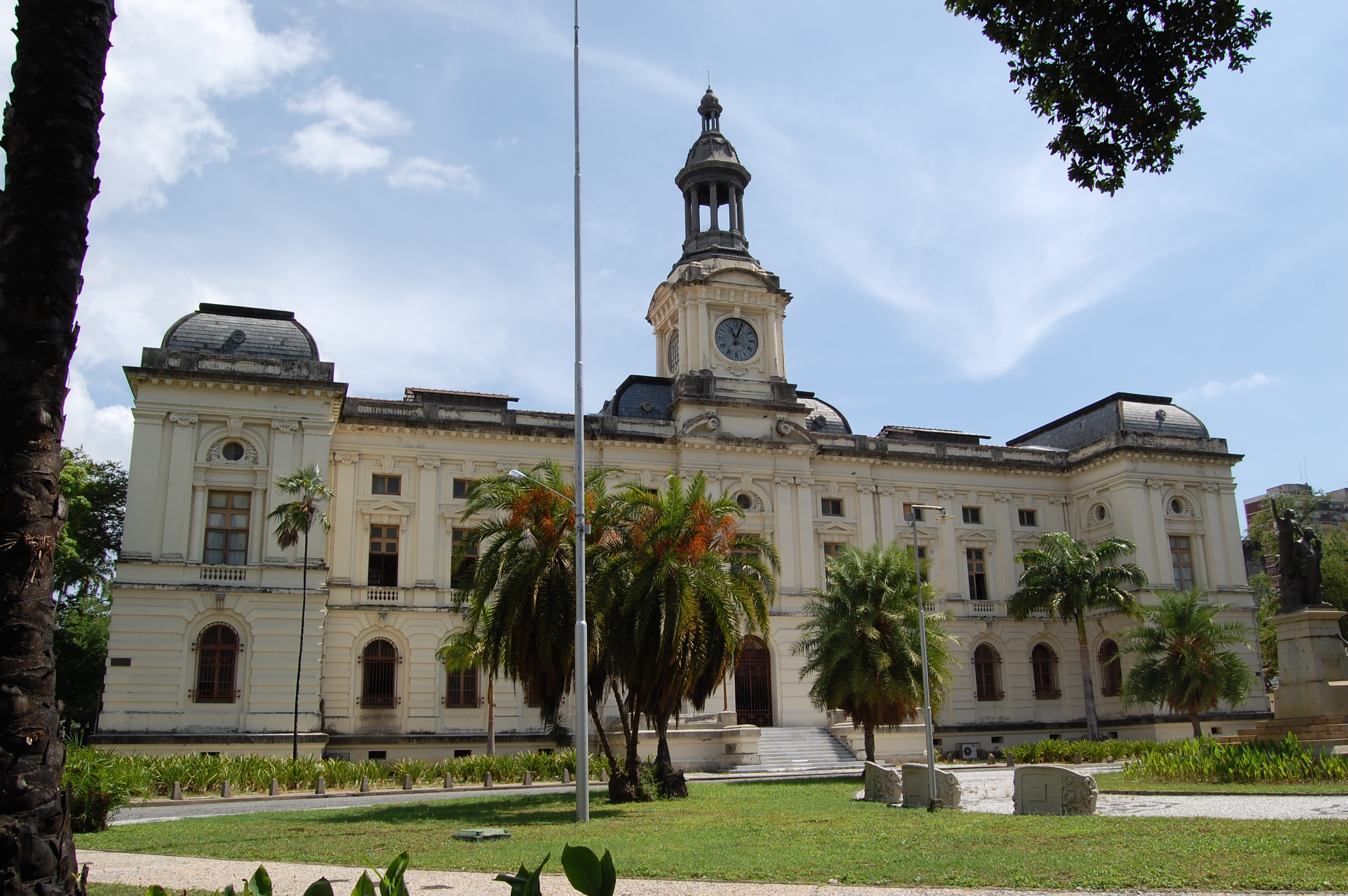
UFPE

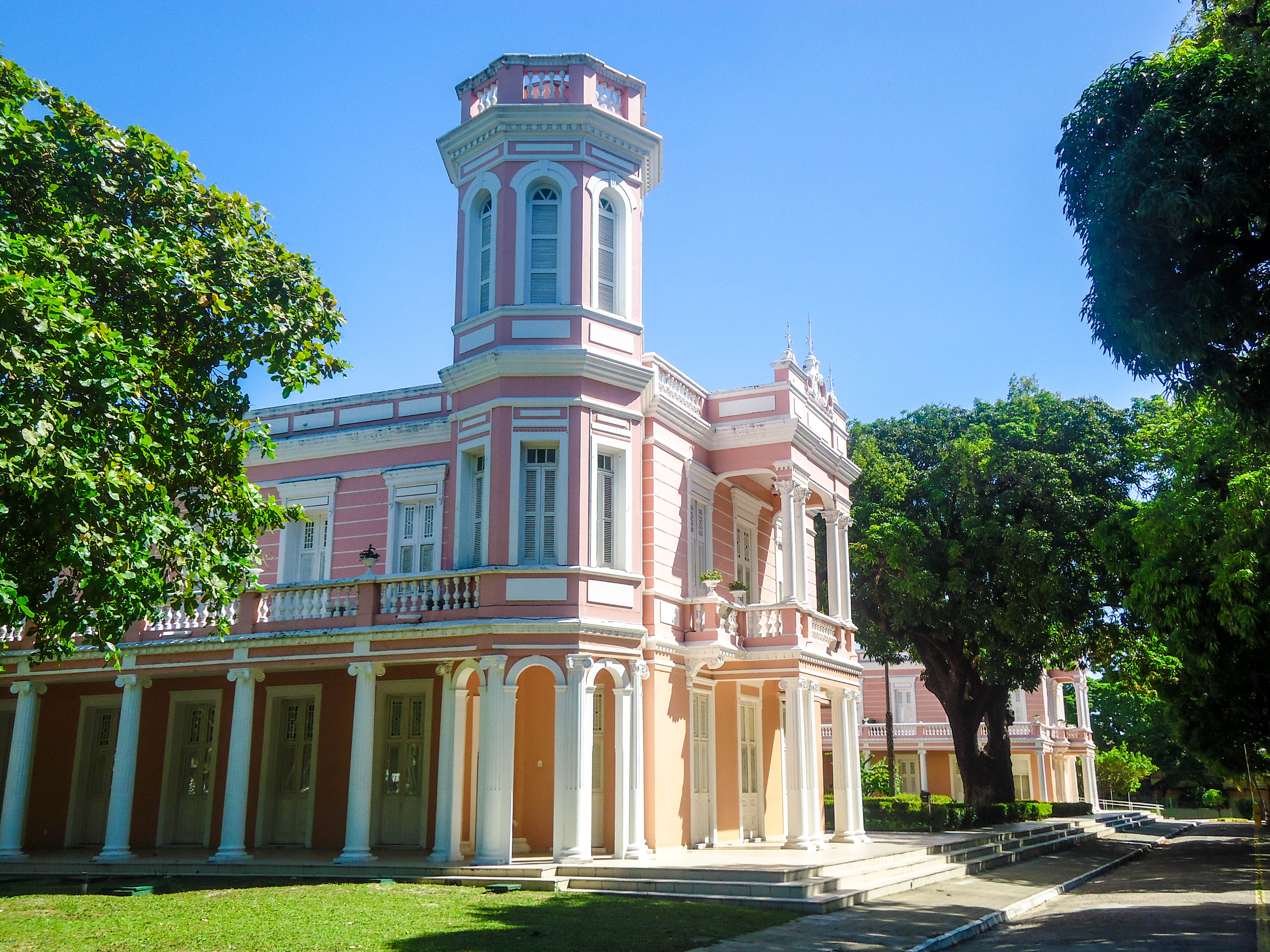
UFC

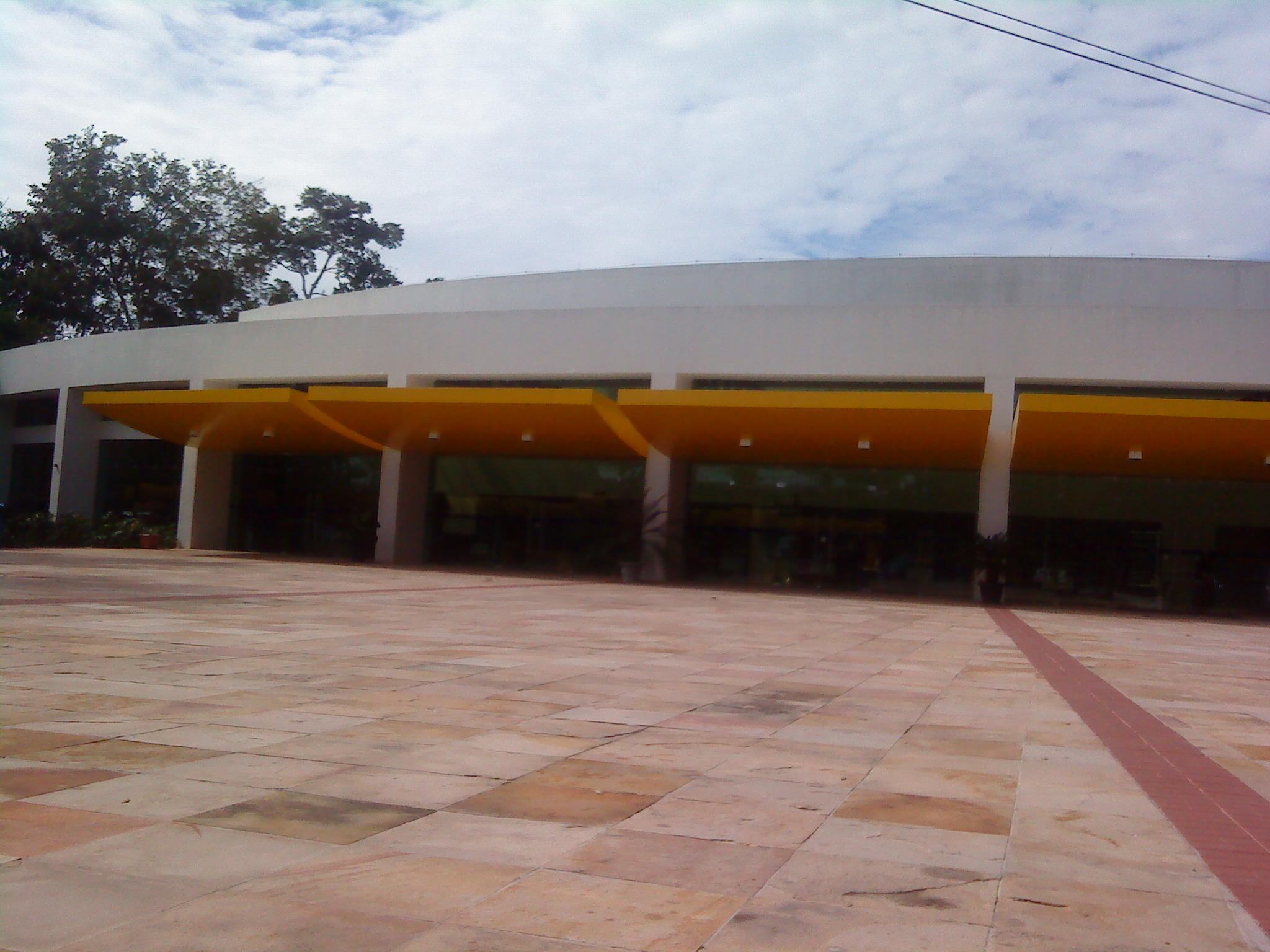
UFPA

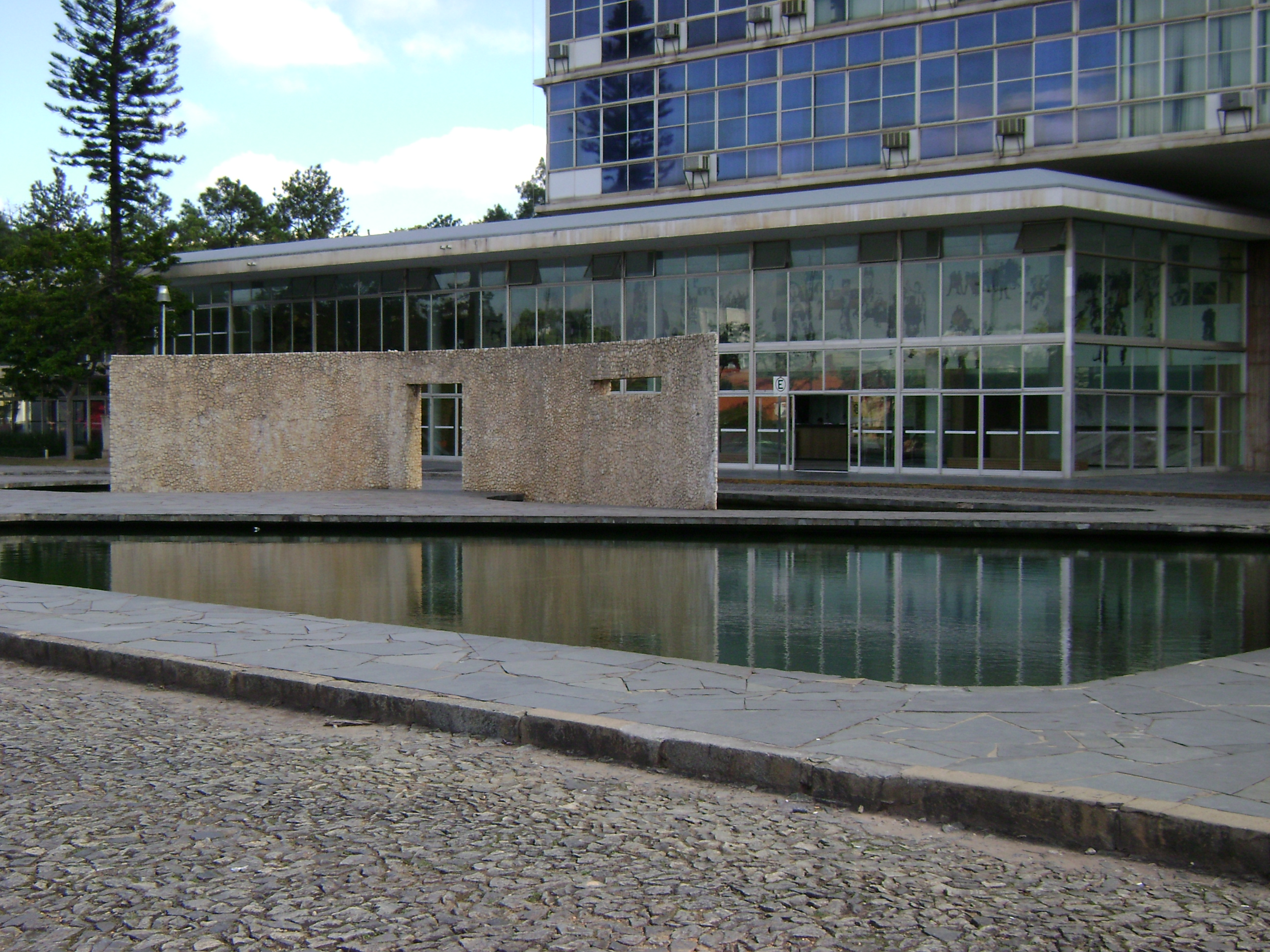
UFMG

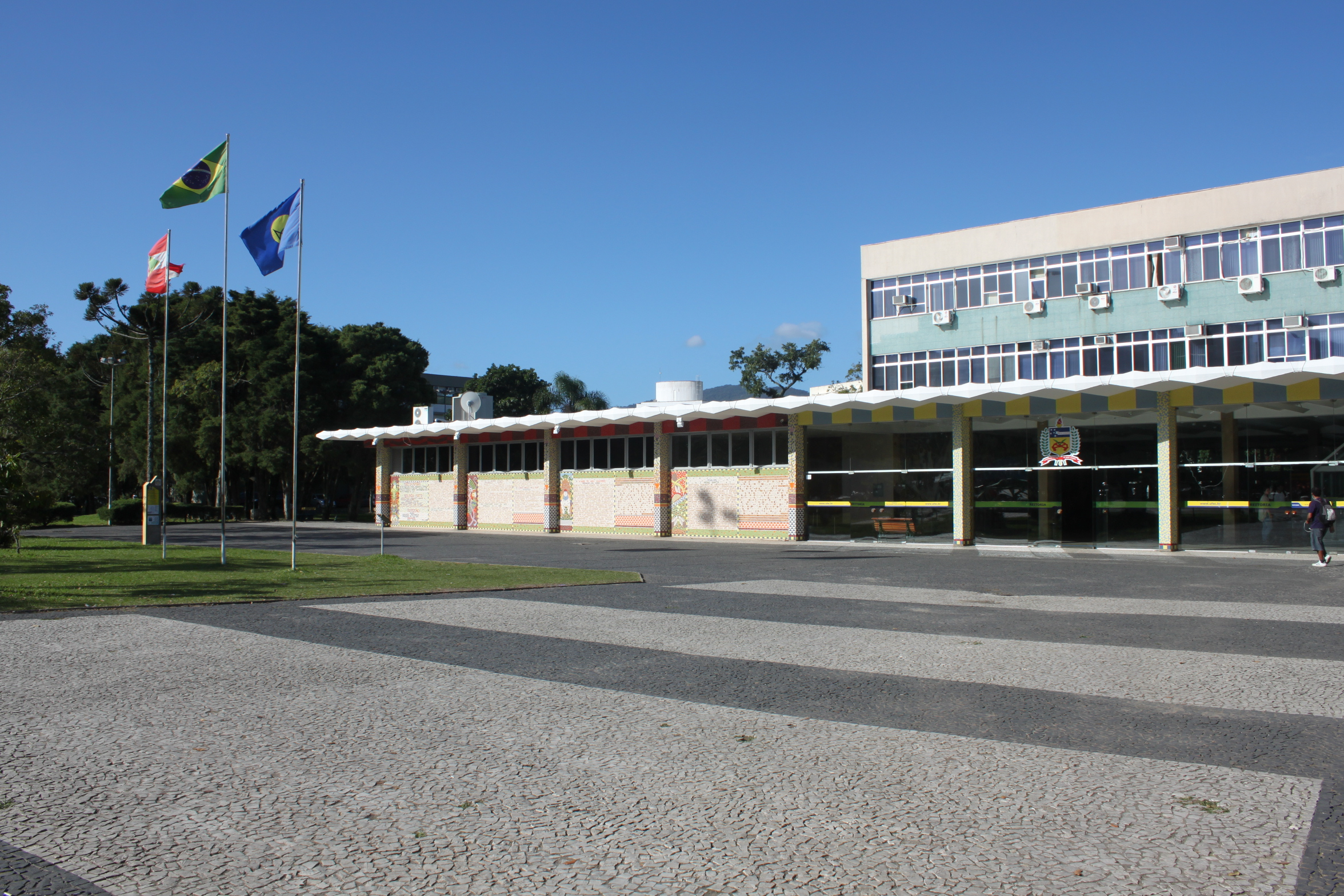
UFSC

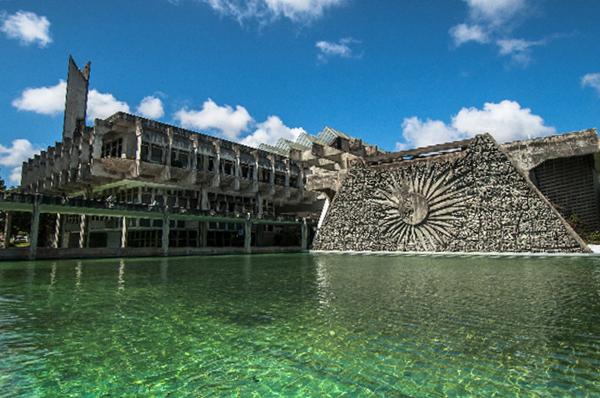
UFRN

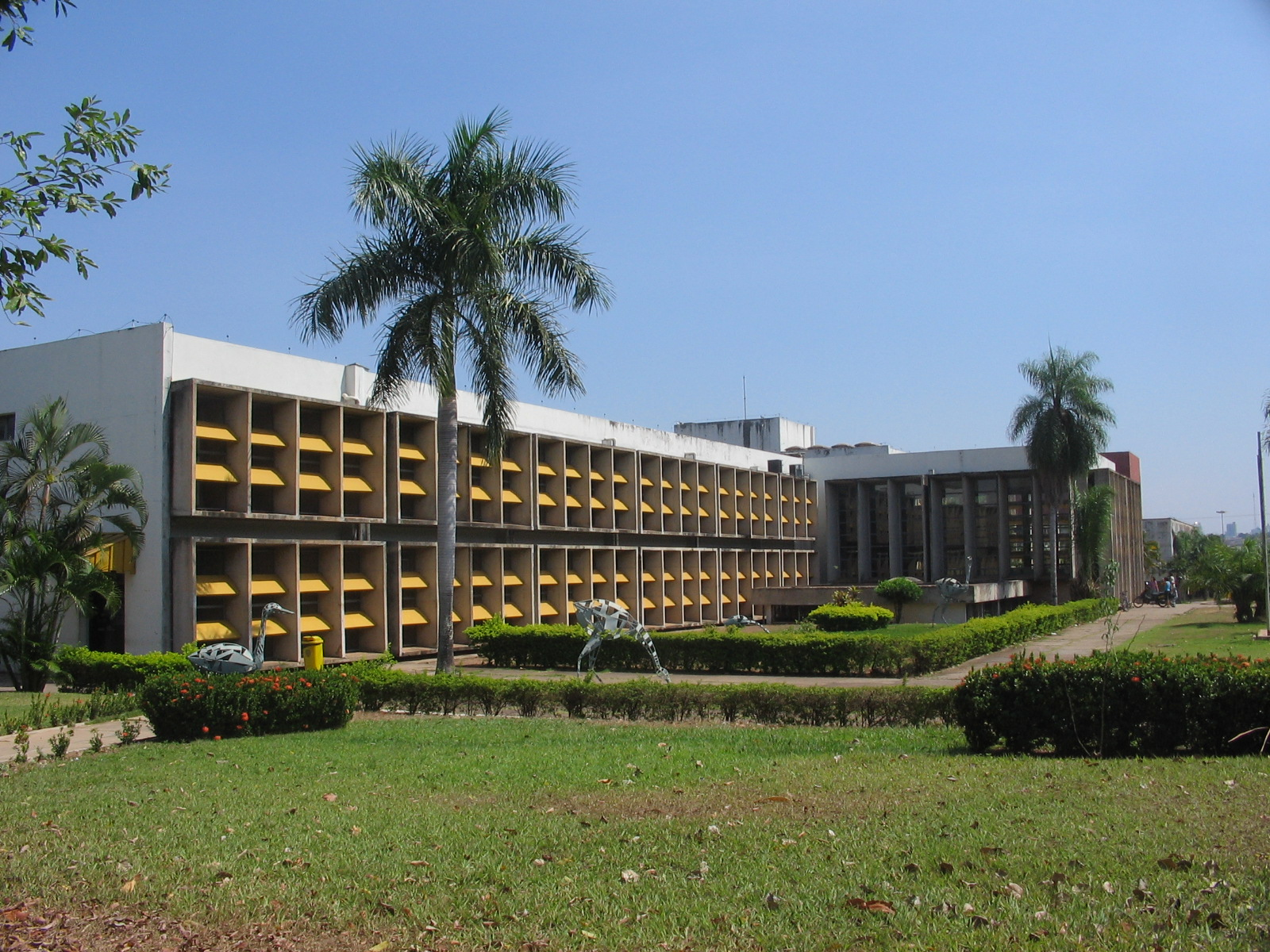
UFMT

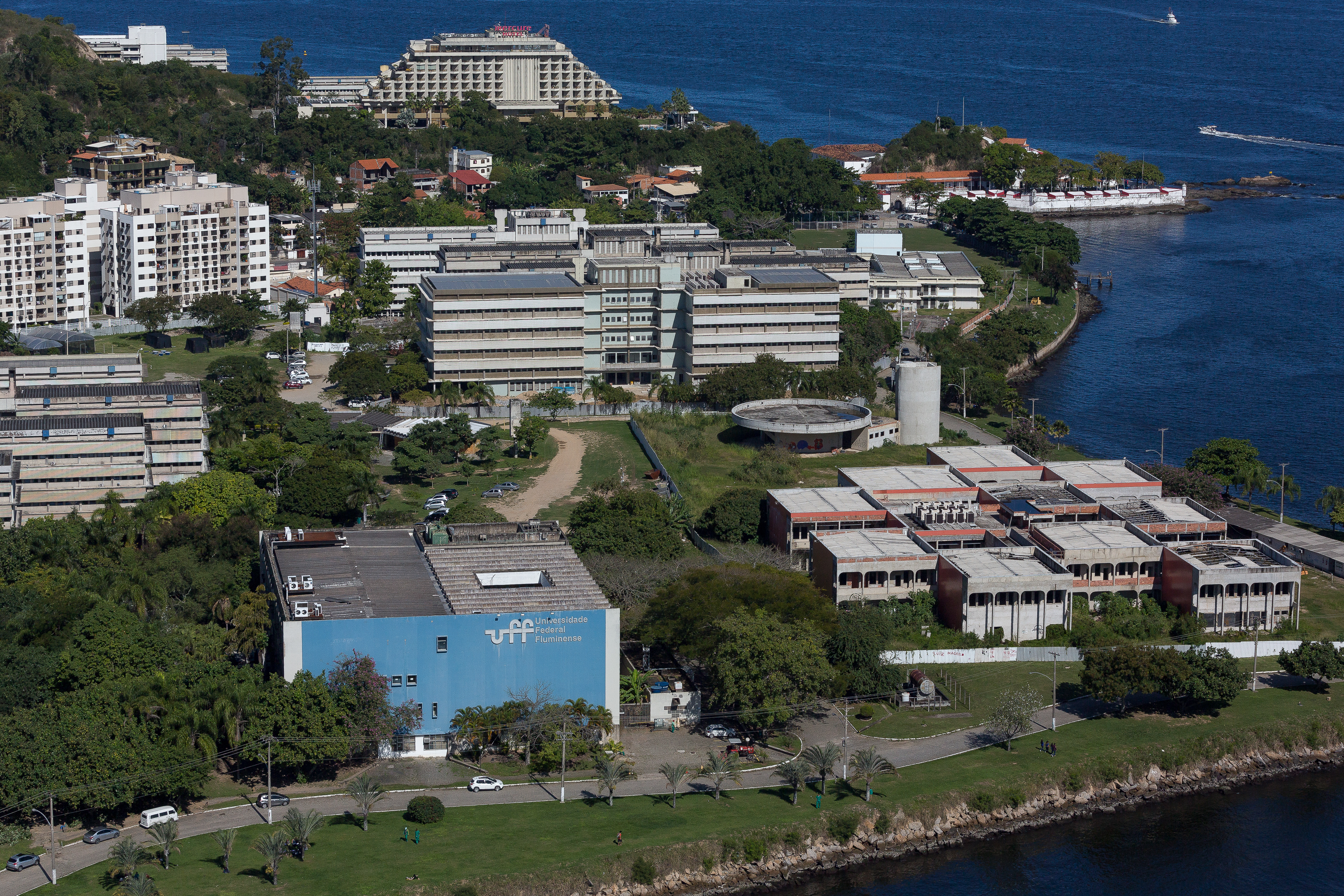
UFF

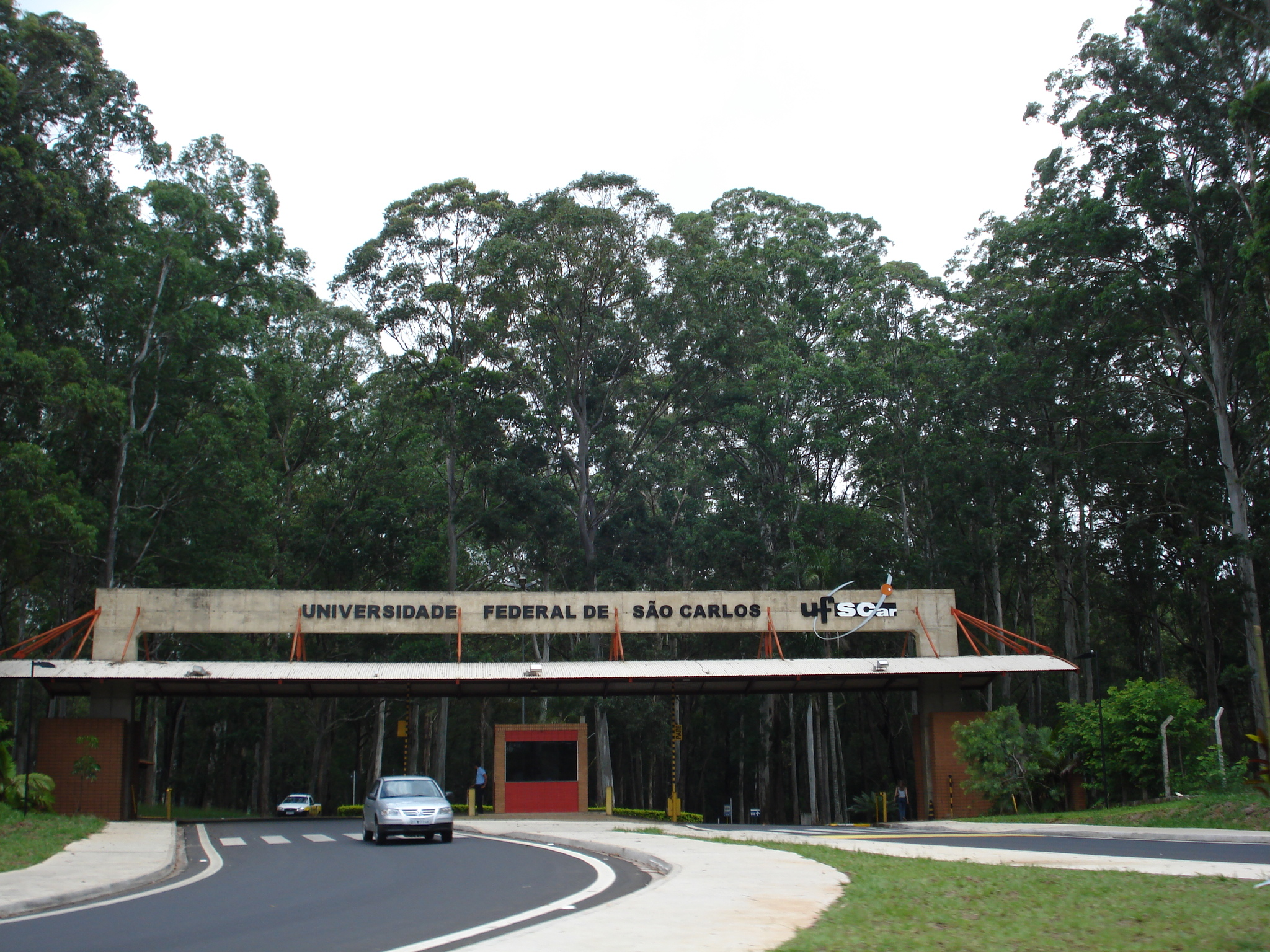
UFSCar

== See also ==
- Academic ranks in Brazil
- Bachelor's degree in Brazil
- Brazil university rankings
- Brazilian science and technology
- Coordenadoria de Aperfeiçoamento de Pessoal de Nível Superior (CAPES)
- Education in Brazil
- Federal Centers for Technological Education
- Federal Institute of Education, Science and Technology
- Instituto Nacional de Estudos e Pesquisas Educacionais Anísio Teixeira (INEP, National Institute for Research in Education)
- Lattes Platform (database for indexing Brazilian research and researcher CVs)
- List of universities in Brazil by state
- List of federal universities of Brazil
- Ministry of Education (Brazil)
- National Council for Scientific and Technological Development (CNPq)
- Graduate degrees in Brazil
- Undergraduate education in Brazil

== Sources ==
This article incorporates text from a free content work. Licensed under CC BY-SA 3.0 IGO. Text taken from Funding skills development: the private sector contribution, UNESCO, UNESCO. UNESCO.
