= Coordenação de Aperfeicoamento de Pessoal de Nível Superior =

Brazilian federal government agency

Coordenação de Aperfeiçoamento de Pessoal de Nível Superior (CAPES), or Brazilian Federal Agency for Support and Evaluation of Graduate Education, also known as CAPES Foundation, is a Brazilian federal government agency under the Ministry of Education, responsible for quality assurance in undergraduate and postgraduate institutions in Brazil.

The agency evaluates educational establishments every two years, and grades them according to the quality of the courses provided. Scores range from 1 to 7, where 1 is the lowest — the maximum that an institution offering up to a master's degree will gain is 5, whereas an institution offering a doctorate will gain up to A 7.

In 2007 it started offering the CAPES Elsevier Award to recognise outstanding scientists, with the award being restricted to women from 2013, to encourage more women to pursue scientific careers. Several awards were awarded each year, as of 2014.

== See also ==
- Bachelor's degree in Brazil
- Brazilian science and technology
- CNPq
- Graduate degrees in Brazil
- Lattes Platform
- QUALIS
- Universities and higher education in Brazil
- Undergraduate education in Brazil
