= Cape (surname) =

Cape is the surname of:

- Jack Cape (1911–1994), English footballer
- Joey Cape (born 1966), American singer, songwriter and producer
- Safford Cape (1906–1973), American conductor and musicologist
- Thomas Cape (1868–1947), English Member of Parliament

== See also ==
- Geoff Capes (1949–2024), British retired strongman and shot putter
- Jack Capes (1898–1933), English hockey players and cricketer
