= Irmã Kelly Patrícia =

Brazilian num and singer

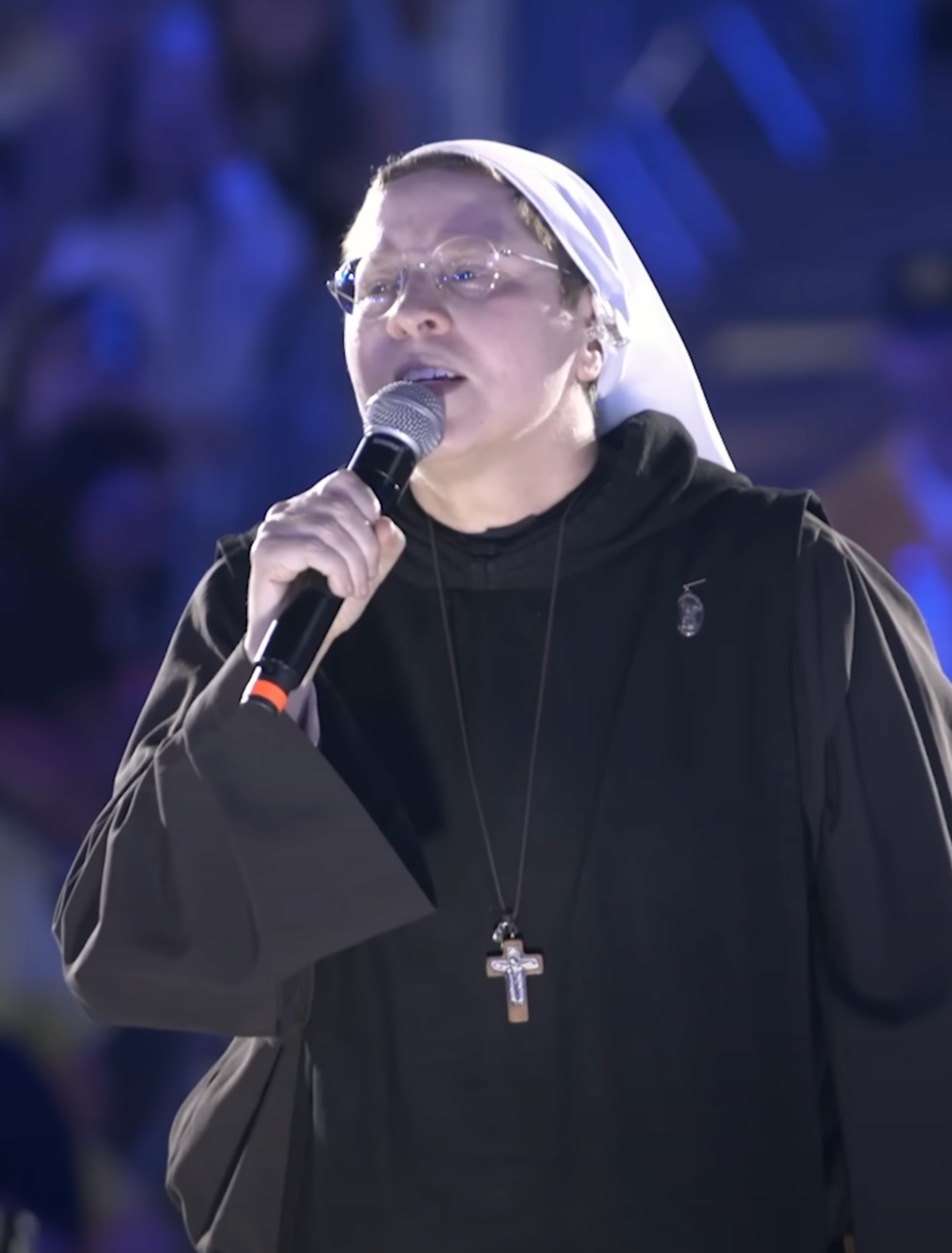
- Born: Kelly Patrícia; 1971 (age 54–55); Fortaleza, Ceará, Brazil
- Occupation: Religious sister · singer · songwriter
- Musical career
- Genres: Contemporary Catholic liturgical music, Contemporary Christian music
- Instrument: Vocals
- Years active: 1991-present

Kelly Patrícia (born 1971 in Fortaleza) is a Brazilian religious sister, singer, and songwriter, and the founder of the Instituto Hesed. Alongside Frei Gilson, she became known for her evangelization efforts through social media and music, establishing herself as one of the most prominent religious figures in Brazil.

== Biography ==
Irmã Kelly Patrícia was born in Fortaleza, Ceará, in 1971. At the age of fifteen, she was already playing instruments and singing at Jesus, Mary, and Joseph Parish in her hometown. In the 1990s, she began writing and performing Catholic music aimed at evangelization and spiritual reflection, with some of her songs drawing from the poetry of saints such as Thérèse of the Child Jesus, John of the Cross, and Teresa of Ávila. In 1991, she released the album Chama Viva do Amor, a tribute to the fourth centenary of Saint John of the Cross's birth; however, it was intended exclusively for convents and religious communities. The success of that album led her to release Sol de Amor the following year. Kelly Patrícia was a member of the Order of Carmelites from 1990 to 1992.

During her pilgrimage to Catholic sanctuaries in Europe, particularly to Medjugorje in 1996, Kelly Patrícia met Jane Madeleine, and a friendship began that would lead them to share a spiritual life together. In 1997, they founded the Instituto Hesed dos Irmãos e Irmãs da Santa Cruz e da Bem-Aventurada Virgem Maria do Monte Carmelo (Hesed Institute of the Brothers and Sisters of the Holy Cross and of the Blessed Virgin Mary of Mount Carmel). With the support of the archbishops of Fortaleza, Cláudio Hummes and José Antônio Aparecido Tosi Marques, the institute was officially recognized and authorized to receive vocations. In 2001, the male branch of the institute was established.

== Discography ==
- Chama Viva do Amor (1991)
- Sol de Amor (1992)
- Como num Deserto (1994)
- Cumpra-se Senhor (1995)
- Melhores Momentos (1996)
- Passos no Silêncio (1998)
- Et Verbum... (2000)
- Em uma Noite Escura (2002)
- Ofício da Imaculada (2003)
- O Santo Rosário (2003)
- Só Deus Basta (2004)
- Viver de Fé (2007)
- Terço da Misericórdia (2007)
- Verbi Sponsa – A Esposa do Verbo (2009)
- Busca de Deus (2010)
- Minha Mãe (2014)
- Ir. Kelly Patrícia Acústico (2015)
- Hesed É Misericórdia (2017)
- Adorar-Te Perpetuamente (2017)
- Minha Mãe, Minha Rainha (2019)
- Deus é Bom (2020)
- Jesus Divino (2024)
- Eu Te Amo Jesus (2024)
