= Frei Gilson =

Brazilian Catholic priest and singer

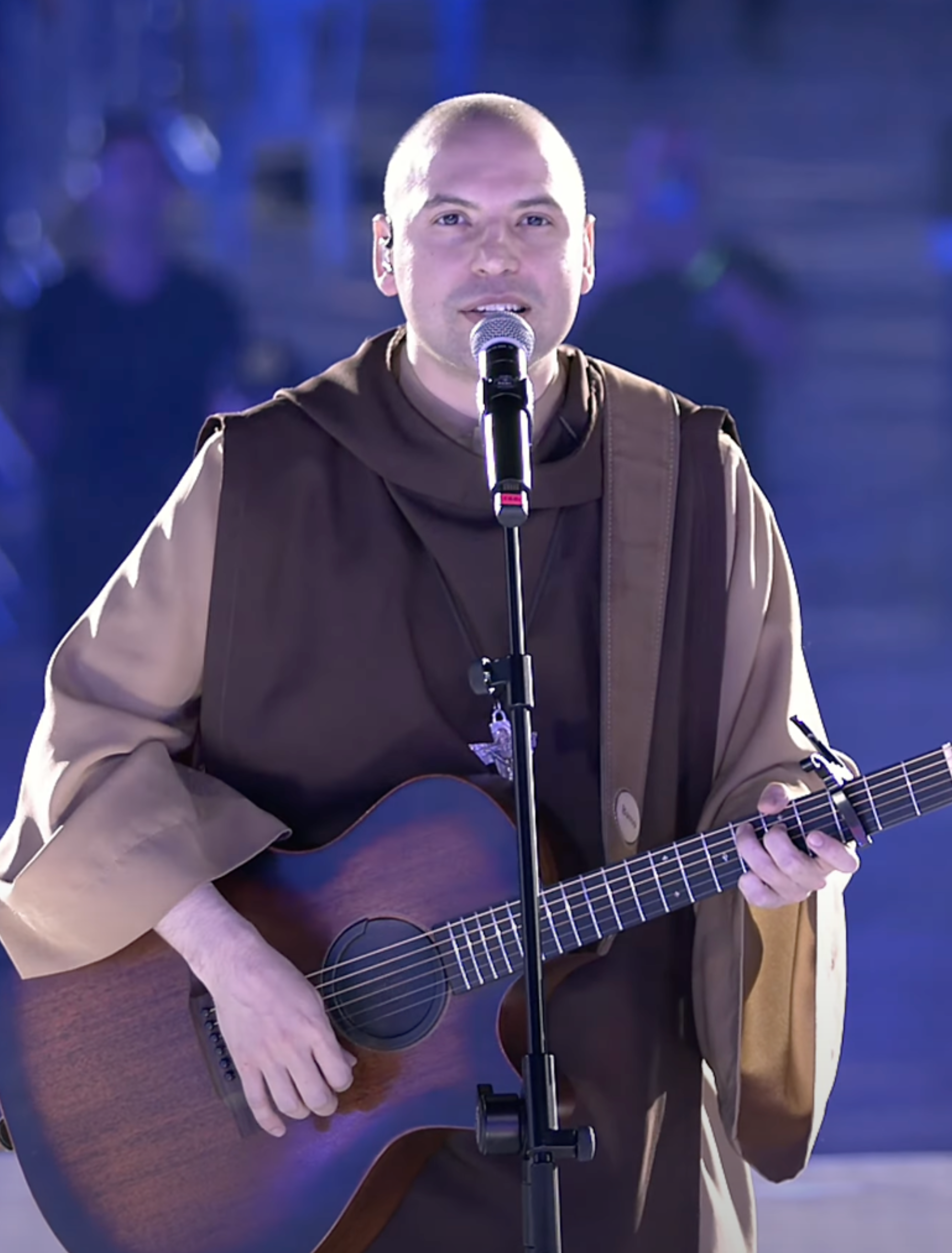
- Frei Gilson in 2025

Personal life
- Born: Gilson da Silva Pupo Azevedo; 17 December 1986 (age 39) São Paulo, Brazil

Religious life
- Religion: Catholic Church
- Order: Carmelite Messengers of the Holy Spirit
- Ordination: 7 December 2013

Military service
- Rank: Priest

Gilson da Silva Pupo Azevedo (born 17 December 1986), known as Frei Gilson (lit. 'Brother Gilson'), is a Brazilian Catholic priest and singer. A Carmelite friar, he is known for leading the ministry Som do Monte (Sound of the Mount), which seeks to spread religious messages through music. He gained prominence through his work on social media, becoming one of the most popular religious figures in Brazil. His biggest musical hit is the song Eu Te Levantarei (I Will Lift You Up).

== Biography ==
Frei Gilson was born in São Paulo on 17 December 1986. The son of divorced parents, he was raised by his mother and grandmother. When he was nine years old, his mother began attending the Catholic Church and enrolled her son in catechism classes. Gilson became interested in the church when he began playing the guitar in the prayer group led by his mother in the Paraisópolis favela. At the age of 18, he entered religious life by joining the Congregation of the Carmelite Messengers of the Holy Spirit. He was ordained a priest on 7 December 2013.

Gilson gained fame through his work on social media. By April 2022, he had reached 3 million followers on YouTube, making his channel one of the top ten most-viewed among religious content creators in Brazil. That same year, he also amassed a similar following on Instagram. Additionally, he scored hits widely streamed on music platforms, such as Eu Te Levantarei (I Will Lift You Up), Eu Seguirei (I Will Follow), and Tu És o Centro (You Are the Center).

On social media, Frei Gilson became known for hosting late-night livestreams featuring praying the Rosary. In one notable broadcast on 25 March 2022, he was joined by Bishop Dom José Ruy Gonçalves Lopes of the Diocese of Caruaru to consecrate Russia and Ukraine to the Immaculate Heart of Mary. In 2025, his live broadcast of the Rosary during Lent surpassed one million viewers. Regarding his late-night streams, Gilson explains that the idea came as a form of personal sacrifice during Lent and the forty days leading up to the feast of Saint Michael the Archangel, which cause millions to wake up at four in the morning.

In March 2025, statements made by the priest based on biblical passages—specifically concerning the role of women in the Book of Genesis—generated widespread attention and controversy over accusations of misogyny. The episode became the subject of legal analysis by jurist Lucas Peixoto Dantas on the portal Jus.com.br. In the article, the author argued that the preaching of traditional dogmas and principles of Christianity is protected by entrenchment clauses of the 1988 Brazilian Constitution, such as freedom of speech and freedom of religion. He further contended that attempts to criminalize discourse based on sacred texts could constitute violations of fundamental rights, infractions under the Brazilian Penal Code regarding offenses against religious feelings, and breaches of international treaties such as the Universal Declaration of Human Rights.

== Discography ==
- 2015 - Salvos Pela Cruz
- 2016 - Santo Sacrifício
- 2017 - Redenção
- 2018 - Acoustic Som do Monte
- 2018 - Eu Vou Crer em Ti
- 2019 - Revival Night
- 2020 - A Hora Milagrosa
- 2021 - Não Há Mais Vendaval
- 2023 - Frei Gilson In Concert

== See also ==
- Irmã Kelly Patrícia

== Bibliography ==
- Silveira, Emerson José Sena da (2022). "Batinas reacionárias e a cruzada digital: Quando um catolicismo claudicante chega ao tempo presente". PLURA - Revista de Estudos de Religião (in Portuguese). 12 (2): 34–63. doi:10.29327/256659.13.2-4. ISSN 2179-0019.
