= Jus Navigandi =

Brazilian legal website and online magazine

- Native name: Jus Navigandi
- Website type: Legal portal and online magazine
- Owner: Jus Navigandi Ltda.
- Creator: Paulo Gustavo Sampaio Andrade
- Website: jus.com.br
- Commercial: No (offers optional premium subscription and legal services)
- Registration: Optional
- Launched: November 19, 1996
- Current status: Active

Jus Navigandi (currently also known by its primary domain Jus.com.br) is a Brazilian legal portal and online magazine, recognized as the oldest active legal website in the country. Founded on November 19, 1996, in Teresina, Piauí, by law student Paulo Gustavo Sampaio Andrade, the platform became a major reference for legal doctrine, court templates, and legal discussions on the Brazilian internet.

Its name is derived from a Latin phrase meaning "right to navigate", referencing web navigation in cyberspace.

== History ==
=== Foundation and early years (1996–1999) ===
Jus Navigandi was developed in mid-1996 when founder Paulo Gustavo Sampaio Andrade first accessed the commercial internet at the library of the Federal University of Piauí (UFPI). The website officially launched on the night of November 19, 1996, hosted on the free web hosting service GeoCities, operating at a time when major Brazilian public institutions—such as the Superior Court of Justice (STJ) and the Chamber of Deputies—did not yet have web pages.

At launch, the site primarily served as a web directory cataloging approximately 500 legal websites existing in Brazil at the time. In 1997, during the trial regarding the murder of Indigenous leader Galdino Jesus dos Santos, the platform offered comprehensive legal coverage by collecting court documents, prosecution appeals, legal opinions, and reader-submitted articles, establishing its collaborative content model.

In January 1998, the platform acquired its own domain name, `jus.com.br`, and adopted an ad-supported free-content business model.

=== Expansion and academic recognition (2000–2010) ===
In September 2000, Jus Navigandi was cataloged and recognized by the Brazilian Institute of Information in Science and Technology (IBICT) as an online periodical, receiving the international ISSN 1518-4862. In the same year, the initiative was formally incorporated as Jus Navigandi Ltda., headquartered in Teresina.

According to a 2004 study by Alexa Internet, Jus Navigandi ranked as the most visited independent legal website in Brazil, surpassing traffic metrics of official websites of higher courts such as the STJ, the Superior Labor Court (TST), and the Supreme Federal Court (STF).

On August 11, 2005, the portal entered a content and web hosting partnership with Brazilian web portal Universo Online (UOL), expanding its infrastructure and hiring a dedicated editorial staff.

=== Rebranding and consolidation (2010–present) ===
Over the years, the online magazine published original articles and contributions from prominent Brazilian jurists and legal figures, including Miguel Reale, Gilmar Mendes, Alexandre de Moraes, Sergio Moro, and Deltan Dallagnol.

In 2017, the platform underwent a rebranding, officially adopting its web domain name, Jus.com.br. The platform also expanded its features to include legal Q&A forums and networking services connecting lawyers with clients.

== Structure and content ==
The portal operates under the curation of an editorial board that reviews academic papers submitted by jurists, lawyers, magistrates, and students. Its publications are indexed and academically recognized by CAPES (Coordination for the Improvement of Higher Education Personnel).

The website's structure includes:

- Doctrine and Articles: Scientific papers, essays, and analysis of case law and legislation.
- Court Templates and Forms: A repository of legal petitions, contract templates, and practical legal documents.
- Legal News and Forums: News coverage of court rulings and a collaborative community forum.
