= Qualis (CAPES) =

System qualifying academic journals

Qualis is a Brazilian official system with the purpose of classifying scientific production. It is maintained by the Coordenadoria de Aperfeiçoamento de Pessoal de Nível Superior (CAPES), a government agency linked to the Brazilian Ministry of Education.

Qualis has the task to classify and evaluate the academic means used on the production of scientific publications of post-graduate programs (such as master theses and doctoral dissertations). The classification itself occurs by a system of grades, per field of evaluation, and depends on the level of circulation (local, national or international) and on the quality of the journal (A, B, or C).

== Grades ==
The classification is updated every four years and follows a series of criteria defined by CAPES, such as: number of issues, indexation, number of publishing institutions, impact factor based on JCR, etc. The grades (so called "strata") occur in a 1–8 scale (A1, the highest; A2; B1; B2; B3; B4; B5; C — not listed).

== See also ==
- Lattes Platform
- Journal ranking by country
