= Cape class =

There are multiple classes of vessels known as Cape class:

- Cape-class cutter, 95-foot cutters built for the United States Coast Guard circa 1950
- Cape-class maintenance ship, modified World War II freighters that served in the Royal Navy, Royal Canadian Navy, and Royal Netherlands Navy
- Cape-class motor lifeboat, 47 motor lifeboats first introduced into the Canadian Coast Guard in 1999
- Cape-class patrol boat, a class of large patrol boats operated by the Australian Border Force, Royal Australian Navy, and the Trinidad and Tobago Coast Guard
- Cape class, or capesize, cargo vessels too large to transit the Suez Canal
