= Cape Island (disambiguation) =

Cape Island is a man made island at the southern tip of Cape May County, New Jersey.

Cape Island may also refer to:

- Cape Island, New Jersey, now Cape May
- Cape Island, Newfoundland and Labrador, Canada
- Cape Island, Nova Scotia, Canada
- SS Cape Island (T-AKR-10), a Naval transport moored in Tacoma, Washington
