= Capes Lake =

- Location within Vancouver Island
- Location: Vancouver Island, British Columbia
- Coordinates: 49°34′00″N 125°18′00″W
- Lake type: Natural lake
- Basin countries: Canada

Capes Lake is a lake located on Vancouver Island west of the south end of Comox Lake.

== See also ==
- List of lakes of British Columbia
