= Cape (writ) =

In archaic English law, a cape was a judicial writ concerning a plea of lands and tenements; so called, as most writs are, from the word which carried the chief intention of the writ.

The writ was divided into cape magnum, or the grand cape, and cape parvum, or the petit cape. While they were alike in their effect, as to taking hold of immovable things, they differed in the following circumstances: first, in that the cape magnum lay before, and the cape parvum after; second, cape magnum summoned the defendant to answer to the default, in addition to answering to the plaintiff, while cape parvum only summoned the defendant to answer to the default. It might have been called petit cape, not because of small force, but because it was contained in few words.

Cape magnum was defined in the Old Natura Brevium as follows:

"Where a Man hath brought a Precipe quod reddet of a Thing that touches Plea of Land, and the Tenant makes default at the Day to him given in the original Writ; then this Writ shall be for the King to take the Land into his Hands : and if the Tenant come not at the Day given him by the Writ, he loses his land."

Cape parvum was defined was thus defined, Ibid.

"Where the Tenant is summon'd in Plea of Land, and comes at the Summons, and his Appearance is recorded; and at the Day given him, prays the View; and having it granted, makes default : then shall this Writ issue for the King", etc.

Cape ad valentiam, a species of cape magnum so called from the end to which it tends, was thus described,

"Where I am impleaded of Lands, and I vouch to warrant another, against whom the Summons ad Warrantandum hath been awarded, and the Sheriff comes not at the Day given; then, if the Defendant recover against me, I shall have a Writ against the Vouchee; and shall recover so much in value of the Lands of the Vouchee, if he has so much : otherwise, I shall have Execution of such Lands and Tenements as descend to him in Fee; or, if he purchase afterwards, I shall have a Re-summons against him : And if he can say nothing, I shall recover the Value."
