= Lattes Platform =

Information system about researchers and institutions in Brazil

The Lattes Platform is an information system (integrated database, web-based query interface, etc.) maintained by the Brazilian federal government to manage information on science, technology, and innovation related to individual researches and institutions working in Brazil.

It is named after the Brazilian physicist César Lattes. It is managed by the National Council for Scientific and Technological Development.

All researchers and institutions are required to maintain their records up to date. The platform can be used to obtain information on individual researchers and also to conduct performance evaluations at the organization level.

== See also ==
- Brazilian science and technology
- Qualis (CAPES)
- Universities and higher education in Brazil
