= Cape (telecommunications company) =

American telecommunications company

- Industry: Mobile virtual network operator
- Founder: John Doyle
- Headquarters: Washington, D.C., U.S.
- Services: Mobile virtual network operator
- Parent: Private Tech, Inc
- Website: www.cape.co

Cape is an American mobile virtual network operator (MVNO) founded in 2022. The company provides privacy-focused cellular service designed to reduce user exposure to surveillance, data collection, and network-based attacks.

== History ==
Cape was founded in 2022 by John Doyle, a former head of national security at Palantir Technologies and a U.S. Army Special Forces veteran. Doyle established the company after identifying vulnerabilities in cellular networks.

The company initially marketed its services to security-sensitive professionals before expanding to users such as investigative journalists, activists, and survivors of domestic violence. Cape was contracted by the US Navy in 2024 to develop a secure cellular network for Naval Base Guam. Cape Obscura, a mobile phone in their catalogue, was included among the Time Best Inventions of 2025. The company launched an open beta program in March 2025 and became generally available in the United States in 2026.

As of 2026, the company reported total funding of $190 million and a valuation of approximately $900 million.

== Technology ==
Cape runs its own mobile core network, which comprises the software infrastructure needed to route messages and function as a telecom provider.

The company’s system uses varied technologies to prevent surveillance and unauthorized access to user data, including features against SIM swapping, SS7 attacks, and IMSI catchers. Cape phones feature IMSI rotation which changes the cellular user’s unique identifier every 24-hours.

The service is designed to collect minimal personal information from users and retain it for limited periods.

== Products and services ==
Cape allows users multiple phone numbers per account, encrypted voicemail, and defenses against SS7-based tracking. The consumer version works with both iPhone and Android devices.

Cape has partnered with several organizations to offer its privacy services to vulnerable populations: in November 2025, Cape partnered with EFF to offer their cell service free to vetted journalists; and with Safe Escape to do the same with domestic abuse survivors.

Cape Obscura is available to military and government personnel, and other high-risk individuals. Cape Obscura pairs a SIM with a hardened Android device profile to rotate cellular identifiers such as IMSI and IMEI.
