= Computer-aided production engineering =

CAPE International Conference logo

Computer-aided production engineering (CAPE) is a relatively new and significant branch of engineering. Global manufacturing has changed the environment in which goods are produced. Meanwhile, the rapid development of electronics and communication technologies has required design and manufacturing to keep pace.

== Description of CAPE ==
CAPE is seen as a new type of computer-aided engineering environment which will improve the productivity of manufacturing/industrial engineers. This environment would be used by engineers to design and implement future manufacturing systems and subsystems. Work is currently underway at the United States National Institute of Standards and Technology (NIST) on CAPE systems. The NIST project is aimed at advancing the development of software environments and tools for the design and engineering of manufacturing systems.

== CAPE and the Future of Manufacturing ==
The future of manufacturing will be determined by the efficiency with which it can incorporate new technologies. The current process in engineering manufacturing systems is often ad hoc, with computerized tools being used on a limited basis. Given the costs and resources involved in the construction and operation of manufacturing systems, the engineering process must be made more efficient. New computing environments for engineering manufacturing systems could help achieve that objective.

The importance of CAPE is similar to the same way that product designers need computer-aided design systems, manufacturing and industrial engineers need sophisticated computing capabilities to solve complex problems and manage the vast data associated with the design of a manufacturing system.

In order to solve these complex problems and manage design data, computerized tools must be used in the application of scientific and engineering methods to the problem of the design and implementation of manufacturing systems. Engineers must address the entire factory as a system and the interactions of that system with its surrounding environment. Components of a factory system include:

- the physical plant housing the manufacturing facility;
- the production facilities which perform the manufacturing operations;
- the technologies used in the production facility;
- the work centers/stations, machinery, equipment, tools, and materials which comprise or are used by the production facilities;
- the various support facilities;
- the relationship between the factory and its environment.

CAPE must not only be concerned with the initial design and engineering of the factory, it must also address enhancements over time. CAPE should support standard engineering methods and problem-solving techniques, automate mundane tasks, and provide reference data to support the decision-making process.

The environment should be designed to help engineers become more productive and effective in their work. This would be implemented on personal computers or engineering workstations which have been configured with appropriate peripheral devices. Engineering tool developers will have to integrate the functions and data used by a number of different disciplines, for example:

- manufacturing, industrial and plant engineering;
- materials processing and quality engineering;
- environmental engineering,
- mathematical modeling/simulation, statistical process control and computer science,
- economic and cost analysis and management science,

Many of the methods, formulas, and data associated with these technical areas currently exist only in engineering handbooks. Although some computerized tools are available, they are often very specialized, difficult to use, and do not share information or work together. Engineering tools built by different vendors must be made compatible through open systems architectures and interface standards.

== What CAPE will look like ==
CAPE will be based on computer systems that provide an integrated set of design and engineering tools. These software tools will be used by a company's manufacturing engineers to continuously improve its production systems. They will maintain information about manufacturing resources, enhance production capabilities, and develop new facilities and systems. Engineers working on different workstations will share information through a common database.

Using CAPE, an engineering team will prepare detailed plans and working models for an entire factory in a matter of days. Alternative solutions to production problems could be quickly developed and evaluated. This would be a significant improvement over current manual methods which may require weeks or months of intensive activity.

To achieve this goal, a new set of engineering tools are needed. Examples of functions which should be supported include:

- identification of product specifications and production requirements;
- producibility analysis for products and modification of product designs to address manufacturability issues and management, scheduling and tracking of projects;
- modeling and specification of manufacturing processes and plant layout and facilities planning;
- consideration of various economic/cost tradeoffs of different manufacturing processes, systems, tools, and materials;
- analysis supporting selection of systems/vendors and procurement of manufacturing equipment and support systems;
- task and work place design;
- compliance with various regulations, specifications, and standards, and control of hazardous materials.

The tools implementing these functions must be highly automated and integrated; and will need to provide quick access to a wide range of data. This data must be maintained in a format that is accessible and usable by the engineering tools. Some examples of the information that might be contained in these electronic libraries include:

- production process models and data and generic manufacturing systems configurations;
- machinery and equipment specifications, and vendor catalogs;
- recommended methods, practices, algorithms, etc., and benchmarking data;
- typical plant/system layouts,
- cost estimation models, labor rates, other cost data and budget templates,
- time standards, industrial standards, project plans, and laws/government regulations.

These on-line libraries would allow engineers to quickly develop solutions based upon the work of others.

Another critical aspect of this engineering environment is affordability, which can best be achieved by designing an environment that can be constructed from low cost "off-the-shelf" commercial products, rather than custombuilt computer hardware and software. The basic engineering environment must be affordable. For both cost and technical reasons, it must be designed to be able to support incremental upgrades. Incremental upgrades would allow companies to add capabilities as they are needed. Commercial software products must be easy to install and integrate with other software already in use. These capabilities exist to a limited extent in some general purpose commercial software today, e.g., word processors, databases, spreadsheets.

== Technical Concerns ==
Many technical issues must be considered in the design and development of new engineering tools for CAPE. These issues include:

- required functionality of the tools themselves;
- formalization and refinement of engineering methods;
- development of on-line technical reference libraries, and user engineering and graphics visualization;
- user engineering and graphics visualization techniques;
- system connectivity and information sharing, and integration standards for the computing environment;
- incorporation of intelligent behavior in the tools.

There are three critical elements to be addressed: creating a common manufacturing systems information model; using an engineering life cycle approach; and developing a software tool integration framework.

Resolution of these elements will help ensure that independently developed systems will be able to work together. The common information model should identify the elements of the manufacturing system and their relationships to each other; the functions or processes performed by each element; the tools, materials, and information required to perform those functions; and measures of effectiveness for the model and its component elements.

There have been many efforts over the years to develop information models for different aspects of manufacturing, but no known existing model fully meets the needs of a CAPE ernviroment. Therefore, a life cycle approach is needed to identify the different processes that a CAPE environment must support, and must define all phases of a manufacturing system or subsystem's existence. Some of the major phases which may be included in a system life cycle approach are, requirements identification; system design specification; vendor selection; system development and upgrades; installation, testing, training; and benchmarking of production operations.

Management, coordination, and administration functions need to be performed during each phase of the life cycle. Phases may be repeated over time as a system is upgraded or re-engineered to meet changing needs or incorporate new technologies.

A software tool integration framework should specify how the tools could be independently designed and developed. The framework would define how CAPE tools would deal with common services, interact with each other and coordinate problem solving activities. Although some existing software products and standards currently address the common services issue, the problem of tool interaction remains largely unsolved. The problem of tool interaction is not limited to the domain of computer-aided manufacturing systems engineering—it is pervasive across the software industry.

== CAPE's current state ==
An initial CAPE environment has been established from commercial off-the-shelf (COTS) software packages. This new environment is being used to demonstrate commercially available tools to perform CAPE functions, to develop a better understanding and define functional requirements for individual engineering tools and the overall environment, and to identify the integration issues which must be addressed to implement compatible environments in the future.

Several engineering demonstrations using COTS tools are under development. These demonstrations are designed to illustrate the various types of functions that must be performed in engineering a manufacturing system.

Functions supported by the current COTS environment include: system specification/diagramming, process flowcharting, information modeling, computer-aided design of products, plant layout, material flow analysis, ergonomic workplace design, mathematical modeling, statistical analysis, line balancing, manufacturing simulation, investment analysis, project management, knowledge-based system development, spreadsheets, document preparation, user interface development, document illustration, forms and database management.

== Notes ==
1. CAPE
2. NIST Study
3. NIST Study
4. NIST Study
5. NIST Study
6. NIST Study

== Sources ==
1. J.P. Tanner, Manufacturing Engineering: An Introduction to Basic Functions, Marcel Dekker, New York, 1991.
2. G. Salvendy (ed.), Handbook of Industrial Engineering, Wiley Interscience, New York, 1992.
3. D. Dallas (ed.), Tool and Manufacturing Engineers Handbook, McGraw-Hill, New York, 1976.
4. W.D Compton (ed.), Design and Analysis of Integrated Manufacturing Systems, National Academy Press, Washington, DC, 1988
