= Cape (software company) =

American software company

Cape is a California-based company that has developed a cloud-based software for Aerial Telepresence of drones. It is the first platform for full commercial drone telepresence and the first company in the U.S. to be awarded Section 333 and Part 107 waivers by the FAA. The company was founded in 2014 and operates in the US, Canada, New Zealand, Middle East, Mexico, and Australia. By May 2018, it had performed more than 100,000 successful drone flights. Chris Rittler serves as a CEO of the company and Kabe Termes is the director of operations.

== Business model ==
Cape is a software that works on a cloud-based system and allows the complete control of connectivity and management of commercial drones offsite over the web. The platform allows the users to fly and control the drones safely with ultra-low latency and high-resolution video. It automates the process for users and can be accessed from mobile devices such as laptops and smartphone applications.

The application of the software extends to users from the government, military and enterprise sectors. They have also received investment from Telstra Ventures, Google's Gradient Ventures, Mitsui & Co. and NEA.

In 2017, Cape started working with the Chula Vista Police Department to test the application of their software for the Drone program. In August 2018, after the success of tests, Chula Vista Police Department started officially implementing the software.

In October 2017, the Ensenada Police Department in Mexico implemented the software to their drone program to help minimize crime rates. Crime rates were reduced by more than 10 percent after drones equipped with the Cape Aerial Telepresence platform.

In August 2018, the San Diego Fire Department's first UAS Integration Pilot Program (IPP) demonstration took place after completing a public UAS deployment with Cape drones.
