= Cape Horner =

Sailors who have rounded Cape Horn aboard a sailing ship

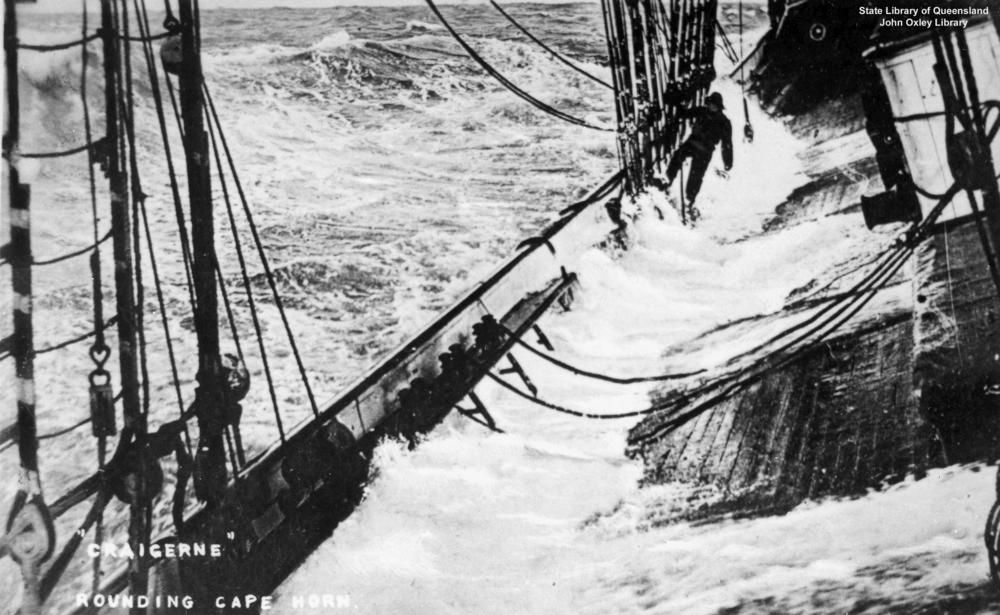
Rounding Cape Horn

A Cape Horner is a sailor who has sailed around Cape Horn on a sailing ship. The Association Amicale Internationale des Capitaines au Long-Cours-Cap Horniers, founded in St Malo by a group of French sailing ship Master Mariners, defined the terms under the rules of their membership as "having sailed round Cape Horn in square rigged sailing ships."

The following countries have all been active members of AMICALE: Germany, Australia, Belgium, Canada, Chile, Denmark, the United States of America, Finland, the Netherlands, UK, Åland, Italy, Norway, New Zealand and Sweden.

Due to the death of most of its members, the Federated Congress of AMICALE decided to put an end to the international entity, which was definitively dissolved on May 15, 2003. However, the following countries have decided to continue their activities independently : Germany (ending mid-September 2004), Australia, Chile, Finland, England, Aland Islands and New Zealand. To this relationship must be added the Caphorniers Foundation of Holland and the Cape Horn Club of Norway, both made up of sympathizers of the original Brotherhoods. A small French group also continues, as does an official Chilean group sponsored and supported by the Chilean Navy: the Chilean Section of the Cape Horn Captains Brotherhood, the "Cape Horners".

Cape Horner may also refer to a ship that has rounded Cape Horn.

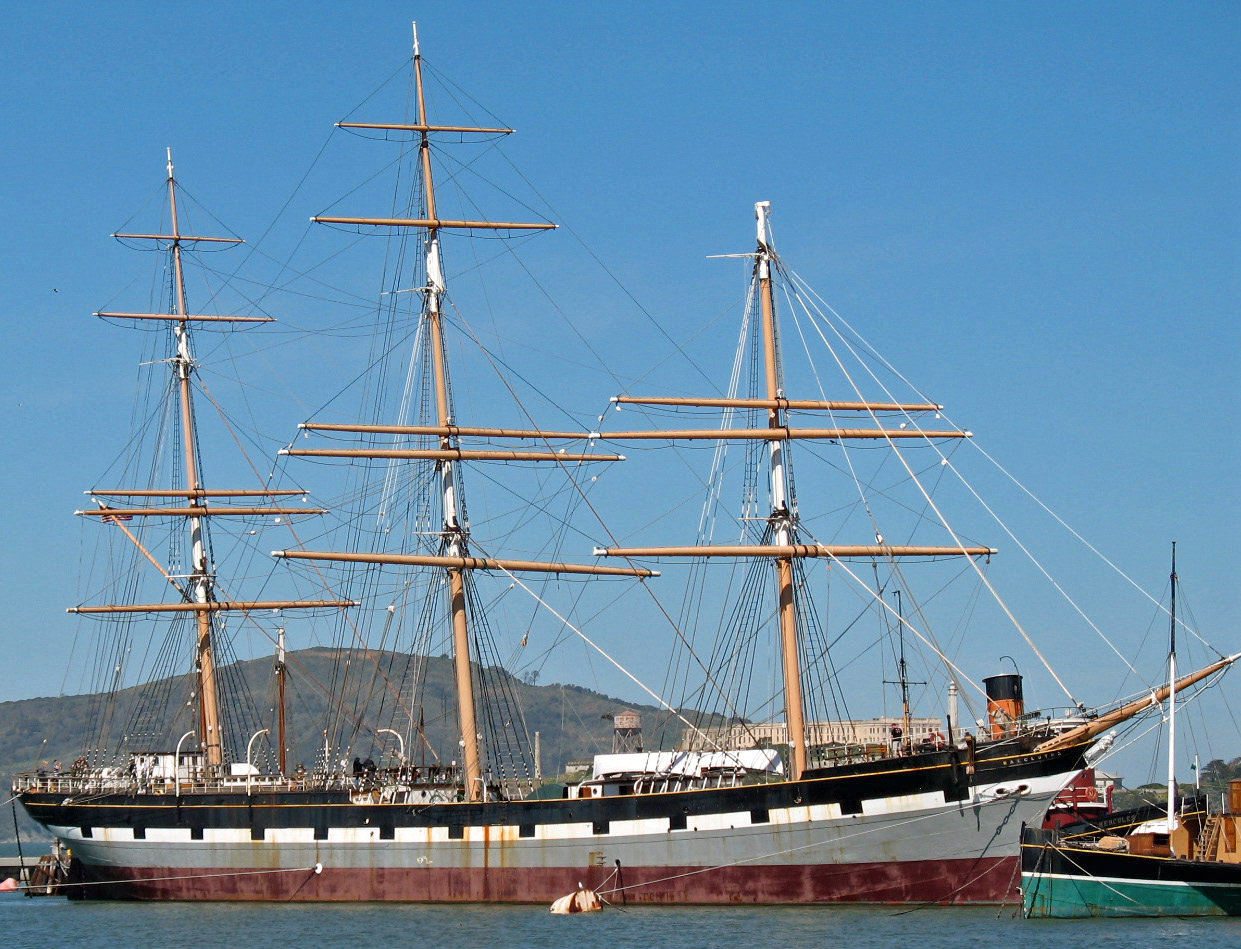
Balclutha (San Francisco)

Balclutha rounded Cape Horn a record 17 times in thirteen years, with a crew of 26.

A Cape Horner that has passed the Horn, the Cape of Good Hope (South Africa), and Cape Leeuwin (Australia) is known as a three cape.

== Gallery ==
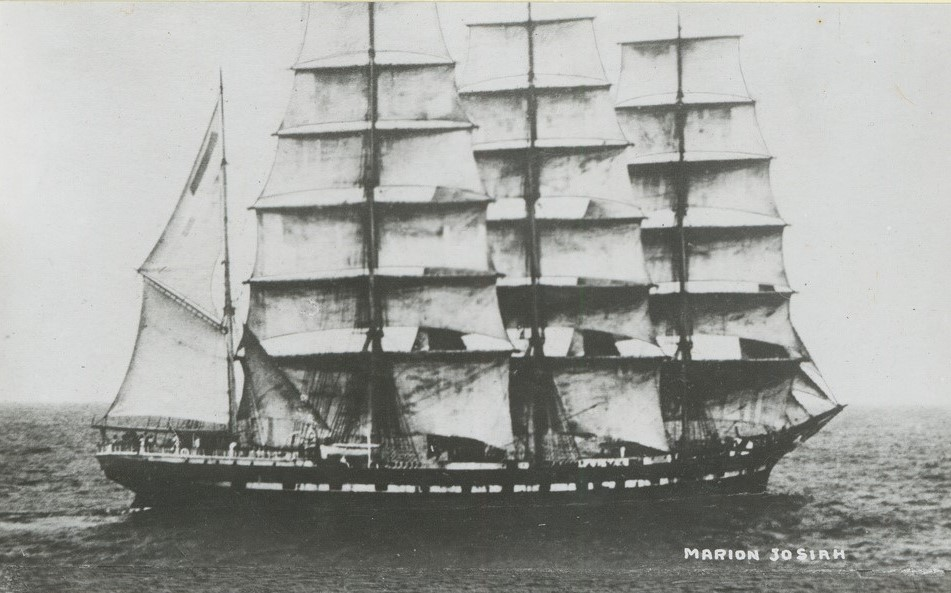
The Marion Josiah

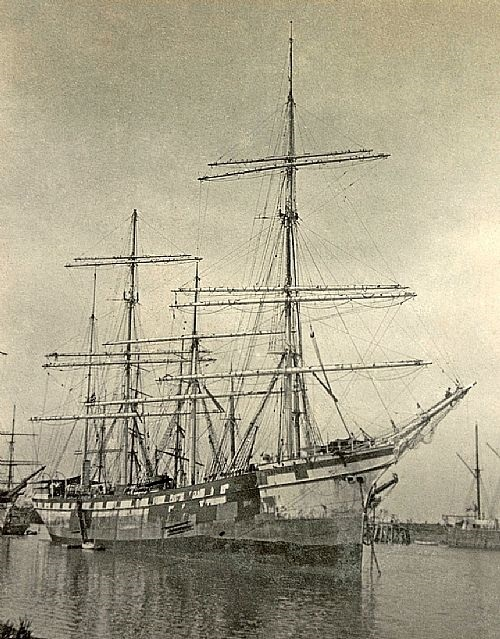
A dismasted Marion Josiah in Valaparaiso

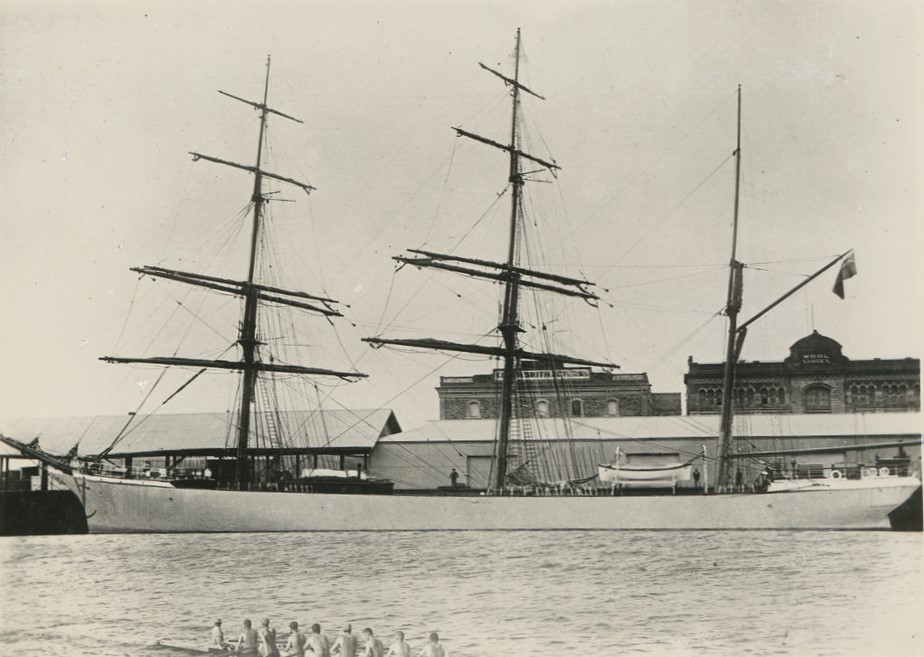
The don

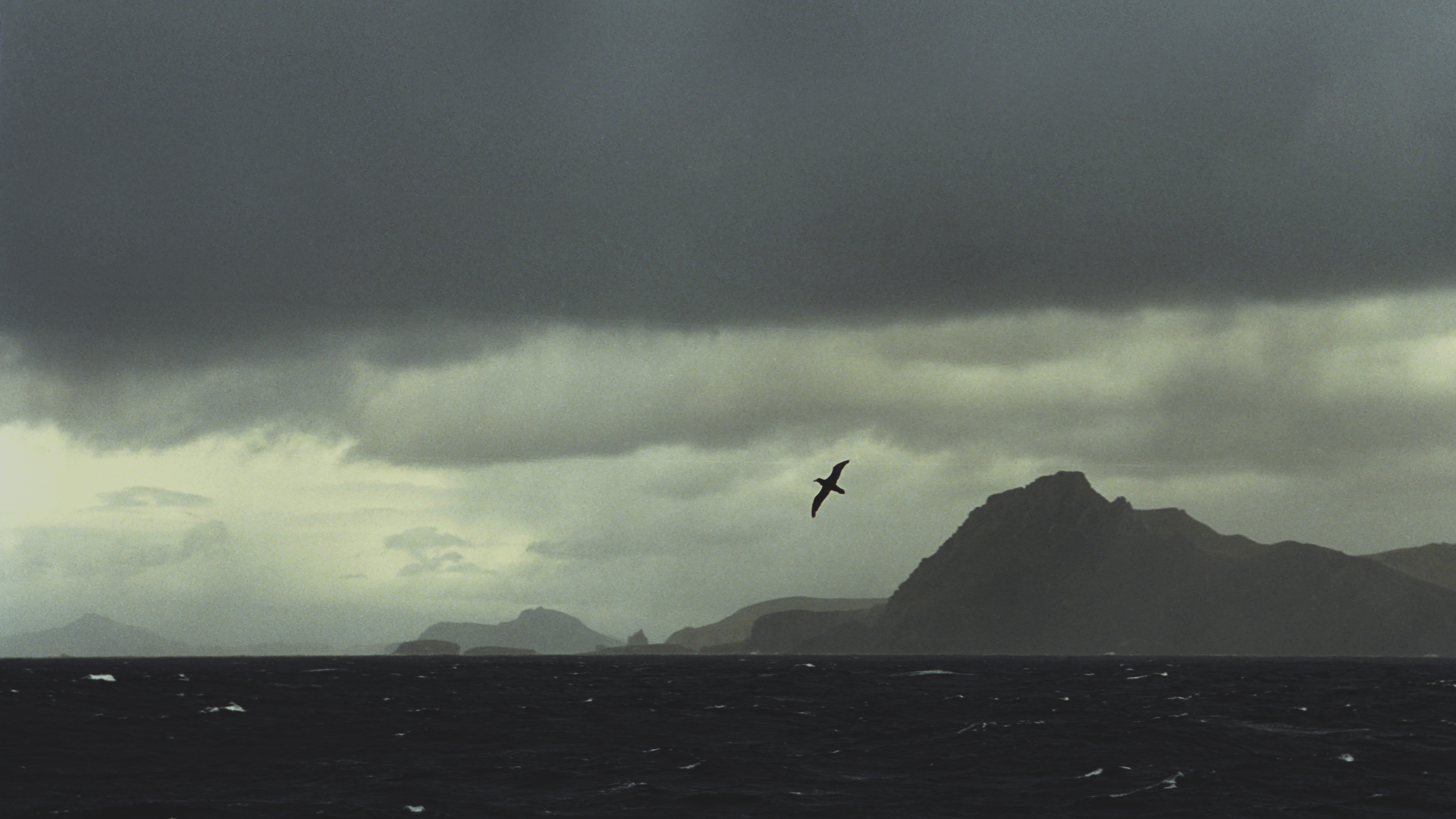
Cape Horn

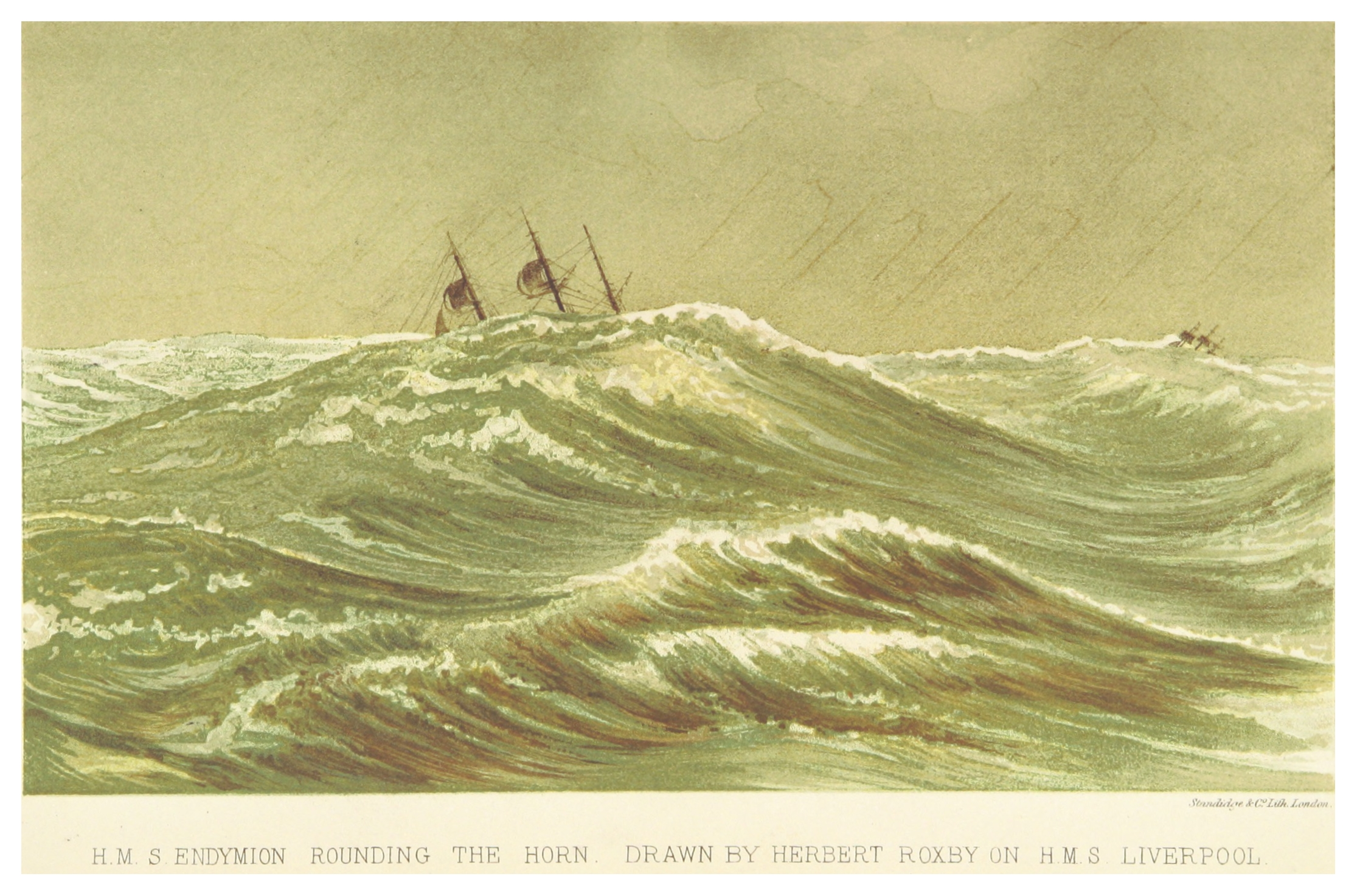
Rounding the Horn

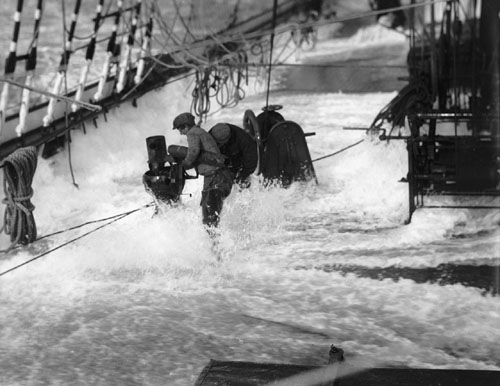
Awash round Cape Horn

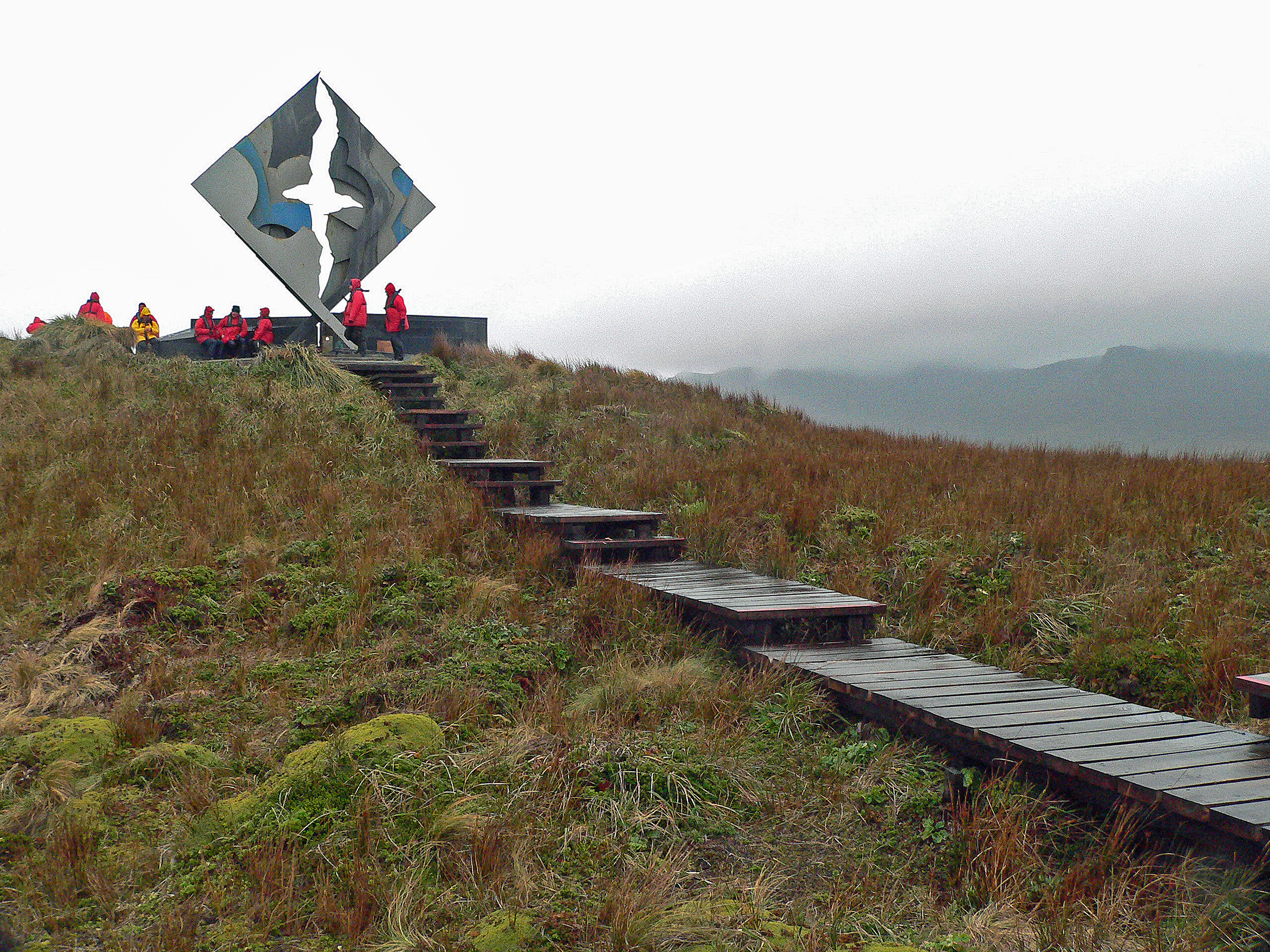
Horn Monument an Albatross in tribute to cape Horners
