= Jack Capes =

English cricketer and hockey player (1898–1933)

Personal information
- Full name: Charles John Capes
- Born: 5 January 1898; Forest Hill, London
- Died: 16 February 1933 (aged 35); Ospedaletti, Liguria, Italy
- Batting: Right-handed
- Bowling: Left-arm medium pace

Domestic team information
- Years: Team
- 1923–1928: Kent

Career statistics
Competition	First-class
Matches	33
Runs scored	534
Batting average	16.18
100s/50s	0/1
Top score	65*
Balls bowled	3,954
Wickets	55
Bowling average	25.10
5 wickets in innings	2
10 wickets in match	0
Best bowling	7/20
Catches/stumpings	46/–
- Source: CricInfo, 15 April 2017

Charles John Capes (5 January 1898 – 16 February 1933), known as Jack Capes, was an English amateur hockey player and cricketer. He played for the England hockey team and for Kent County Cricket Club between 1923 and 1928. He served in the British army during World War I.

== Early life and education ==
Capes was born in Forest Hill in London in 1898, the son of Matthew and Amy Capes. His father was a master printer. He attended Heathfield School in Keston in Kent from 1904 until 1912 and then Malvern College where he was in the school Cricket XI in 1914 and 1915. He was a school prefect and head of house at Malvern, played in the football team and was in the Officers' Training Corps. He passed the Army Entrance Exam in 1916 and graduated from Sandhurst after a six-month, war-shortened course later the same year.

== Military service ==
After graduating from Sandhurst, Capes was commissioned as a 2nd Lieutenant in the Royal West Kent Regiment (RWK) in October 1916. After a period of training in Britain, he was posted with the 2nd Battalion, RWK in Mesopotamia, initially at Basra. He served in the area for the remainder of World War I in the region and was promoted to Lieutenant in April 1918. He saw action at the Battle of Sharqat in October 1918 immediately before the Armistice of Mudros brought the war with Turkey to an end.

Capes returned to England in April 1919 and was demobilised, resigning his commission in November the same year. He was briefly recalled to the army during the 1921 General Strike.

== Sporting career ==
Capes' Wisden obituary says that he was "better known as an English International hockey player". He played hockey many times for the South in international trial matches and represented the England hockey team in 1926.

He made his Second XI debut for Kent in 1920 and played a few matches for the team before making his first-class cricket debut for the county in 1923. He was awarded his Kent county cap in 1927 and played a total of 33 first-class matches for the county, playing his final first-class match in 1928. He played club cricket for Beckenham and toured the Netherlands in 1931 with Free Foresters.

== Death ==
Capes was ill for some time and died at Ospedaletti in Italy in 1933 aged 35.

== Bibliography ==
- Carlaw, Derek (2020). Kent County Cricketers, A to Z: Part Two (1919–1939) (PDF). Cardiff: ACS.
