= List of writs =

This is a list of writs. Some of the writs listed below are abolished or obsolete in certain countries.

== A ==
- Acquietandis Plegiis, a writ that lies for a surety against a creditor who refuses to acquit him after a debt is paid.
- Writ of assistance issues out of the exchequer to authorise any person to take a constable to seize goods prohibited or uncustomed.
- Arrestandis bonis ne dissipentur, a writ which lies for a man whose goods etc. are taken by another, who during the contest does or is like to make them away.
- Arrestando ipsum qui pecuniam recepit, a writ that lies for apprehending a person who hath taken the King's prest money to serve in the wars, and hides himself when he should go.
- Arresto facto super bonis mercatorum alienigenorum, a writ which lies for a denizen against the goods of an alien in recompense of goods taken from him in a foreign country after denial of restitution.
- Attachment
- Attaint
- Audita querela

== B ==
- Bahio amovendo, a writ to remove a bailiff from his office for want of sufficient land in his bailiwick.
- Beaupleader
- Besayle is a writ directed to the sheriff, in case of an abatement or disseisin, to summon a jury to view the land in question, and to recognise whether the great grandfather died seised of the premises, and whether the demandant be his next heir.
- Brief, any writ in writing issued out of any of the King's courts of record at Westminster, whereby anything is commanded to be done in order to justice.

== C ==
- Cape is a writ judicial touching pleas of lands etc. It is divided into cape magnum and cape parvum, both which take hold of things immovable. The former lies before appearance and the latter after.
- Capias is of several kinds:
  - Ad respondendum, to have the body in court to answer the plaintiff.
  - Ad satisfaciendum, to take the body in satisfaction of the debt.
  - Utligatum, to apprehend an outlawed person.
  - In withernam, where a distress is carried out of the county and an equal amount of the distrainor's goods are to be taken instead.
- Casu consimili, a writ of entry granted by the curtesy or for life aliens in fee or in tail, or for another's life.
- Casu proviso, is a writ of entry given by the Statute of Gloucester c 7, where a tenant in dowry transfers property to another in fee, or for term of life, or in tail; the writ lies for him in reversion against the transfer..
- Catallis captis nomine districtionis is a writ that lies within a borough or house for rent going out of the same, and warrants a man to take the doors, windows or gates by distress for rent.
- Catallis reddendis, a writ which lies where goods are delivered to a man to keep a certain day, and are not upon demand delivered at the day. (See further detinue)
- Certiorari
- Cessavit
- Computo
- Contra formam feoffamenti
- Contributione facienda
- Coram nobis
- Cui ante divortium is a writ that a woman divorced has to recover lands, etc., from him to whom her husband had alienated during marriage.
- Cui in vita is a writ of entry which a widow has against him to whom her husband alienated her lands, which must contain in it that during his life (cui in vita) she could not withstand it.

== D ==
- Day writ. The king may grant a writ of warrantia diei to any person which shall save his default for one day, be it in plea of land or other action, and be the cause true or not; and this is by his prerogative.
- Deceptione, a writ that lies properly against him who deceitfully does anything in the name of another.
- Decies tantum, a writ that lay against a juror who has taken money for giving his verdict, called so because it is to recover ten times as much as he took. 38 Edw 3 cc 12 and 13, or 34 Edw 3 c 8. It lay also against sheriffs taking rewards for arraying a panel. 11 Hen 6 c 14; Vin Abr 378.
- Dedimus potestatem
- De effendo quietum de tolonio, a writ which lies for those who are by privilege freed from the payment of poll.
- De expensis militum, a writ commanding the sheriff to levy so much a day for the expenses of a Knight of the Shire. 4 Inst 46.
- De exoneranda pro rata portionis is a writ that lies where one is distrained for rent that ought to be paid by others proportionably with him.
- De lunatico inquirendo is a writ issued to commence a court proceeding to determine whether a person is a lunatic (see Testamentary capacity).
- De quibus sur disseisin, a writ of entry.
- Detinue is a writ which lies where any man comes to goods by delivery or finding and refuses to deliver them. 1 Inst 286.
- Diem clausit extremum, a writ out of chancery to the escheator of the county upon the death of any of the king's tenants in capita, to inquire by a jury of what lands he died seised, their value and who was next heir to him.
- Distringas, a writ to the sheriff to distrain one of his goods to enforce compliance with what is required of him.
- Distringas juratores, a writ to the sheriff to distrain upon a jury to appear.
- Domo reparanda, a writ for one against his neighbour, by the fall of whose house he apprehends injury to his own.
- Dote assignanda, a writ that lay for a widow where it was office found that the king's tenant was seised in fee or tail at the day of his death, and that he held of the king. In which case she came into chancery and there made oath she would not marry without the king's leave, and thereupon she had this writ to the escheator. 15 Edw 3 c 4.
- Dote unde nihil habet, a writ of dower against one who bought land of her husband, who was seised in such sort that their issue might have inherited. FNB 147.
- Dum non fuit compos, a writ that lies against the alienee for him that, not being of sound mind, aliened his lands.
- Dum fuit infra aetatem, a writ that lies for him that, before he came of age, made a feoffment of his land.

== E ==
- Ejectione custodiae, a writ which lies against him who casts out a guardian from any land during the minority of the heir.
- Elegit, a writ of execution against the lands of a debtor. 1 Inst 289; 13 Edw 1 c 18.
- Entry, writ of, directed to the sheriff, commanding the tenant to render to the demandant possession of lands, or appear in court and show why he has not done it. It is of four kinds. Writ of entry sur disseisin; a writ of entry sur disseisin in the per; a writ of entry sur disseisin in the per and cui, and a writ of entry sur disseisin in the post. 1 Inst 238.
- Error, writ of, a commission to judges of the superior court to examine the record upon which a judgment was given in an inferior court. Jenk Rep 25.
- Estrepement
- Excommunicato deliberando, a writ to the sheriff for the delivery of an excommunicate person out of prison upon certificate of his conformity to the jurisdiction ecclesiastical. FNB 63.
- Excommununicato capiendo, a writ to the sheriff for the apprehending him who stands obstinately excommunicated for forty days, and imprisoning him without bail or mainprize. 5 Eliz 1 c 23.
- Excommunicato recipiendo, a writ whereby persons excommunicate being for their obstinancy committed to prison and unlawfully delivered thence, before they have given caution to obey the authority of the church, are commanded to be sought for and imprisoned again.
- Ex gravi querda, a writ that lies for him to whom lands in a city or borough are devised, and which the heir of the devisor has taken possession of.
- Exigent, a writ that lies were neither the defendant nor any property can be found, and commands the sheriff to proclaim him five times, in order that he may be outlawed.
- Exoneratione sectae, a writ that lies for the king's ward to be disturned of all suits during his minority.
- Expensis militum levandis, a writ commanding the sheriff to levy the allowance for knights in parliament.
- Expensis militum non levandis, a writ prohibiting the sheriff from levying such allowance upon those that held in ancient demesne.
- Extent, a writ to the sheriff for the valuing of lands and tenements.

== F ==
- False judgment, writ of, lies where a false judgment is given in a court not of record.
- Fieri facias, a judicial writ that lay within a year and a day to levy the judgment of defendant's goods.

== G ==
- Grand distress, a writ which lies in two cases: either where defendant has been attached and does not appear, or where he has once appeared and after makes default.

== H ==
- Habeas corpus. "This is the most celebrated writ in the English law", and is of several kinds, viz.:
  - Ad subjiciendum, to relieve from wrong imprisonment.
  - Ad faciendum, to remove a cause into a superior court.
  - Ad respondendum, to remove a defendant who is in custody in a lower court to answer to a cause of action in a higher court.
  - Ad deliberandum, to remove a prisoner into the county where he is to be tried.
  - Ad satisfaciendum lies after judgment.
  - Ad testificandum, to bring a prisoner into court to testify.
- Habere facias visum, a writ commanding a view of the lands in question.
- Habere facias seisinam, a writ of execution commanding the sheriff to give the plaintiff possession of a freehold. Where the interest is less than the freehold the writ is known as habere facias possessionem.
- Homine replegiando, a writ to bail a man out of prison.

== I ==
- Identitate nominis, a writ that lies for him who is committed to prison for another man in the same name.
- Ingressu, a writ of entry, "whereby a man seeks entry into lands or tenements; it lies in many cases and hath many several forms".
- Inhibition, a writ to forbid a judge from further proceeding in a cause before him.
- Injunction, a prohibitory writ restraing a person from doing a thing which appears to be against equity and good conscience. 3 Bac Abr 172.
- Writ of inquiry, a judicial writ to the sheriff upon a judgment by default, commanding him to summon a jury to inquire what damages plaintiff has sustained.
- Intrusion de gard, a writ that lies where the infant within age entered into his lands and held his lord out.

== J ==
- Juris utrum, a writ that lies for the incumbent of a church whose predecessor has alienated his lands.
- Justicies is a writ directed to the sheriff to do justice in a plea of trespass vi et armis in the county court. It is in the nature of a commission.

== L ==
- Latitat, a writ whereby all men in personal actions are called originally in the King's Bench.
- Levari facias, to the sheriff to levy money of the lands of him who has forfeited his recognizance.
- Levari facias residuum, a writ for levying the remnant of a debt in part satisfied before.
- Libertatibus allocandis, a writ lying for a burgess of any city, who, contrary to the liberties of the city, is impleaded before the king's justices to have his privilege allowed. FNB 229.
- Licentia surgendi, "the writ whereby the tenant essoined de malo lecti obtains liberty to rise". (Essoin signifies the excuse for him that is summoned or sought for, and essoin de malo lecti is the excuse that the man is sick a bed, and he had to sue out the writ of licentia surgendis in order to get it up again.)

== M ==
- Mandamus, "an high prerogative writ of a most extensive remedial nature, and may be issued in some cases where the injured party has also another more tedious mode of redress". 3 Bl Com 100.
- Manucaptio, a writ that lies for a man, who, being taken on suspicion of felony, and offering sufficient bail, cannot be admitted thereto by the sheriff or other having power to let to mainprize. FNB 149.
- Maritagio amisso per defaltam, a writ for the tenant in frank-marriage to recover lands, etc., whereof he is deforced by another. ("Frank marriage is a tenure in tail special, whereby the donees shall have the land to them and the heirs of their bodies, and shall do fealty to the donor till the fourth degree".)
- Media acquitando, a judicial writ to distrain a lord for acquiring a mean lord for a rent which he formerly acknowledged in court not to belong to him.
- Mittimus, a writ by which records are transferred from one court to another.
- Monstraus de droit, a writ out of chancery for the subject to be restored to lands, which he shows to be his right, though by office found to be in the possession of another lately dead.
- Monstraverunt, a writ which lies for the tenants in ancient demesne, being distrained for any toll or imposition contrary to their liberty.

== N ==
- Nativo habendo, a writ to the sheriff for a lord whose villein run from him, for apprehending and restoring him to his lord again. (Villain or villein were of two sorts in England - one termed villien in gross who was immediately bound to the person of his lord and his heirs).
- Ne admittas, a writ that lies for the plaintiff, who fears the bishop will admit the clerk of the defendant during the suit between them.
- Ne exeat
- Non molestando, a writ which lies for him who molested contrary to the king's protection.
- Non ponendis in assisis et juratis, a writ for freeing persons from serving on assizes or juries by reason of their old age: but by 4 & 5 W c 24 "no such writ shall be granted unless upon oath made that the suggestions on which it is granted are true". (All justices of the peace were obliged to be present at all assizes, to which were issued commissions of oyer and terminer and gaol delivery.)

== O ==
- Officiaris non faciendis, a writ to the magistrates of a corporation not to make such a man an officer until inquiry be made of his manners.
- Onerando pro rata portionis, a writ that lies for a joint tenant or tenant in common, who is distrained for more rent than his portion.

== P ==
- Parco fracto, a writ that lies against him who violently breaks a pound and takes out beasts which were legally impounded for trespass done.
- Ponendis in assis, a writ to show what persons the sheriff ought to impanel upon assizes and juries and what not, as also what number.
- Pontibus reparandis, a writ directed to the sheriff requiring him to charge one or more to repair a bridge to whom it belongs.
- Post disseisin, a writ for him that having recovered land by paecipe quod reddat upon default of rendition is again disseised by the former disseisor.
- Precipe, a writ commanding one to do the thing required or show cause why he has not done it.
- Procendo ad judicium, a writ which lies when the judges of any court delay the party, and will not give judgment in a case when they ought to. Wood's Inst 570. (In 1870, the Albany Law Journal said this was worth preserving in practice at that time.)
- Prohibition, a prerogative writ to the judges of an inferior court commanding them to cease prosecuting a matter before them. 3 Bl Comm 112.
- Prohibitio de vasto, a judicial writ to a tenant prohibiting him from making waste upon the land in controversy during the suit.

== Q ==
- Quae plura, a writ which lay after an inquisition by the escheator for lands imagined not to have been found.
- Quare impedit, a writ against him that disturbs one in the right of his advowson, by presenting a clerk thereto when the church is void. (Advowson is the right of presentation to a church).
- Quare non admisit, a writ against a bishop refusing to admit a clerk that has recovered in a plea of advowson. (Clerk means clericus sacerdotis, a parish clerk or inferior assistant to the parochial priest).
- Quid juris clamat, a judicial writ issuing out of the record of a fine.
- Quod ei deforceat, a writ that lies for the tenant having lost his lands by default.
- Quod permittal, a writ that lies for one who is disseised of his common of pasture.
- Quo jure, a writ for him in whose land another claims common of pasture, to show by what title the common is claimed.
- Quominus
- Quo warranto, a writ of right for the king against him who claims or usurps an office.

== R ==
- Ravishment de gard, a writ against him who took from a guardian the body of his ward.
- Rebellion
- Recto de dote, a writ of right of dower.
- Rege inconsulto, a writ issued from the king to the judges not to proceed in a cause which may prejudice the king until he is advised.
- Regio assenser, a writ whereby the king gives his royal assent to the election of a bishop.
- Reparatione facienda, a writ for one tenant in common to compel his co-tenants to unite in repairs.
- Retorno habendo, a writ which lies for him who has proved his distress lawful to have the cattle returned to him.

== S ==
- Scire facias, a judicial writ whereby the sheriff is commanded to summon the defendant in a judgment to show cause why execution should not issue.
- Scutagio habendo, a writ that lay for the king or other lord to the tenant, to serve by himself or send a substitute.
- Secta ad curiam, a writ that lies against him who refuses to perform his suit either in the county or court baron.
- Securitate pacis, a writ that lies for one who is threatened with death or danger. It is taken out of chancery and directed to the sheriff.
- Seisin a habenda, a writ which lies for the delivery of seisin to the lord of his lands, after the king in right of his prerogative has had the year, day and waste. ("Year, day and waste" is part of the king's prerogative whereby he challenges the profits of their lands, etc., for a year and a day that are attainted of pity, treason or felony; and not only so, but in the end may waste the tenements, destroy the houses, root up the woods, garden and pasture, and plough up the meadows. Staundf Perog c 16.)
- Significavit, a writ de excommunicate capiendo issuing out of chancery upon a certificate of the ordinary, that a man stands obstinately excommunicated for forty days, for laying him up in prison without bail or mainprize until he submit himself to the authority of the church. So called, because significavit is an emphatical word in the writ. ("Ordinary" is the judge who has exempt and immediate jurisdiction in causes ecclesiastical. 2 Inst 19. "Mainprize" is taking a man into friendly custody upon his giving security for his forthcoming.)
- Si non omnes, a writ of association whereby if all in a commission cannot meet, it is allowed that two or more may finish the business.
- Subpoena, a writ by which all persons are called into chancery where the common law fails and has made no provision. It may be either:
  - Ad testificandum
  - Duces tecum
- Summons, a writ to the sheriff to warn one to appear at a day.
- Supersedeas, a writ whereby a person is directed to forbear doing something therein mentioned, or, if done already, to revoke the act. 4 Bac Ab 668.
- Supplicavit, a writ issuing out of chancery for taking the surety of the peace against a man.

== T ==
- Terris liberandis, a writ that lies for a man who is attainted to take a fine for his imprisonment and restore him his lands again. ("Attainted" is one convicted of treason or felony whereby his children cannot inherit.)
- Thelonium, a writ for a burgess to sue him from a toll by reason of the privilege of his city or town.
- Tort, a writ whereby a cause pending in a court baron is removed to the county court.

== U ==
- Utlagato capiendo, a writ for the taking of an outlawed person in one county, who afterward flies into another.

== V ==
- Vasto, a writ that lies for the heir against the tenant for making waste. FNB 55.
- Venditione exponas, a writ judicial, directed to the under-sheriff, commanding him to sell goods which he had seized for satisfying a judgment.
- Venire facias
- Ventre inspiciendo, a writ to search a woman that says she is with child, and thereby withholds lands from the next kin. By which writ the sheriff is commanded that, in the presence of twelve men and as many women, he cause examination to be made, whether she is with child or not, and if with child, then about what time it will be born, and that he certify the same to the justices of the assize or at Westminster, under his seal and the seals of two of the men present. Cro Eliz 506.
- Vi laica removenda, a writ which lies where two persons contend for a church, and one of them enters by force, and he that is held out shall have this writ directed to the sheriff that he remove the force.

== W ==
- Warrantia chartae, a writ that lies where a man is enfoeffed of lands with warranty, and then he is sued or impleaded. FNB 134.
- Warrantia custodiae, a writ judicial, and lay for him who was challenged, to be a ward for another, in respect to lands said to be holden in knight's service.
- Warrantia dici, a writ lying where a man, having a day assigned to appear personally in court, but in the mean time employed in the king's service, it commands the justices that they neither take nor record him in default that day.
- Writ of waste, to punish the offence after it is committed, partly founded on the common law and partly on the Statute of Gloucester. 3 Bl Com 227.
