= Quia timet =

Action to restrain threatened wrongful acts

Quia timet (Latin for 'because he fears'; pronounced [/ˈkwiːə ˈtɪmɛt/ or /ˈkwiə ˈtɪmᵻt/]), is a common law injunction to restrain wrongful acts which are threatened or imminent but have not yet commenced. The 1884 English legal case of Fletcher v. Bealey [28 Ch.D. 688 at p. 698] stated the necessary conditions for the equity courts to grant an injunction in such cases:

1. proof of imminent danger;
2. proof that the threatened injury will be practically irreparable; and
3. proof that whenever the injurious circumstances ensue, it will be impossible to protect plaintiff's interests, if relief is denied.

== Brevia anticipantia ==
Quia timet remedies were writs at common law. According to Lord Coke, "there be six writs of law that may be maintained quia timet, before any molestation, distress, or impleading; as. 1. A man may have his writ or mesne, before he be distrained. 2. A warrantia chartae, before he be imploded. 3. A monstraverunt, before any distress or vexation. 4. An audita querela, before any execution sued. 5. A curia claudenda before any default of inclosure. 6. A ne injustice vexes, before any distress or molestation. And those are called brevia anticipantia, writs of prevention."

== Quia timet injunctions ==
Quia timet injunctions refer to a type of injunction in English law obtained where a wrong is anticipated. Quia timet literally means "because he fears".

According to Graigola Merthyr Co Ltd v Swansea Corpn to obtain a quia timet injunction there must be an immediate threat to do something. Moffat's Trusts Law states that a quia timet injunction can both prohibit something or mandate something to occur.
