= Serjeant-at-Arms of the Sri Lankan Parliament =

Sri Lanka Serjeant at Arms of Parliament
- Incumbent; Kushan Sampath Jayaratne since 2024
- Parliament of Sri Lanka
- Reports to: Secretary General of Parliament
- Appointer: Secretary General of Parliament
- Formation: 1948; 78 years ago
- First holder: M. Ismail, MBE
- Deputy: Deputy Serjeant at Arms
- Website: Department of the Serjeant-at-arms

The Serjeant-at-Arms of the Sri Lankan Parliament is a parliamentary official responsible for order in the Parliament of Sri Lanka. The office was established in 1948 on the model of the Serjeant-at-Arms of the House of Commons and traditionally included responsibility for security. The role is both ceremonial and functional as the holder is a career officer who heads the Department of the Serjeant-at-arms.

== Appointment ==
The Serjeant-at-Arms is appointed by the Secretary General of Parliament with the approval of the Speaker of Parliament, it is the third most senior position in the Parliament Secretariat after the posts of Secretary General of Parliament (formally Clerk of Parliament) and Deputy Secretary General of Parliament (formally Assistant Clerk). Traditionally, the appointment and retirement of the Serjeant-at-Arms is formally announced in the Parliament with a vote of appreciation of service delivered to the retiring Serjeant-at-Arms on the floor of the house.

The general practice is the Deputy Serjeant-at-Arms will succeed the retiring Serjeant-at-Arms having served as Acting Serjeant-at-Arms until the appointment is confirmed. The Assistant Serjeant-at-Arms would succeed the Deputy Serjeant-at-Arms. Entry qualifications to the appointment as Assistant Serjeant-at-Arms would open to applicants who are Sri Lankan citizen aged between 28 and 40 year, graduate with a degree and minimum eight years experience in the armed forces (regular) or police service of or above the rank of Captain or Assistant Superintendent of Police. Selection is through interview.

== Official duties ==
The Serjeant-at-Arms heads the Department of the Serjeant-at-Arms which is the second oldest department in with a Deputy Serjeant-at-Arms and the Assistant Serjeant-at-Arms. He is responsible for maintaining order and security within the Parliament. As such Serjeant-at-Arms administrates security of the parliament complex; coordinating with the Parliament Police Division and controlling admission of visitors and supervision of galleries. He is the only officer authorized to carry a weapon (ceremonial sword) inside the parliamentary chamber and is empowered to execute orders given by the chair to suspend a member of parliament temporarily or to remove the relevant member from the chamber for disobeying or disregarding the authority of the chair or for deliberately interrupting the proceedings of parliament repeatedly or violating parliamentary standing orders. He is empowered to accompany any witness, accused or any other person to the bar of the house when summoned. On order of the Speaker he may take any person into custody, without a warrant, within the Parliament for indecent behaviour, illegal entry or causes disturbances and keep him in custody until parliament decides if punishment should be meted out under the Parliament (Powers & Privileges) Act and the Standing Orders. He has the power to request any member to leave the chamber if the said member is not dressed in approved attire.

When maintaining order within the chamber, Serjeant-at-Arms may call on the Parliament Police Division to assist. Police officers may only enter the chamber on the request of the Serjeant-at-Arms and would not carry arms and enter with their insignia removed.

== Ceremonial duties ==
=== Mace ===
Serjeant-at-Arms is responsible for carrying the Mace into and out of the chamber for the Speaker of Parliament and serves as custodian of the mace.

=== Ceremonial events ===
Serjeant-at-Arms is in charge of arranging ceremonial events in parliament such as state functions, visits of foreign heads of state and government, lying in state.

== Uniform ==
At the formation of the post, the Serjeant-at-Arms adopted the white tropical dress uniform of the colonial service with a white pith helmet, shoulder mail and sword. By the 1970s the Serjeant-at-Arms had adopted dark blue uniform in the style of an Army officer's (of the rank of Major) No. 2 Dress uniform with a cross belt and shoulder mail. This evolved into two sets of uniforms worn by the Serjeant-at-Arms, the Deputy Serjeant-at-Arms and the Assistant Serjeant-at-Arms. From the early 2000s to 2020, the ceremonial uniform was a dark blue uniform in the style of a General Officer's No. 1 Dress uniform (but with different gorget patchs and shoulder-boards). A cap is worn, medals and a sword with a steel scabbard. Since the 2020s, this has changed to a single-breasted black jacket four buttons, matching trousers, white shirt, blue tie, peaked cap, and black leather shoes, while carrying naval style sword with a steel scabbard and naval style gold rings on the cuffs with the ensigns of the mace. Ex-service personal, wear their medals and qualification badges. During the normal sitting days of the House, they would wear a white uniform with medal ribbons.

== Lists of Serjeant-at-Arms ==
- M. Ismail, MBE - 1947 to 1961
- J.R. de Silva – 1961 to 1970
- Ronnie Abeysinghe – 1970 to 1996
- Wijaya Palliyaguruge – 1996 to 2006
- Anil Parakrama Samarasekera - 2006 to 2018
- Narendra Fernando - 2018 to 2024
- Kushan Sampath Jayaratne - 2024 to present

== See also ==
- Serjeant-at-Arms
