= Statute of Gloucester 1278 =

Act of the Parliament of England

Statuta Gloucestr'
- Act of Parliament
- Parliament of England
- Long title: None
- Citation: 6 Edw. 1

Dates
- Royal assent: 1278
- Commencement: 8 July 1278 (Note: Start of session.)
- Repealed: England and Wales: 24 October 1883; Northern Ireland: 23 May 1950

Other legislation
- Repealed by: Statute Law Revision Act 1863; Civil Procedure Acts Repeal Act 1879; Statute Law (Ireland) Revision Act 1872; Statute Law Revision and Civil Procedure Act 1883; Statute Law Revision Act 1950

Status: Repealed

Text of statute as originally enacted

The Statute of Gloucester (Latin: Statuta Gloucestr') (6 Edw. 1) was a piece of legislation enacted in the Parliament of England during the reign of Edward I. The statute, proclaimed at Gloucester in August 1278, was crucial to the development of English law. The Statute of Gloucester and the ensuing legal hearings were a means by which Edward I tried to recover regal authority that had been alienated during the reign of his father, King Henry III (1207–1272), who had been made a virtual tool of the baronial party, led by Simon de Montfort. Edward I recognised the need for the legal "reform" and considered Parliament as a means of buying popular support by encouraging loyal subjects to petition the King against his own barons and ministers.

Chapters
Part preceding c. 1	N/A	Repealed for England and Wales by Statute Law Revision Act 1863 (26 & 27 Vict. c. 125) and for Ireland by Statute Law (Ireland) Revision Act 1872 (35 & 36 Vict. c. 98)
c. 1	Several Actions wherein Damages shall be recovered.	Repealed by Civil Procedure Acts Repeal Act 1879 (42 & 43 Vict. c. 59) and for England and Wales by Statute Law Revision and Civil Procedure Act 1883 (46 & 47 Vict. c. 49) and for Northern Ireland by Statute Law Revision Act 1950 (14 Geo. 6. c. 6)
c. 2	In what Case Nonage of the Plaintiff shall not stay an Enquest.	Repealed by Statute Law Revision and Civil Procedure Act 1883 (46 & 47 Vict. c. 49)
c. 3	An Alienation of Land by the Tenant by the Curtesy with Warranty shall be void.	Repealed for England and Wales by Statute Law Revision Act 1863 (26 & 27 Vict. c. 125) and for Ireland by Statute Law (Ireland) Revision Act 1872 (35 & 36 Vict. c. 98)
c. 4	In what Casse Ceffavit is maintainable against a Tenant in Fee-farm.	Repealed for England and Wales by Statute Law Revision Act 1863 (26 & 27 Vict. c. 125) and for Ireland by Statute Law (Ireland) Revision Act 1872 (35 & 36 Vict. c. 98)
c. 5	Several Tenants against whom an Action of Waste is maintainable.	Repealed by Civil Procedure Acts Repeal Act 1879 (42 & 43 Vict. c. 59)
c. 6	Where dives Heirs shall have one Assise of Mortdauncestor.	Repealed for England and Wales by Statute Law Revision Act 1863 (26 & 27 Vict. c. 125) and for Ireland by Statute Law (Ireland) Revision Act 1872 (35 & 36 Vict. c. 98)
c. 7	A Writ of Entry is casu proviso, upon a Woman's Alienation of Dower.	Repealed for England and Wales by Statute Law Revision Act 1863 (26 & 27 Vict. c. 125) and for Ireland by Statute Law (Ireland) Revision Act 1872 (35 & 36 Vict. c. 98)
c. 8	No Suit for Goods in the King's Courts under Forty Shillings. Attorneys may be made where an Appeal lieth not. The Defendant being essoined shall bring in his Warrant.	Repealed by Civil Procedure Acts Repeal Act 1879 (42 & 43 Vict. c. 59)
c. 9	One Person killing another in his own Defence, or by Misfortune. An Appeal of Murther.	Repealed for England and Wales by Statute Law Revision Act 1863 (26 & 27 Vict. c. 125) and for Ireland by Statute Law (Ireland) Revision Act 1872 (35 & 36 Vict. c. 98)
c. 10	The Husband and Wife being impleaded, shall not vouch [fourch] by Essoin.	Repealed for England and Wales by Statute Law Revision Act 1863 (26 & 27 Vict. c. 125) and for Ireland by Statute Law (Ireland) Revision Act 1872 (35 & 36 Vict. c. 98)
c. 11	A feigned Recovery against him in the Reversion, to make the Termor loss his Term.	Repealed for England and Wales by Statute Law Revision Act 1863 (26 & 27 Vict. c. 125) and for Ireland by Statute Law (Ireland) Revision Act 1872 (35 & 36 Vict. c. 98)
c. 12	One impleaded in London voucheth Foreign Warranty.	Repealed for England and Wales by Statute Law Revision Act 1863 (26 & 27 Vict. c. 125) and for Ireland by Statute Law (Ireland) Revision Act 1872 (35 & 36 Vict. c. 98)
c. 13	No Waste shall be made hanging a Suit for the Land.	Repealed for England and Wales by Statute Law Revision Act 1863 (26 & 27 Vict. c. 125) and for Ireland by Statute Law (Ireland) Revision Act 1872 (35 & 36 Vict. c. 98)
c. 14	A Citizen of London shall recover in an Assise Damages with the Land.	Repealed for England and Wales by Statute Law Revision Act 1863 (26 & 27 Vict. c. 125) and for Ireland by Statute Law (Ireland) Revision Act 1872 (35 & 36 Vict. c. 98)

The statute is the origin of the common law doctrine of waste, which allows successors with future interests in a piece of property to prevent current tenants, who do not hold the land in fee simple, from making substantial changes to the property that would decrease its value.

The statute provided for several important legal amendments, including a modification of novel disseisin, one of the most popular forms of action for the recovery of land which had been seized illegally. It challenged baronial rights through a revival of the system of general eyres (royal justices to go on tour throughout the land) and through a significant increase in the number of pleas of quo warranto (literally, "By what warrant?") to be heard by such eyres. In such proceedings, individual barons and franchise holders were expected either to show the King's judges proper legal title by which they possessed their rights to private jurisdictions or to lose such rights.

It is the first statute recorded in a Statute Roll.

== Subsequent developments ==
The first chapter of the act is sometimes referred to as the Franchise Act 1278.

The act was extended to Ireland by Poynings' Law 1495 (10 Hen. 7. c. 22 (I)).

Chapters 1 of the act except from "And whereas before Time" to "recover Damages", and chapters 5 and 8 of the act, were repealed by section 2 of, and part I of the schedule to, the Civil Procedure Acts Repeal Act 1879 (42 & 43 Vict. c. 59).

The part preceding chapter 1 and chapters 2–4, 5, 9–15 of the act were repealed for England and Wales by section 1 of, and the schedule to, the Statute Law Revision Act 1863 (26 & 27 Vict. c. 125), which came into force on 28 July 1863.

The part preceding chapter 1 and chapters 2–4, 5, 9–15 of the act were repealed for Ireland by section 1 of, and the schedule to, the Statute Law (Ireland) Revision Act 1872 (35 & 36 Vict. c. 98), which came into force on 10 August 1872.

The residue of chapter 1 of the act was repealed for England and Wales by section 4 of the Statute Law Revision and Civil Procedure Act 1883 (46 & 47 Vict. c. 49).

The whole of chapter 1 of the act, so far as unrepealed, was repealed for Northern Ireland by section 1(1) of, and the first schedule to, the Statute Law Revision Act 1950 (14 Geo. 6. c. 6).

== See also ==
- Casu proviso

== Bibliography ==
- Merrill, Thomas W.; Smith, Henry E. (2017). Property: Principles and Policies. University Casebook Series (3rd ed.). St. Paul: Foundation Press. ISBN 978-1-62810-102-7.
