= Timet =

Timet or variation, may refer to:

- timidity, fear
- time-t, a common name for a value or variable representing time
- time_t, a C computer language datatype for storing time values
- Titanium Metals Corporation (TIMET)
- Timet (song) 1970 tune by Dizzy Gillespie off the album Portrait of Jenny

== See also ==
- Quia timet
- Time (disambiguation)
