= High, middle and low justice =

Legal hierarchy in Western feudalism

High, middle and low justices is a distinction drawn to describe descending degrees of judicial power to administer justice by the maximal punishment the holders could inflict upon their subjects and other dependents dating back to Western feudalism. The scale of punishment generally matched the scale of spectacle (e.g. a public hanging was high justice). In France, Paul Friedland argues, "The degree of spectacle [was] originally the basis for a distinction between high and low justice", with an intermediate level of "middle justice", added around the end of the fourteenth century, to describe limited or modest spectatorship.

Low justice referred to day-to-day civil actions, including voluntary justice, minor pleas, and petty offences generally settled by fines or light corporal punishment. It was held by many lesser authorities, including many lords of the manor, who sat in justice over the serfs, unfree tenants, and freeholders on their land. Middle justice would involve full civil and criminal jurisdiction, except for capital crimes, and notably excluded the right to pass the death penalty, torture and severe corporal punishment. These powers were reserved to authorities holding high justice or the ius gladii ("right of the sword").

== Pyramid of feudal justice ==
Although the terms high and low suggest a strict hierarchy, a case could often be brought in one of several courts, with the principle of "prevention" (in the etymological sense of Latin praevenire, "to come before") granting jurisdiction to the court in which the case was first filed or otherwise brought.

As a rule, each court administered justice in general as long as the matter was not reserved for a higher court or by virtue of some privilegium fori (e.g., of clerics to be judged in canon courts by other clergy, sometimes under ecclesiastical law, the origin of the English common-law concept—benefit of clergy). Criminal cases were generally not separate from civil actions and other types of justice--a big exception being canon law. In addition to civil and criminal trials, the notion of justice also included voluntary justice, which is really the official recording of deeds such as marital agreements, wills, grants, etc.

A right of appeal was not automatically available, and even when explicitly established, it was not always to a court of the superior political level or a higher degree of the trio. Feudal justice was a labyrinth of specific customs and rules in nearly endless variation, not governed by any clear legal logic, and subject to significant historical evolution in time. However, customary law tended by nature to be quite conservative. As in all spheres of life, feudal society did not see uniformity in law as either possible or necessarily desirable, each town and region had its customs and ways of doing things, and resented attempts to interfere with them.

While the right of justice is held by many "unique" courts, relatively strong states made it a pillar of their absolutist (re)emergence to establish numerous courts to administer justice in their name in different territorial circumscriptions, such as the royal (high) sheriffs in England, or to impose an appeal (at least unifying the law as such) to a royal court, as to the various French provincial parlements.

== High justice ==
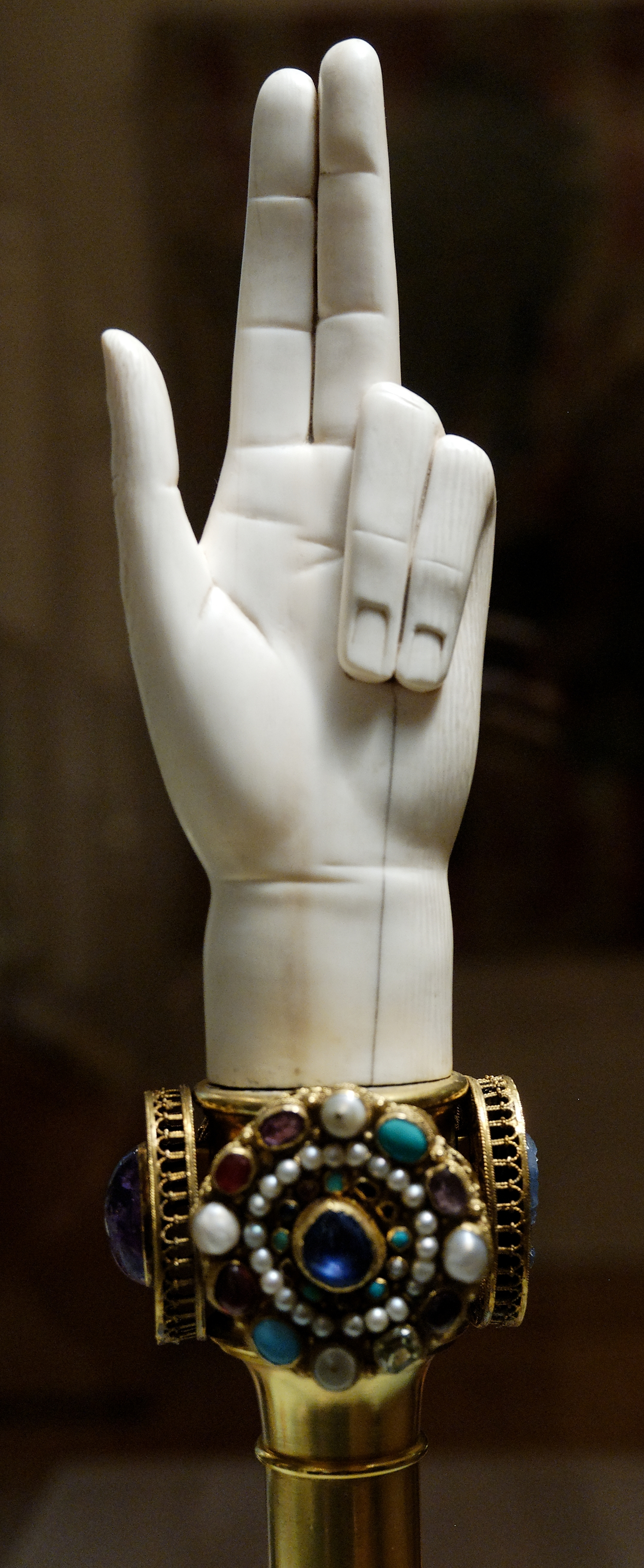
Hand of justice displayed at the Louvre, Paris

High justice was also known in Latin as ius gladii ("right of the sword") and in German as Blutgerichtsbarkeit ("blood jurisdiction"), Blutgericht ("blood justice" or "blood-court"), or sometimes Halsgericht ("neck justice") or peinliches Gericht ("agonizing justice"). It was the highest penal authority and included capital punishment in territories that permit it. It was held by a sovereign and commonly symbolized by regalia including the sword of justice and hand of justice. In the early Holy Roman Empire, high justice was reserved to the king. In the 13th century, it was transferred to the king's vassals along with their fiefs.

The first codification of capital punishment was the Halsgerichtsordnung passed by Maximilian I in 1499, followed in 1507 by the Constitutio Criminalis Bambergensis. Both codes formed the basis of the Constitutio Criminalis Carolina (CCC), passed in 1532 under Charles V. In the Habsburg monarchy, all regional codes were superseded by the Constitutio Criminalis Theresiana in 1768.

The Blutbanner ("blood banner") or Blutfahne ("blood flag") was a solid red flag. It was presented to feudal lords as a symbol of their power of high jurisdiction (Blutgerichtsbarkeit) together with the heraldic banner of the fief. Some feudal houses adopted a red field symbolic of the blood banner into their coat of arms, the so-called Regalienfeld. The Talschaft (forest canton) of Schwyz used the blood banner as a war flag from c. 1240, and was later incorporated into the flag of Schwyz and the flag of Switzerland.

Often it is proudly displayed, in the form of relevant status symbols. Thus permanent gallows are often erected in prominent public places; the very word for them in French, potence, is derived from the Latin "potentia" meaning "power".

High justice is held by all states and the highest vassals in the European type of feudal society, but may also be acquired by other authorities as part of a high degree of legal autonomy, such as certain cities; which in time often obtained other high privileges originally reserved for high nobility and sometimes high clergy. Other such privileges could include a seat in a diet or a similar feudal representative assembly, before the third estate as such even aspired to such "parliamentary" representation, or the right to mint coins. These privileges indicated that such a political subdivision, referred to as a liberty and sometimes extending beyond a population center similarly to a polis in classical antiquity, was an entity of standing "equal" to that of the neighboring or surrounding entity or entities whose territory remained under the jurisdiction of a feudal lord or ecclesiastical official.

Not every Vogt held high justice. Up to the 18th century, for example, the blood court of much of what is now the canton of Zürich lay with Kyburg, even in the territory ruled by the counts of Greifensee. The self-administration of the blood court was an important factor of Imperial immediacy.

== See also ==
- Landgericht (medieval)
- Private jurisdiction
- Zwing und Bann
