= Judiciary of Luxembourg =

The judiciary of Luxembourg comprises a number of courts.

== Overview and jurisdictions ==
As a consequence of the separation of powers, cases against individual persons and cases involving the state are treated in two separate jurisdictions. In Luxembourg, a further distinction is generally made between the private, social, administrative and military jurisdictions:

- Constitutional Court
- Private jurisdiction
  - Justices of the Peace (justices de paix)
    - Peace Tribunal (Tribunal de paix)
    - Employment Tribunal (Tribunal de travail)
    - Police Tribunal (Tribunal de police)
  - District Tribunals (Tribunal d'arrondissement)
    - Civil, commercial and criminal chambers
    - Court of youth and guardianship
  - Superior Court of Justice (Cour supérieure de justice)
    - Court of Appeal (Cour d'appel)
    - Court of Cassation (Cour de cassation)
- Social jurisdiction
  - Arbitration Council for Social Security
  - Superior Council for Social Security
- Administrative jurisdiction
  - Administrative Tribunal
  - Administrative Court
- Military jurisdiction
  - War Council
  - Court of Appeal
  - High Military Court

=== Constitutional Court ===
The Constitutional Court is responsible for questions over a law's compatibility with the constitution, regardless of jurisdiction.
The Court is composed as follows:

- President of the Superior Court of Justice
- President of the Administrative Court
- Two counsellors of the Court of Cassation
- Five magistrates appointed by the Grand Duke

=== Private jurisdiction ===
==== Justices of the Peace ====
There are 3 Justices of the Peace, one in the city of Luxembourg, one in Esch-Alzette and one in Diekirch. Each is composed of several judges of the peace, and includes the Peace Tribunal, the Police Tribunal (criminal matters), and the Employment Tribunal (employment matters).

The Peace Tribunal is the first instance for civil and commercial disputes over amounts under 10,000 Euros, with some exceptions. It also deals with cases which have a value greater than 10,000€, in the following instances:

- Rent payment disputes
- Garnishment of wages or pensions
- Demands for alimony, except when linked with a divorce or legal separation
- Matters dealing with insolvency

The following are not in its jurisdiction, even if the amount in dispute is under 10,000 Euros:

- Divorce cases
- Cases over parentage
- Adoption
- Bankruptcy applications

The Police Tribunal, under a Police Judge (juge de police), deals with infractions.

The Employment Tribunal is composed of the president (a Judge of the Peace) and two assessors, nominated by the trade bodies of the employees and employers respectively. Judgements of the Peace Tribunal and Police Tribunal may be appealed to the District Tribunals; judgements of the Employment Tribunal are appealed to the Court of Appeals.

==== District Tribunals ====
There are 2 District Tribunals, one for the judicial district of Luxembourg and one for the judicial district of Diekirch. while the District Tribunal is the first instance for matters with a disputed amount above that, the District Tribunal (in its correctional and criminal chambers) deals with delicts and crimes. Judgements of the District Tribunals are appealed to the Court of Appeal.

==== Superior Court of Justice ====
The Superior Court, which comprises the Court of Appeal and Court of Cassation, is based in Luxembourg and has jurisdiction over the whole country....

=== Social jurisdiction ===
- Arbitration Council for Social Security
- Superior Council for Social Security

Appeals are made to the Court of Cassation.

=== Administrative jurisdiction ===
- Administrative Tribunal
- Administrative Court

Through a law passed in 1996, with effect from 1997, the Council of State's responsibility for administrative law was taken away and made an autonomous jurisdiction. Since then, the Council of State has only retained its role of giving advice to the Chamber of Deputies.

== Functioning ==
=== Principles ===
Everyone has the right to bring their dispute to a court and receive a decision. Those who do not have the funds to afford a lawyer, may apply for Assistance judiciaire and have a lawyer provided by the state.

The principle of "double degré de juridiction" applies, which means that every matter may be abjudicated twice, both in facts as well as in law. Therefore, there are always two instances in Luxembourgish courts. However, for disputes over small amounts, the first instance may also be the last instance, with no avenue of appealing, except by making an application to the Court of Cassation: up to 2,000 euros before the Peace Tribunal, up to 1,250€ before the Employment Tribunal, before the District Tribunal in cases where it has exclusive competence, and before the Arbitration Council for Social Security. The Court of Cassation is not a third instance, as it does not judge the facts, only the correct application of the law.

Judges are to remain impartial and independent, and the organisation of the courts must provide the necessary guarantees that so that there can be no doubt about the impartiality and independence (for example, a judge from the first instance may not sit in the second instance; judges may not adjudicate a case if they know the parties, may not exercise certain additional occupations or incompatible functions, and may not ask the executive about the interpretation of a law).

Court sessions and announcements of verdicts must be public. This principle is to provide a transparent justice system, and a further guarantee of impartiality. In exceptional cases, a court session may take place behind closed doors, as for example with witness statements by minors.

Cases must receive a verdict within a reasonable delay. Luxembourg has in the past been disciplined by the European Court of Human Rights in Strasbourg under Article 6 of European Convention of Human Rights, and has been called on to provide a court system where judges, as well as parties, cannot make a case drag on for years.

=== Procedure ===
Court sessions are presided over by a judge, who may sit alone or collegially. One judge sits in the Justices of the Peace, 3 in the District Tribunals, 3 in the Court of Appeals and in the social and administrative jurisdictions, and 5 in the Court of Cassation and Constitutional Court. When multiple judges sit, verdicts are always taken by an absolute majority.

The prosecution is represented in the courts by the Parquet and the Parquet géneral at the Superior Court.

Judges are aided by court clerks (greffiers). During judicial recesses from 16 July to 15 September, and two weeks for Easter, the court service continues work, but in reduced form, with few sittings.
