= Ronnie Abeysinghe =

3rd Serjeant-at-Arms of the Sri Lankan Parliament
- In office 1970–1996
- Preceded by: A. J. R. De Silva
- Succeeded by: Wijaya Palliyaguruge

Personal details
- Born: Ronald; 26 July 1936 Sri Lanka
- Died: 11 February 2002 (aged 65) Colombo, Sri Lanka
- Spouse: Iromi
- Children: Asika, Devinka, Amal

Ronald Abeysinghe (also called "Ronnie") (26 July 1936 – 11 February 2002) was the former Serjeant-at-Arms of the Sri Lankan Parliament from 1970 to 1996.

== Early life ==
Abeysinghe was born on 26 July 1936 in Teldeniya, close to Kandy. His father Robert Abeysinghe was a government doctor while his mother, Meraya Goonatillake, hailed from Panadura. He had his education initially at St. John's College, Panadura and then at Prince of Wales College, Moratuwa. He was the eldest of nine siblings.

== Career ==
Abeysinghe joined Parliament in 1961 when he was appointed Assistant Serjeant-at-Arms. In 1970, he was promoted when he was appointed as Serjeant-at-Arms. He remained in the position for 26 years, a record for the most senior Serjeant-at-Arms of Parliament in the Commonwealth. He served under Prime Minister Sirimavo Bandaranaike, President J. R. Jayewardene, Ranasinghe Premadasa, Dingiri Banda Wijetunga, and Chandrika Kumaratunge in his service in the parliament. He was mainly responsible for all ceremonial occasions as the master of ceremonies in Parliament, preservation of order, custody of the Mace, security, admission of visitors, allocation of accommodation within the House and supervision of the galleries. The Serjeant-at-Arms is responsible for the overall security of the Parliamentary Estate. He was in charge of the security of the members of the parliament when a JVP member attacked the house killing one MP and injuring Minister Lalith Athulathmudali.

== Other activities ==
Abeysinghe was the President of Automobile Association of Ceylon from 1992 to 1997, and president of the Sri Lanka Powerlifting Association. He was also a former Junior Mister Ceylon and a finalist in the Mister Ceylon contest.

== Family ==
In 1966, he married Iromi, a teacher of S. Thomas' College, Mount Lavinia. He was a father of three children. He died on 11 February 2002.
