= Jurisdiction =

Authority granted to a legal body or political leader to deal with legal matters

Jurisdiction (from Latin juris 'law' and dictio 'speech' or 'declaration') is the legal term for the legal authority held by a legal entity to enact justice. Jurisdiction is rarely claimed to be complete: rather it is limited for example by geography, subject matter, or other factor. It is only within the scope (inside the limits) of such jurisdiction that, for example, the parties to a dispute have standing to bring the matter (a legal question) before a judge, who has power (or 'jurisdiction') to decide it authoritatively.

A "jurisdiction" can also be understood as a category name for any separate polity legally constituted as such — for any government with legislative and other legal power over a particular territory, whether that area is a nation state or some smaller region. Thus, Australia, Arizona, North Yorkshire and New York City are each "a jurisdiction". In federations like the United States, jurisdiction in this polity sense applies at multiple levels (e.g., local, state, and national/federal).

Jurisdiction draws its substance from international law, conflict of laws, constitutional law, and is often thought to include the powers of the executive and legislative branches of government to pursue policies and allocate resources so as to best serve the needs of society.

== International dimension ==
Generally, international laws and treaties provide agreements which nations agree to be bound to. Such agreements are not always established or maintained. Extraterritorial jurisdiction is exercised through three principles outlined in the UN Charter. These are equality of states, territorial sovereignty and non-intervention. This raises questions of when can many states prescribe or enforce jurisdiction. The Lotus case establishes two key rules to the prescription and enforcement of jurisdiction. The case outlines that jurisdiction is territorial and that a state may not exercise its jurisdiction in the territory of another state unless there is a rule that permits this. On that same note, states enjoy a wide measure of discretion to prescribe jurisdiction over persons, property and acts within their own territory unless there was a rule that prohibits this.

=== Political issue ===
Supranational organizations provide mechanisms whereby disputes between nations may be resolved through arbitration or mediation. When a country is recognized as de jure, it is an acknowledgment by the other de jure nations that the country has sovereignty and the right to exist.

However, it is often at the discretion of each nation whether to co-operate or participate. If a nation does agree to participate in activities of the supranational bodies and accept decisions, the nation is giving up its sovereign authority and thereby allocating power to these bodies.

Insofar as these bodies or nominated individuals may resolve disputes through judicial or quasi-judicial means, or promote treaty obligations in the nature of laws, the power ceded to these bodies cumulatively represents its own jurisdiction. But no matter how powerful each body may appear to be, the extent to which any of their judgments may be enforced, or proposed treaties and conventions may become, or remain, effective within the territorial boundaries of each nation is a political matter under the sovereign control of each nation.

=== International and municipal ===
The fact that international organizations, courts and tribunals have been created raises the difficult question of how to coordinate their activities with those of national courts. If the two sets of bodies do not have concurrent jurisdiction but, as in the case of the International Criminal Court (ICC), the relationship is expressly based on the principle of complementarity, i.e., the international court is subsidiary or complementary to national courts, the difficulty is avoided. But if the jurisdiction claimed is concurrent or, as in the case of International Criminal Tribunal for the former Yugoslavia (ICTY), the international tribunal is to prevail over national courts, the problems are more difficult to resolve politically.

The idea of universal jurisdiction is fundamental to the operation of global organizations such as the United Nations and the International Court of Justice (ICJ), which jointly assert the benefit of maintaining legal entities with jurisdiction over a wide range of matters of significance to nations (the ICJ should not be confused with the ICC and this version of "universal jurisdiction" is not the same as that enacted in the War Crimes Law (Belgium), which is an assertion of extraterritorial jurisdiction that will fail to gain implementation in any other state under the standard provisions of public policy). Under Article 34 Statute of the ICJ only nations may be parties in cases before the Court and, under Article 36, the jurisdiction comprises all cases which the parties refer to it and all matters specially provided for in the Charter of the United Nations or in treaties and conventions in force. But, to invoke the jurisdiction in any given case, all the parties have to accept the prospective judgment as binding. This reduces the risk of wasting the Court's time.

Despite the safeguards built into the constitutions of most of these organizations, courts and tribunals, the concept of universal jurisdiction is controversial among those nations which prefer unilateral to multilateral solutions through the use of executive or military authority, sometimes described as realpolitik-based diplomacy.

Within other international contexts, there are intergovernmental organizations such as the World Trade Organization (WTO) that have socially and economically significant dispute resolution functions but, again, even though their jurisdiction may be invoked to hear the cases, the power to enforce their decisions is at the will of the nations affected, save that the WTO is permitted to allow retaliatory action by successful nations against those nations found to be in breach of international trade law. At a regional level, groups of nations can create political and legal bodies with sometimes complicated patchworks of overlapping provisions detailing the jurisdictional relationships between the member states and providing for some degree of harmonization between their national legislative and judicial functions, for example, the European Union and African Union both have the potential to become federated nations although the political barriers to such unification in the face of entrenched nationalism will be very difficult to overcome. Each such group may form transnational institutions with declared legislative or judicial powers. For example, in Europe, the European Court of Justice has been given jurisdiction as the ultimate appellate court to the member states on issues of European law. This jurisdiction is entrenched, and its authority could only be denied by a member nation if that member nation asserts its sovereignty and withdraws from the union.

==== Law ====
The standard treaties and conventions leave the issue of implementation to each nation, i.e. there is no general rule in international law that treaties have direct effect in municipal law, but some nations, by virtue of their membership of supranational bodies, allow the direct incorporation of rights or enact legislation to honor their international commitments. Hence, citizens in those nations can invoke the jurisdiction of local courts to enforce rights granted under international law wherever there is incorporation. If there is no direct effect or legislation, there are two theories to justify the courts incorporating international into municipal law:

- Monism

This theory characterizes international and municipal law as a single legal system with municipal law subordinate to international law. Hence, in the Netherlands, all treaties and the orders of international organizations are effective without any action being required to convert international into municipal law. This has an interesting consequence because treaties that limit or extend the powers of the Dutch government are automatically considered a part of their constitutional law, for example, the European Convention for the Protection of Human Rights and Fundamental Freedoms and the International Covenant on Civil and Political Rights. In nations adopting this theory, the local courts automatically accept jurisdiction to adjudicate on lawsuits relying on international law principles.

- Dualism

This theory regards international and municipal law as separate systems so that the municipal courts can only apply international law either when it has been incorporated into municipal law or when the courts incorporate international law on their own motion. In the United Kingdom, for example, a treaty is not effective until it has been incorporated, at which time it becomes enforceable in the courts by any private citizen, where appropriate, even against the UK Government. Otherwise the courts have a discretion to apply international law where it does not conflict with statute or the common law. The constitutional principle of parliamentary supremacy permits the legislature to enact any law inconsistent with any international treaty obligations even though the government is a signatory to those treaties.

In the United States, the Supremacy Clause of the United States Constitution makes all treaties that have been ratified under the authority of the United States and customary international law to be a part of the "Supreme Law of the Land" (along with the Constitution itself and acts of Congress passed pursuant to it) (U.S. Const. art. VI Cl. 2) As such, the law of the land is binding on the federal government as well as on state and local governments. According to the Supreme Court of the United States, the treaty power authorizes Congress to legislate under the Necessary and Proper Clause in areas beyond those specifically conferred on Congress (Missouri v. Holland, 252 U.S. 416 (1920)).

=== International ===
This concerns the relationships both between courts in different jurisdictions, and between courts within the same jurisdiction. The usual legal doctrine under which questions of jurisdiction are decided is termed forum non conveniens.

To deal with the issue of forum shopping, nations are urged to adopt more positive rules on conflict of laws. The Hague Conference and other international bodies have made recommendations on jurisdictional matters, but litigants with the encouragement of lawyers on a contingent fee continue to shop for forums.

==== Jurisdictional principles ====
Under international law there are different principles that are recognized to establish a state's ability to exercise criminal jurisdiction when it comes to a person. There is no hierarchy when it comes to any of the principles. States must therefore work together to solve issues of who may exercise their jurisdiction when it comes to issues of multiple principles being allowed. The principles are Territorial Principle, Nationality Principle, Passive Personality Principle, Protective Principle, Universality Principle.

Territorial principle: This principle states that the State where the crime has been committed may exercise jurisdiction. This is one of the most straightforward and least controversial of the principles. This is also the only principle that is territorial in nature; all other forms are extraterritorial.

Nationality principle (also known as the Active Personality Principle): This principle is based around a person's nationality and allows States to exercise jurisdiction when it comes to their nationality, both within and outside the State's territory. Seeing as the territoriality principle already gives the State the right to exercise jurisdiction, this principle is primarily used as a justification for prosecuting crimes committed abroad by a States nationals. There is a growing trend to allow States to also apply this principle to permanent residents abroad as well (for example: Denmark Criminal Code (2005), sec 7; Finland Criminal Code (2015), sec 6; Iceland Criminal Code (2014), art 5; Latvia Criminal Code (2013), sec 4; Netherlands Criminal Code (2019), art 7; Norway Criminal Code (2005), sec 12; Swedish Criminal Code (1999), sec 2; Lithuania Criminal Code (2015), art 5.

Passive Personality Principle: This principle is similar to the Nationality Principle, except you are exercising jurisdiction against a foreign national that has committed a criminal act against its own national. The idea is that a State has a duty to protect its nationals and therefore if someone harms their nationals that State has the right to prosecute the accused.

Protective principle: This principle allows States to exercise jurisdiction when it comes to foreign nationals for acts committed outside their territory that have or are intended to have a prejudicial impact upon the State. It is especially used when it comes to matters of national security.

Universality principle: This is the broadest of all the principles. The basis is that a State has the right, sometimes even the obligation, to exercise jurisdiction when it comes to the most serious violations of international criminal law; for example genocide, crimes against humanity, extrajudicial executions, war crimes, torture, and forced disappearances. This principle also goes further than the other principles as there is attached to it the obligation to either prosecute the accused or extradite them to a State that will, known as aut dedere aut judicare.

=== Supranational ===
At a supranational level, countries have adopted a range of treaty and convention obligations to relate the right of individual litigants to invoke the jurisdiction of national courts and to enforce the judgments obtained. For example, the member nations of the EEC signed the Brussels Convention in 1968 and, subject to amendments as new nations joined, it represents the default law for all twenty-seven Member States of what is now termed the European Union on the relationships between the courts in the different countries. In addition, the Lugano Convention (1988) binds the European Union and the European Free Trade Association.

In effect from 1 March 2002, all the European Union member states except Denmark accepted Council Regulation (EC) 44/2001, which makes major changes to the Brussels Convention and is directly effective in the member nations. Council Regulation (EC) 44/2001 now also applies as between the rest of the EU Member States and Denmark due to an agreement reached between the European Community and Denmark. In some legal areas, at least, the reciprocal enforcement of foreign judgments is now more straightforward. At a national level, the traditional rules still determine jurisdiction over persons who are not domiciled or habitually resident in the European Union or the Lugano area.

=== National ===
Many nations are subdivided into states or provinces (i.e. a subnational "state"). In a federation—as can be found in Australia, Brazil, India, Mexico, and the United States—such subunits will exercise jurisdiction through the court systems as defined by the executives and legislatures.

When the jurisdictions of government entities overlap one another—for example between a state and the federation to which it belongs—their jurisdiction is a shared or concurrent jurisdiction. Otherwise, one government entity will have exclusive jurisdiction over the shared area. When jurisdiction is concurrent, one government entity may have supreme jurisdiction over the other entity if their laws conflict. If the executive or legislative powers within the jurisdiction are not restricted, or have only limited restrictions, these government branches have plenary power such as a national policing power. Otherwise, an enabling act grants only limited or enumerated powers.

Child custody cases in the U.S. are a prime example of jurisdictional dilemmas caused by different states under a federal alignment. When parents and children are in different states, there is the possibility of different state court orders over-ruling each other. The U.S. solved this problem by adopting the Uniform Child Custody Jurisdiction and Enforcement Act. The act established criteria for determining which state has primary jurisdiction, which allows courts to defer the hearing of a case if an appropriate administrative agency determines so.

== United States ==
The primary distinctions between areas of jurisdiction are codified at the federal level. In the United States' common law system, jurisdiction is conceptually divided between jurisdiction over the subject matter of a case and personal jurisdiction over the parties to the case.

A court whose subject matter jurisdiction is limited to certain types of controversies (for example, suits in admiralty or suits where the monetary amount sought is less than a specified sum) is sometimes referred to as a court of special jurisdiction or court of limited jurisdiction.

In U.S. federal courts, courts must consider subject matter jurisdiction sua sponte and therefore recognize their own lack of jurisdiction even if neither party has raised the matter.

=== General and limited jurisdiction ===
A court whose subject matter is not limited to certain types of controversy is referred to as a court of general jurisdiction. In the U.S. states, each state has courts of general jurisdiction; most states also have some courts of limited jurisdiction. Federal courts (those operated by the federal government) are all courts of limited jurisdiction. Federal jurisdiction is divided into federal question jurisdiction and diversity jurisdiction. The United States district courts may hear only cases arising under federal law and treaties, cases involving ambassadors, admiralty cases, controversies between states or between a state and citizens of another state, lawsuits involving citizens of different states, and against foreign states and citizens.

Certain courts, particularly the United States Supreme Court and most state supreme courts, have discretionary jurisdiction, meaning that they can choose which cases to hear from among all the cases presented on appeal. Such courts generally only choose to hear cases that would settle important and controversial points of law. Though these courts have discretion to deny cases they otherwise could adjudicate, no court has the discretion to hear a case that falls outside of its subject matter jurisdiction.

=== Original and appellate jurisdiction ===
It is also necessary to distinguish between original jurisdiction and appellate jurisdiction. A court of original jurisdiction has the power to hear cases as they are first initiated by a plaintiff, while a court of appellate jurisdiction may only hear an action after the court of original jurisdiction (or a lower appellate court) has heard the matter. For example, in United States federal courts, the United States district courts have original jurisdiction over a number of different matters (as mentioned above), and the United States court of appeals have appellate jurisdiction over matters appealed from the district courts. The U.S. Supreme Court, in turn, has appellate jurisdiction (of a discretionary nature) over the Courts of Appeals, as well as the state supreme courts, by means of writ of certiorari.

However, in a special class of cases, the U.S. Supreme Court has the power to exercise original jurisdiction. Under 28 U.S.C. § 1251, the Supreme court has original and exclusive jurisdiction over controversies between two or more states, and original (but non-exclusive) jurisdiction over cases involving officials of foreign states, controversies between the federal government and a state, actions by a state against the citizens of another state or foreign country.

=== Example of jurisdiction ===
As a practical example of court jurisdiction, as of 2013 Utah has five types of courts, each for different legal matters and different physical territories. 108 judges oversee Justice Courts, which handle traffic and parking citations, misdemeanor crimes, and most small claims cases. Seventy-one judges preside over District Courts, which deal with civil cases exceeding small claims limits, probate law, felony criminal cases, divorce and child custody cases, some small claims, and appeals from Justice Courts. Twenty-eight judges handle Juvenile Court, which oversees most people under 18 years old who are accused of a crime, as well as cases of alleged child abuse or neglect; serious crimes committed by 16 or 17 year old persons may be referred to the District Courts. Seven judges in the Appeals Court hear most criminal appeals from District Courts, all appeals from juvenile court and all domestic/divorce cases from District Court, as well as some cases transferred to them by the Supreme Court. The Supreme Court seats five judges who hear appeals on first-degree felonies (the most serious) including capital crimes, as well as all civil cases from District Court (excepting divorce/domestic cases). The Supreme Court also oversees cases involving interpretation of the state Constitution, election matters, judicial conduct, and alleged misconduct by lawyers. This example shows how matters arising in the same physical territory might be seen in different courts. A minor traffic infraction originating in Orem, Utah is handled by the Orem Justice Court. However, a second-degree felony arrest and a first-degree felony arrest in Orem would be under the jurisdiction of the District Court in Provo, Utah. If both the minor traffic offense and the felony arrests resulted in guilty verdicts, the traffic conviction could be appealed to the District Court in Provo, while the second-degree felony appeal would be heard by the Appeals Court in Salt Lake City and the first-degree felony appeal would be heard by the Supreme Court. Similarly for civil matters, a small claims case arising in Orem would probably be heard in the Orem Justice Court, while a divorce filed by an Orem resident would be heard by the District Court in Provo. The above examples apply only to cases of Utah state law; any case under Federal jurisdiction would be handled by a different court system. All Federal cases arising in Utah are under the jurisdiction of the United States District Court for the District of Utah, headquartered in Salt Lake City, Utah, and would be heard in one of three Federal courthouses.

== Australia ==
In Australia, unless a matter is brought before the courts in a way amounting to an abuse of process, a court recognizing its jurisdiction is obliged to exercise it. But as Australia is a federal country, no court is vested with an unrestricted jurisdiction. Therefore, the rules of jurisdiction are used to determine the ambit of those restrictions upon the courts.

=== State and federal jurisdiction ===
This idea of restrictions on jurisdiction is well illustrated by the difference in competence between federal and state courts.

Federal courts are the High Court of Australia (HCA), the Federal Court of Australia (FCA), the Family Court of Australia, and other subsidiary courts. Federal courts exercise federal jurisdiction — the judicial powers granted to the judicial branch of the federal government by the Constitution of Australia. The extent of that jurisdiction is then outlined and delimited in both the Constitution and legislation enacted pursuant to it by the federal parliament. For example, section 73(ii) of the Constitution empowers the High Court to hear appeals from the supreme court of any state, and from other courts exercising federal jurisdiction. Likewise, section 39B(1A)(c) of the Judiciary Act 1903 (Cth) empowers the Federal Court of Australia to hear any matter arising under laws enacted by the federal parliament.

Similarly, the jurisdiction of state courts is created by the states’ constitutions and is further delineated by legislation passed by their respective parliaments. In the Constitution of Queensland 2001 (QLD), it is written at s58(1) that the Supreme Court of the state has all jurisdiction necessary for the administration of justice in Queensland. That is the extent of its jurisdiction.

In New South Wales, the courts’ jurisdiction is not mentioned in the constitution. Instead, the state’s legislature is empowered to make laws for the peace, welfare, and good governance of New South Wales. Amongst these laws, it is stated in section 23 of the Supreme Court Act 1970 (NSW) that the Supreme Court shall have all jurisdiction necessary for the administration of justice in NSW.

In Victoria, that same power is conferred by section 85(1) of its constitution.

In summary, the jurisdiction of the courts of each state extends (at a basic level) to matters occurring within their state. Meanwhile, the jurisdiction of the Federal Court of Australia is over matters arising under federal law. The jurisdiction of the High Court is to hear appeals from states’ Supreme Courts, the Federal Court, and over a unique set of matter-types (eg, federal electoral disputes) in the HCA's own "original jurisdiction" as prescribed in the Constitution and Judiciary Act. Insofar as it exercises its power to hear and determine an appeal on a matter of state law only, the HCA—despite being a federal court—may be said to be exercising state (eg, Victorian) jurisdiction, namely its own Victorian jurisdiction to determine disputes in Victoria or of Victorians—and further its own power as the ultimate court of appeal above any state supreme court (the appeal is heard in the Court's appellate jurisdiction) to finally determine what the Victorian law is.

=== Original and appellate jurisdiction ===
A layered or hierarchical understanding of levels of curial jurisdiction is useful to determine which questions a court may (seek to) answer in examining a matter based on the mechanism by which the matter came before it. Original jurisdiction permits courts to answer all questions of law and fact: this is jurisdiction possessed by a court because the matter is new, brought before a court for the first time — originally. (For practical reasons, courts hearing appeals from administrative bodies will also exercise original jurisdiction; this does not subvert the notion of jurisdiction — rather it points to the separateness of jurisdictions of the judicial decision maker versus (say) the executive ministerial decision maker.)

Appellate jurisdiction is corrective in nature. There, courts examine how lower courts' and earlier decision-makers answered questions of law, whether an error was made in that process, as well as whether and how that error ought to be rectified. Their job is to correct errors made in answering the said questions — essentially, to correct errors of law.

=== Cross-vesting scheme ===
The jurisdiction of Supreme Courts of states and territories may be vested in each other in special circumstances, and federal jurisdiction may likewise be vested in them. Technicalities aside, the scheme compels courts to transfer matters to another court if, in the interests of justice, the second court is a more appropriate place to litigate. In assessing the interests of justice in any particular matter, the court will have regard to the interests of the parties.

The mere existence of criteria to transfer matters over to different courts nonetheless means that parties have an interest in commencing proceedings in the most convenient jurisdiction to them. The advantage conferred onto first movers is not exclusive to the Australian federal court system, parties involved in international disputes will already be familiar with that concept. However, the threshold for intra-Australia transfer is notably lower than that pertaining to international transfer.

== Territorial meaning ==
The word "jurisdiction" is also used, especially in informal writing, to refer to a state or political subdivision generally, or to its government, rather than to its legal authority. This is especially useful for describing a variety of governments at a variety of levels — where one cannot simply for example refer to 'states', because one of those in the set is a national government. When one has a multi-level set of governments to describe, 'jurisdictions' is a useful plural (group) descriptor.

== Franchise jurisdiction ==
In the history of English common law, a jurisdiction could be held as a form of property (or more precisely an incorporeal hereditament) called a franchise. Traditional franchise jurisdictions of various powers were held by municipal corporations, religious houses, guilds, early universities, the Welsh Marches, and counties palatine. Types of franchise courts included courts baron, courts leet, merchant courts, and the stannary courts that dealt with disputes involving the tin miners of Cornwall. The original royal charters of the American colonies included broad grants of franchise jurisdiction along with other governmental powers to corporations or individuals, as did the charters for many other colonial companies such as the British East India Company and British South Africa Company. Analogous jurisdiction existed in medieval times on the European Continent. Over the course of the 19th and 20th centuries, franchise jurisdictions were largely eliminated. Several formerly important franchise courts were not officially abolished until Courts Act of 1971.

== See also ==
- Jurisdiction (area)
- Guantánamo Bay Naval Base
- Immunity from prosecution (international law)
- Labor unions in the United States – a different use of the word jurisdiction
- Law enforcement agency – a different use of the word jurisdiction
- Lawsuits against God
- Private jurisdiction
- Rasul v. Bush
- State immunity
- Universal jurisdiction
