= Serjeant-at-arms =

Officer appointed by a legislature to keep order

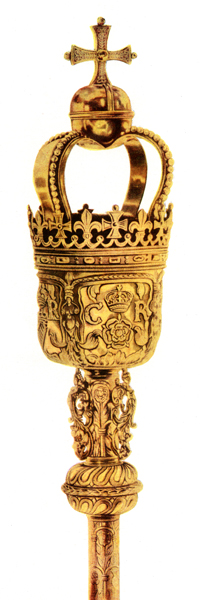
A ceremonial mace (English, 17th century) as carried by the monarch's sergeants-at-arms on state occasions.

A serjeant-at-arms or sergeant-at-arms (Note: "Sergeant" is a modern UK and North American variant spelling.) is an officer appointed by a deliberative body, usually a legislature, to keep order during its meetings. The word "serjeant" is derived from the Latin serviens, which means "servant".

In the Middle Ages, the serjeants-at-arms were bodies of armed men retained by the French and English monarchs: the ceremonial maces with which they are associated were originally a type of weapon. Serjeants-at-arms continue to serve a ceremonial role in the Royal Household of the United Kingdom; as such they represent the oldest royal bodyguard in England.

== Origins ==
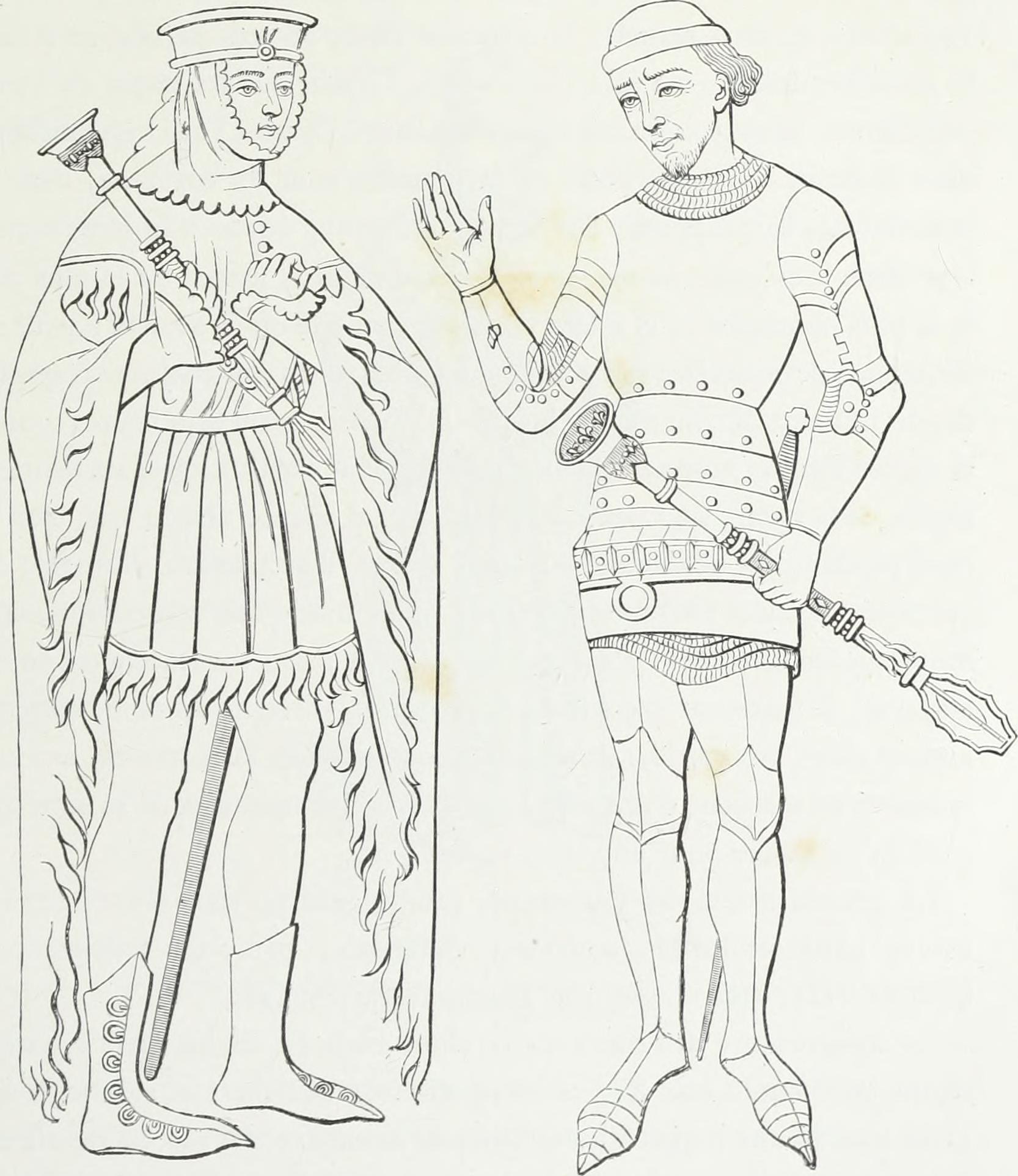
French serjeants-at-arms in courtly (left) and military (right) dress (from a 14th-century bas relief, Couvent Sainte-Catherine-du-Val-des-Écoliers, Paris).

The most familiar use of the term "sergeant" today is as a military rank. In the medieval period, the soldier sergeant was a man of what would now be thought of as the 'middle class', fulfilling a junior role to the knight in the medieval hierarchy. Sergeants could fight either as heavy to light cavalry, or as well-trained professional infantry, either spearmen or crossbowmen. Most notable medieval mercenaries fell into the 'sergeant' class, such as Flemish crossbowmen and spearmen, who were seen as reliable quality troops. The sergeant class were deemed to be 'worth half of a knight' in military value.

As 'knight' came to signify social (rather than military) rank, so 'serjeant' began to be used for a particular social class (below that of a knight but above that of a gentleman; though by the end of the 14th century 'esquire' had displaced 'serjeant' to describe this class of people). This usage survived in the Royal Household, where (for many centuries) serjeants had charge of several departments below-stairs. As late as the 17th century, there were (among others) a Serjeant of the Bakehouse, Serjeant of the Cellar, Serjeant of the Pastry, Serjeant of the Scullery and Serjeant of the Woodyard, each overseeing a staff of Yeomen, Grooms and Pages with (in some instances) a Gentleman serving as their deputy. (The usage has survived to this day in a few Household offices such as the Serjeant Surgeon and Serjeant of the Vestry).

The particular office of serjeant-at-arms originated in twelfth-century France, when King Philip II formed for himself a bodyguard of nobles and armed them with maces. The Sergens d'Armes had a courtly as well as a military character, and their maces served both as an insignia of office and as a practical weapon: at court they wore robes, in the field they wore armour; either way they carried their maces. They were powerful figures, answerable to no judicial authority but the King and the Constable of France. A hundred serjeants were retained by Philip of Valois, but after his death they were reduced to just six in number, before disappearing entirely in the second half of the 14th century.

The existence of an English corps of serjeants-at-arms is first recorded in the reign of Edward I, towards the end of the 13th century. It is from this body of men that the present-day serjeants-at-arms evolved.

== History of the office in England ==
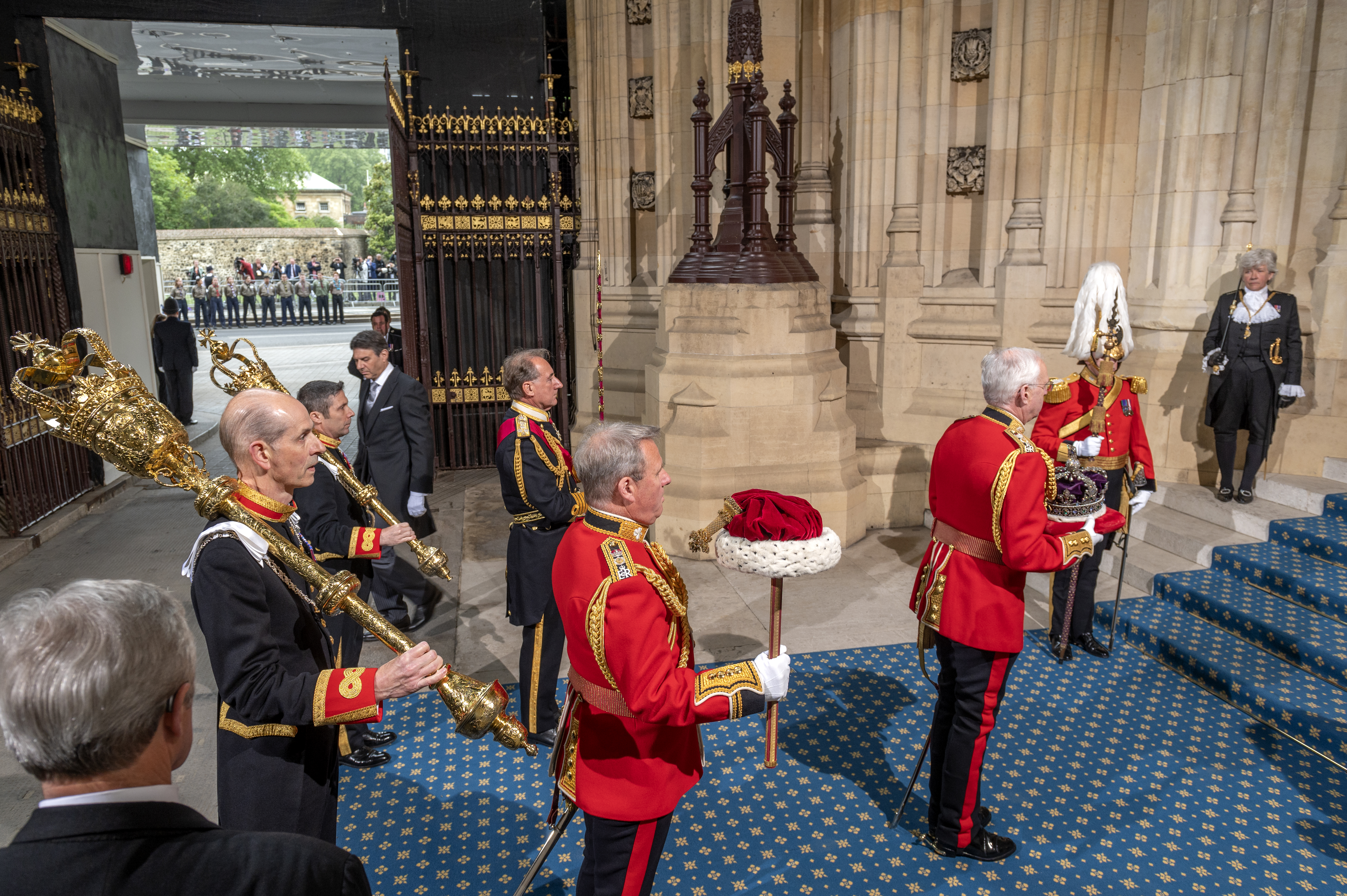
Two Serjeants-at-arms of the Royal Household escort the officers carrying the regalia into the Palace of Westminster for the State Opening of Parliament in 2022.

The earliest record of the Sergeants-at-Arms in England is found in 1278, when Edward I formed them into a twenty-strong Corps to serve as a close escort. The size of the corps grew over subsequent reigns: "by the statutes of noble Edward [III] were thirty serjeants of arms sufficiently armed and horsed, riding before his highness when he journeyed by the country for a gard de Corps du Roy [king's bodyguard]". Like their French counterparts they wore either robes or armour, as appropriate; they were required at times to be mounted, and at other times to attend on foot. The role of the serjeants was two-fold: as well directly defending the person of the king, they also had wide-ranging powers of arrest and sometimes served the sovereign in a police role (the abuse of this power during the reign of Richard II led to a number of serjeants being dismissed, and the corps, which had by then greatly expanded, was reduced again to thirty in 1399).

=== Duties ===
In 1417 the King's brother, Thomas of Lancaster, published a set of instructions for the kings of arms, heralds and serjeants-at arms (among whom there had been a dispute about their places in processions). He reiterated the purpose of the serjeants-at-arms, "which were principally founded and ordained for the conservation of the person of the King and his Lords", and also described their appearance: "the Serjeants at Arms in Service Royal ought to stand before the King in such fashion attired: that is to say his head bare and all his body armed to the feet with arms of a Knight riding, wearing a gold chain with a medal bearing all the King's Coats" and with a "Mace of silver in his right hand, and in his left hand a truncheon".

He declared that "as often as the King shall ride or go to the church on foot or on horseback, or in any army in field, town or other place or places where the King's honour ought to be maintained" the chief king of arms should go directly before the king (or the person carrying the sword before him) and the serjeants on either side ("that is on the right hand and on the left, before him that shall carry the sword") so as to defend the king and his lords from the "press of people" on either side. Also, on 'solemn feasts', the serjeants-at-arms were directed to walk "on the left and on the right hand of the Master of the Household (or High Steward or any other in his place) going before the meats and services of the King, to keep and defend the press of people".

The document also sets out the serjeants' not inconsiderable powers of arrest: "a Serjeant at Arms may apprehend or attach any subject of the King, or other whatsoever he be, remaining in the four seas of England or any part thereof, be it in any house, castle, or fort"; the only persons exempt from this power were the eldest son of the King and "the ladies his daughters". They received payment per arrest, depending on the rank of the person apprehended: ranging from 100 shillings of silver for an archbishop or duke, to one silver mark for a common person. A serjeant's arrest was 'of more high nature than any other can be'; they represented 'the valorous force of a King's errand in the execution of justice', and no-one arrested by a serjeant could then be bailed or released into another's custody. The serjeants-at-arms on occasion apprehended people under the authority of an officer of state (such as the Lord High Admiral, Lord High Constable or Lord High Chancellor). At tournaments and jousts they stood ready, under the authority of the Constable and Marshal, to arrest anyone transgressing the laws of Chivalry.

=== Later developments ===
The Black Book of the Household of King Edward IV envisages there being four serjeants in the king's entourage, "whereof two alway to be attending upon the King's person and chamber, and to avoid the press of people before where the King shall come". Under the Tudors the size of the corps was again increased; in 1492 they were summoned by King Henry VII to accompany him on a military venture in France. Elizabeth I maintained a body of twenty-five serjeants-at-arms; under her successor James I their number was reduced to sixteen.

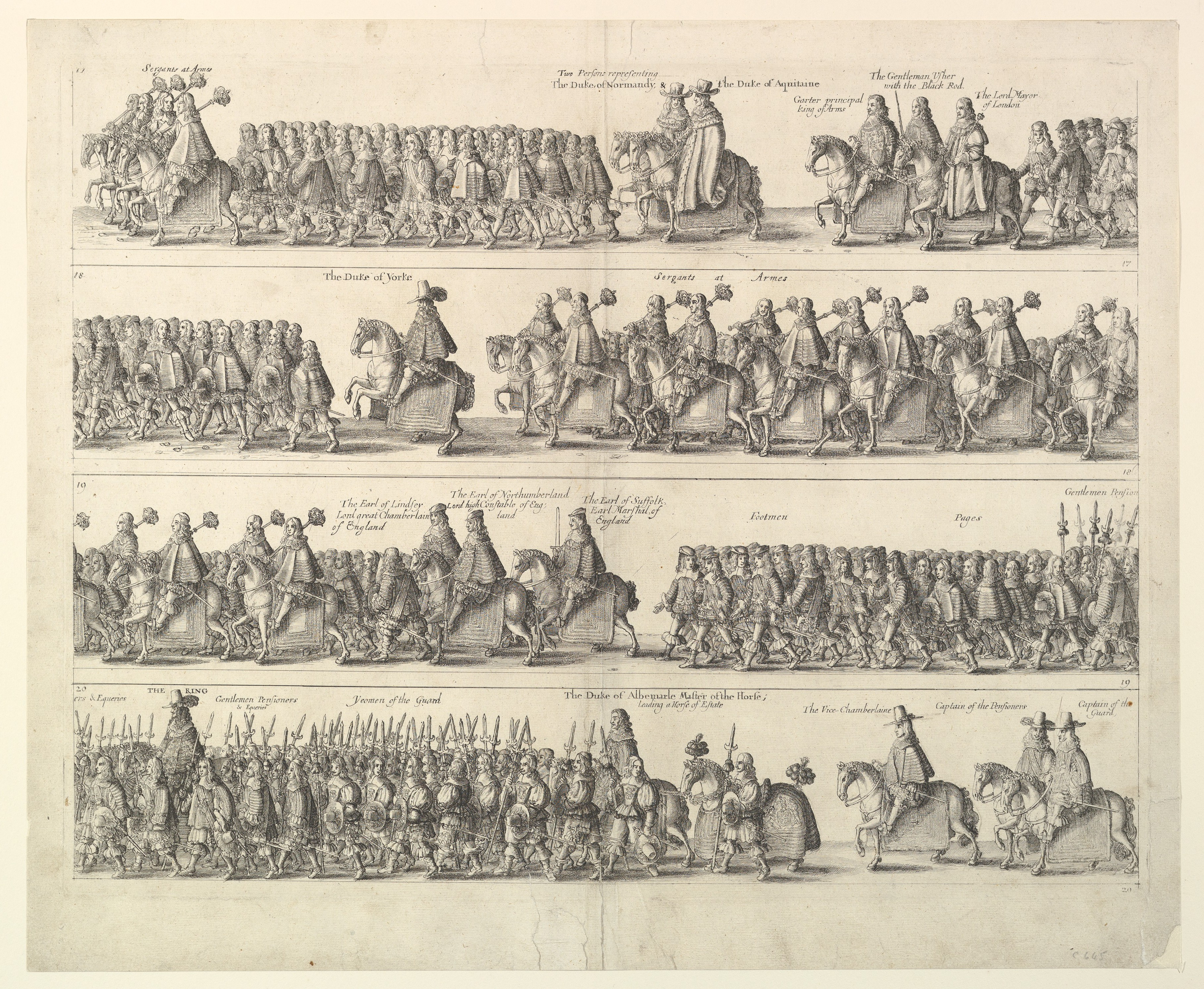
Sixteen Serjeants-at-Arms can be seen mounted on horses ahead of the King's entourage in Hollar's depiction of the Coronation Procession of Charles II.

Charles II likewise maintained a cohort of sixteen sergeants-at-arms: they waited on the monarch quarterly, four being on duty at any one time. They were required to "give their attendance every Sunday and Holy day and whensoever We shall go to Church", and it was declared that "two sergeants at arms shall attend Us in all progresses and attend whensoever the Sword of State is carried". When a new serjeant-at-arms was created a ceremony was held in the Presence Chamber: the new officer knelt before the king, who invested him first with a collar of esses and then with the mace, before declaring "Rise up, Serjeant at Arms, and Esquire for ever".

In 1685, following the coronation of James II, the number of serjeants was reduced to eight; this number was maintained in subsequent reigns up to and including that of Queen Victoria. They continued to wait quarterly, in pairs, attending in the Presence Chamber on Sundays and festival days. On rare occasions (most notably coronations) all eight would be on duty: they would customarily go ahead of the King in pairs, escorting those carrying the items of regalia. At the coronation banquet they escorted the Lord High Steward and other Lords who walked ahead of the dishes of hot meat as they were brought to the newly crowned King; and a pair of serjeants escorted the King's Champion at his entry into the hall.

In subsequent reigns their number was gradually reduced: to six under Edward VII, to four under George V, and three under Elizabeth II. At the coronation of Charles III two serjeants-at-arms walked in the procession ahead of the regalia: Paul Whybrew and Richard Thompson.

The original responsibilities of the sergeant-at-arms included "collecting loans and, impressing men and ships, serving on local administration and in all sorts of ways interfering with local administration and justice."

=== Parliamentary role ===
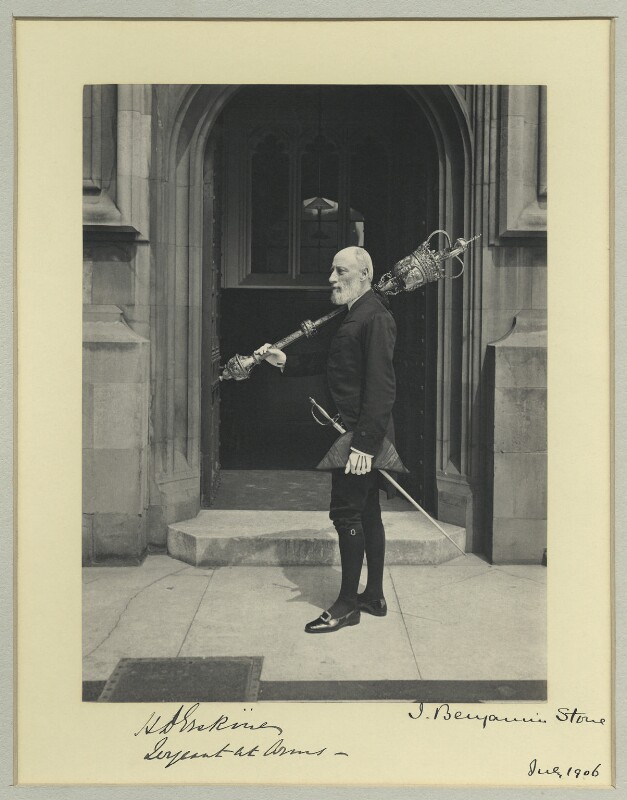
David Erskine, House of Commons Serjeant at Arms (photo by J. B. Stone, 1906).

From an early time, individual serjeants-at-arms of the Royal Household were attached to certain Great Officers of State. The Lord High Steward had a serjeant-at-arms, as did the Lord High Chancellor and the Lord High Treasurer. The Lord Chancellor is still attended by a serjeant-at-arms on ceremonial occasions (unless the monarch himself is present).

The Lord Chancellor was ex officio speaker of the House of Lords (an arrangement that pertained until 2006). His designated serjeant-at-arms had an authorized deputy who was "in constant attendance upon the Great Seal". The duty of the serjeant (or his deputy), "besides that of bearing the gilt mace before the Lord Chancellor, Lord Keeper or Lords Commissioners in going or returning from Court or Parliament", was (on behalf of the Court of Chancery) "to execute all warrants against persons who have stood out commissions of rebellion" and to take them into custody.

In 1415, the King appointed one of his serjeants-at-arms (Nicholas Maudit) to the House of Commons; the appointment was at the Commons' request, as recorded in the Letters Patent. (Note: "Grant at the supplication of the Commonalty of the realm in the present Parliament that the Kings Esquire, Nicholas Maudit, one of the King’s Serjeants at Arms shall be intendent at all Parliaments for the Commonalty coming to the Parliaments".) Since 1471, his successors as Serjeant at Arms have, more specifically, been instructed to attend upon the Speaker. The practice of the Commons themselves petitioning the king, for a particular individual to serve as their Serjeant, lapsed under Henry VIII; subsequently, individuals were appointed by the monarch: "to the place or office of one of our Serjeants at Arms in ordinary, to attend upon Our Royal person when there is no Parliament and at the time of every Parliament to attend upon the Speaker of the House of Commons". (Note: When Edward VII opened parliament in 1901 the Serjeant at Arms attended the king as Groom of the Robes, and the Deputy Serjeant carried the mace.) Up until 1962 it remained in all respects a royal appointment; since then, it has been the custom of the Crown "to undertake formal consultation with the House (and in practice to accept the recommendations of an appointment board)".

==== Disciplinary responsibilities ====
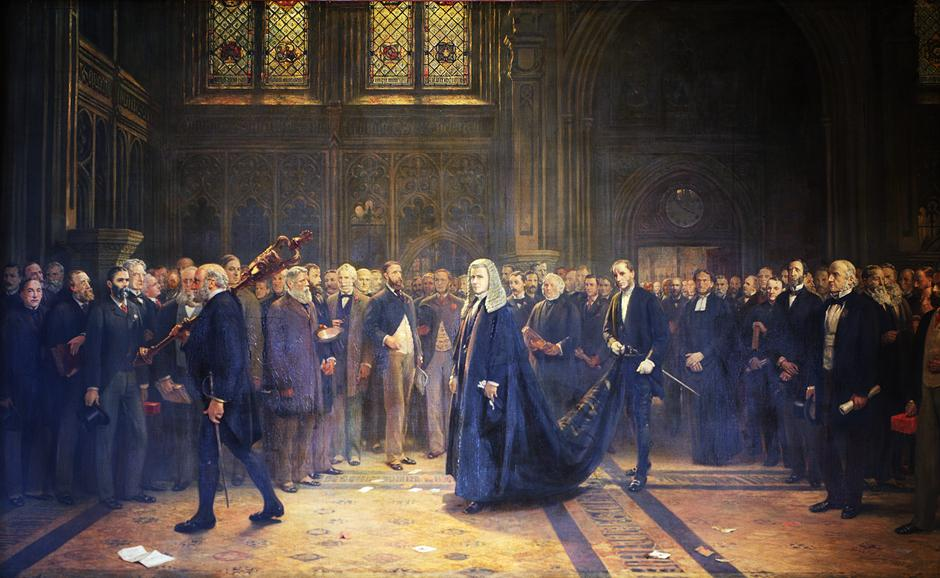
The Serjeant at Arms (Ralph Gosset, left) in 1884, leading the Speaker, Henry Brand, in procession.

Like the other serjeants-at-arms, the Serjeant at Arms of the House of Commons had a role that was practical as well as ceremonial: within the precincts of the House of Commons he kept order, and introduced messengers and others at the bar of the House. Further afield, he was empowered to summon individuals to the bar of the House, to place them in custody and commit them to a place of detention (if ordered by the House to do so). As demonstrated in the Ferrers Case of 1543, the Serjeant had wide-ranging powers of arrest, requiring no writ but only the "show of his Mace which was his warrant". In later centuries (the custom having been established that the mace should remain in the chamber while the House was sitting), the mechanism of a Speaker's Warrant was established, as an alternative to the mace, to provide the Serjeant with the authority required to take people into custody.

In the eighteenth century it was not unusual for the Serjeant at Arms to take absentee Members of Parliament into custody so as to enforce their attendance in the House of Commons, as duly elected representatives; this last took place in 1859 with the arrest of Fulke Greville, MP for Longford. MPs could also be committed into the custody of the Serjeant at Arms for unruly behaviour; the last MP to have been imprisoned (in the clock tower) for unruly behaviour was Charles Bradlaugh in 1880. (The last occasion on which a non-member was imprisoned by the Commons was also in 1880; while still theoretically lawful, it has been stated that "imprisonment is no longer a power upheld by the Commons" in the present day). Admonishment was another possible sanction: the last non-politician to be summoned to the bar by the Serjeant at Arms in order for them to be admonished was John Junor (editor of the Sunday Express) in 1957; he apologised to the House and no further action was taken. The last MP to be so summoned was Tam Dalyell in 1968. More recently, the Serjeant (or a deputy) has been employed to serve papers on individuals who have failed to respond to a summons to appear before a Select Committee of the House.

== Present day ==
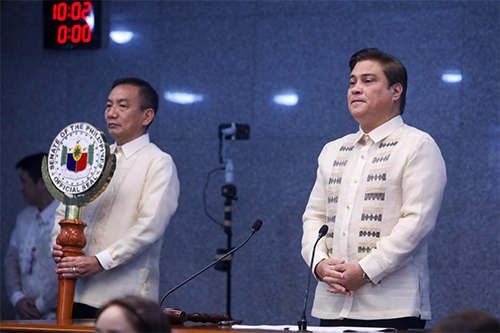
Senate Sergeant-at-Arms of the Senate of the Philippines (left).

The formal role of a sergeant-at-arms in modern legislative bodies is to keep order during meetings, and, if necessary, forcibly remove any members or guests who are overly rowdy or disruptive. (A sergeant-at-arms may thus be a retired soldier, police officer, or other official with experience in law enforcement and security.) They may also have a ceremonial and/or administrative role, and sometimes retain

=== Australia ===
The Australian House of Representatives operates under the Westminster parliamentary system. The serjeant-at-arms is a career officer of the Department of the House of Representatives. The ceremonial duties are as the custodian of the mace, the symbol of the authority of the Crown and the House, and as the messenger for formal messages from the House to the Senate. The serjeant has the authority to remove disorderly people, by force if necessary, from the House or the public or press galleries on the instructions of the speaker. The administrative duties of the serjeant include allocation of office accommodation, furniture and fittings for members' offices, coordination of car transport for members, mail and courier services for the House, security for the House and arrangements for school visits. Once a meeting has started in a House the serjeant will usually stand at the door to keep authority and make sure no one else comes in or out.

=== Bangladesh ===
The serjeant-at-arms is the senior official of the National Parliament (Jatiyo Sangshad) who is responsible for maintaining order during sessions and to maintain security and protocol at Parliament under the guidance of the speaker. Presently, Captain M M Naim Rahman (G), NGP, NCC, PSC, BN naval officer, is appointed as serjeant-at-arms.

=== Canada ===
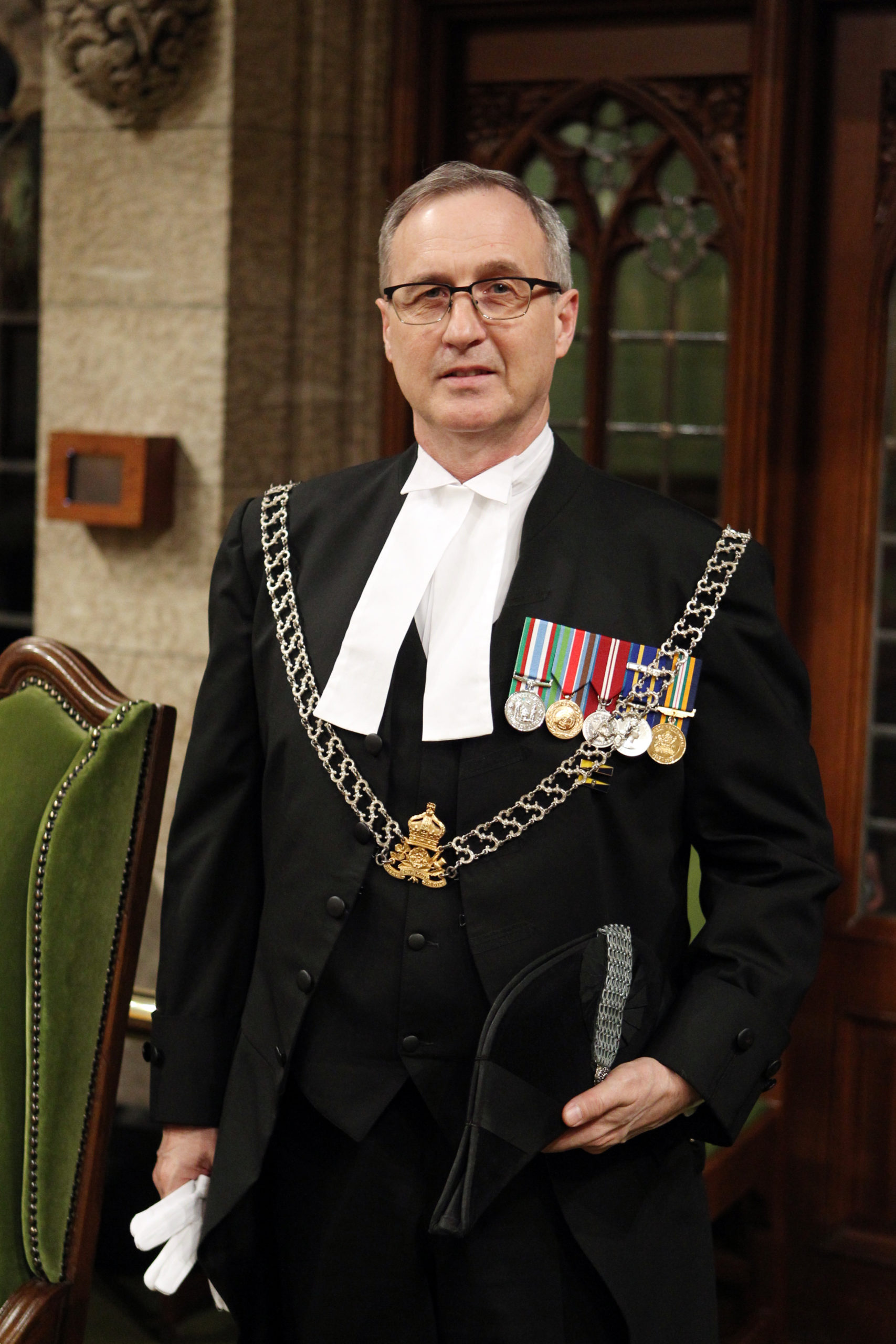
Pat McDonell: Sergeant-at-Arms for the Canadian House of Commons.

The sergeant-at-arms is the senior official of the House of Commons of Canada. In this role, the sergeant-at-arms is responsible for the building services and security of the House of Commons, and is appointed by the governor general acting on the advice of the federal cabinet. The sergeant-at-arms carries the mace, the symbol of the authority of the Crown, in the daily parade into the House of Commons chamber.

Captain Juchereau de St Denis LeMoyne served as sergeant-at-arms in the Senate of Canada from 1869 to 1923, but after his death the role there was re-designated as 'Assistant Usher of the Black Rod'; it is now termed 'mace bearer'.

Provincial legislative assemblies, houses of assembly, national assemblies, and provincial parliaments (the nomenclature for legislatures varying between provinces) also employ sergeants-at-arms.

René Jalbert, sergeant-at-arms of the National Assembly of Quebec, ended Denis Lortie's killing spree in the Quebec Parliament Building on 8 May 1984 by constituting himself hostage and negotiating with the shooter for four hours.

During the 2014 shootings at Parliament Hill, Ottawa, the sergeant-at-arms of the House of Commons, Kevin M. Vickers, assisted RCMP officers in engaging the gunman. Reports show that Sergeant-at-Arms Vickers, alongside RCMP Constable Curtis Barrett, shot and killed the gunman who had gained access to the Centre Block of the Canadian Parliament buildings.

=== Kenya ===
Serjeants at Arms serve both the Senate and the National Assembly in the Parliament of Kenya, performing ceremonial duties and maintaining order and decorum. They also oversee security and have responsibility for estate management, event management, housekeeping and other areas.

=== Liberia ===
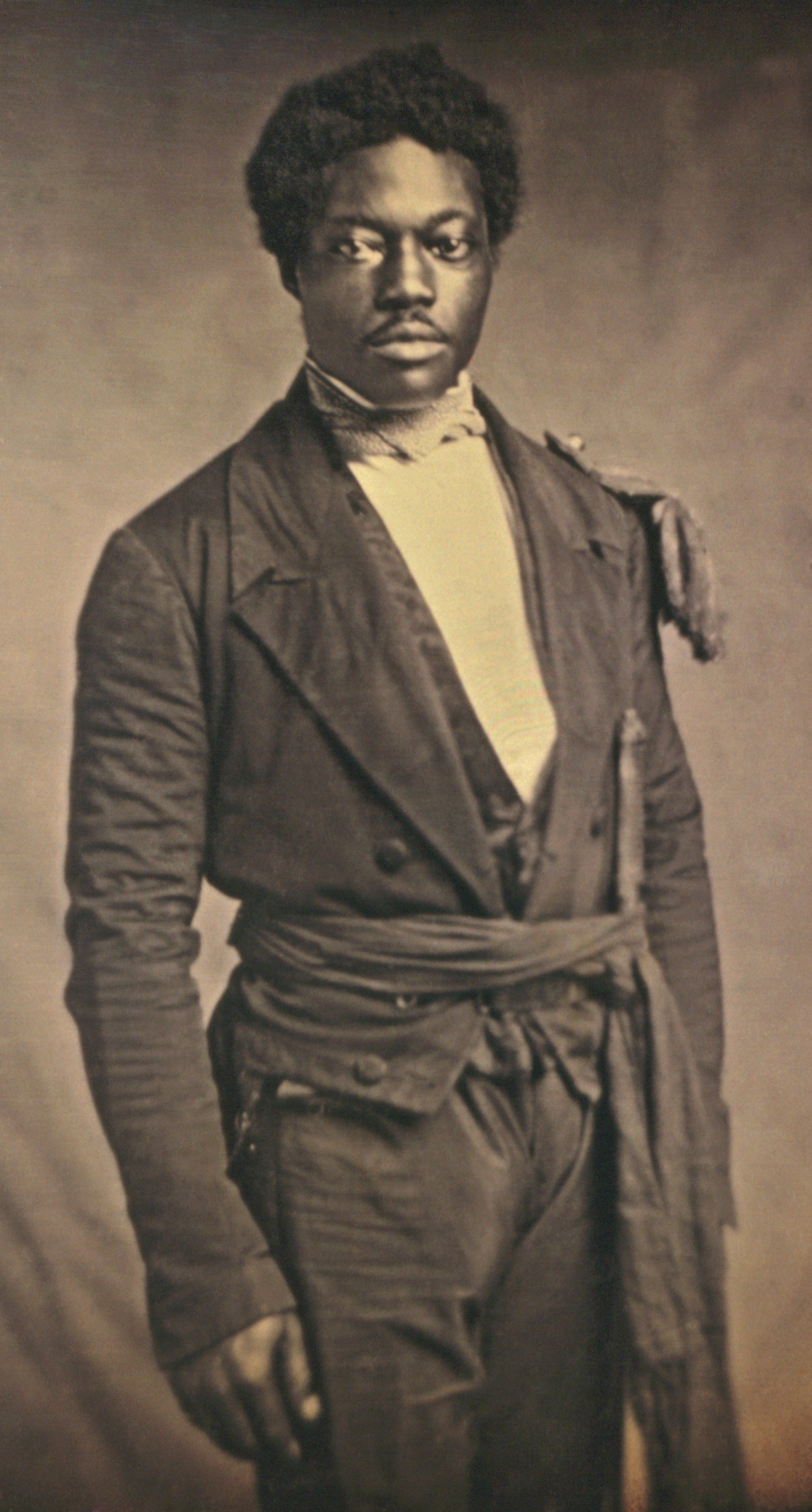
Portrait of Chancy Brown, an early sergeant-at-arms for the Senate of Liberia

In addition to the president pro tempore, the Senate of Liberia elects a secretary of the Senate, assistant secretary of the Senate and a sergeant-at-arms as officers of the Senate, though these positions are not held by sitting senators.

=== New Zealand ===
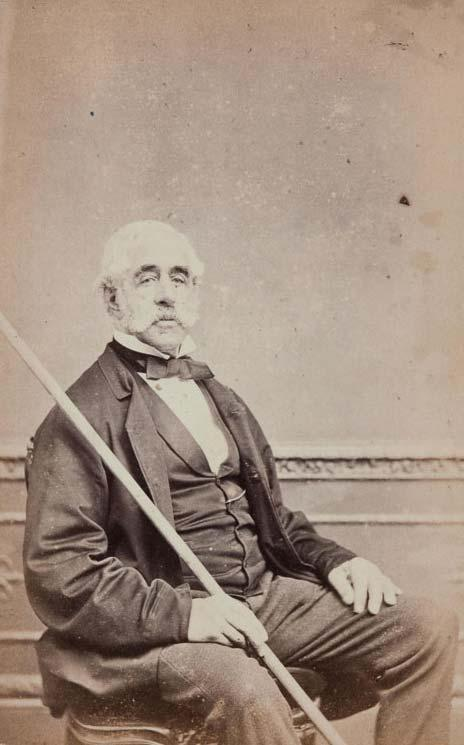
Edward Mayne holds his white wand (1861)

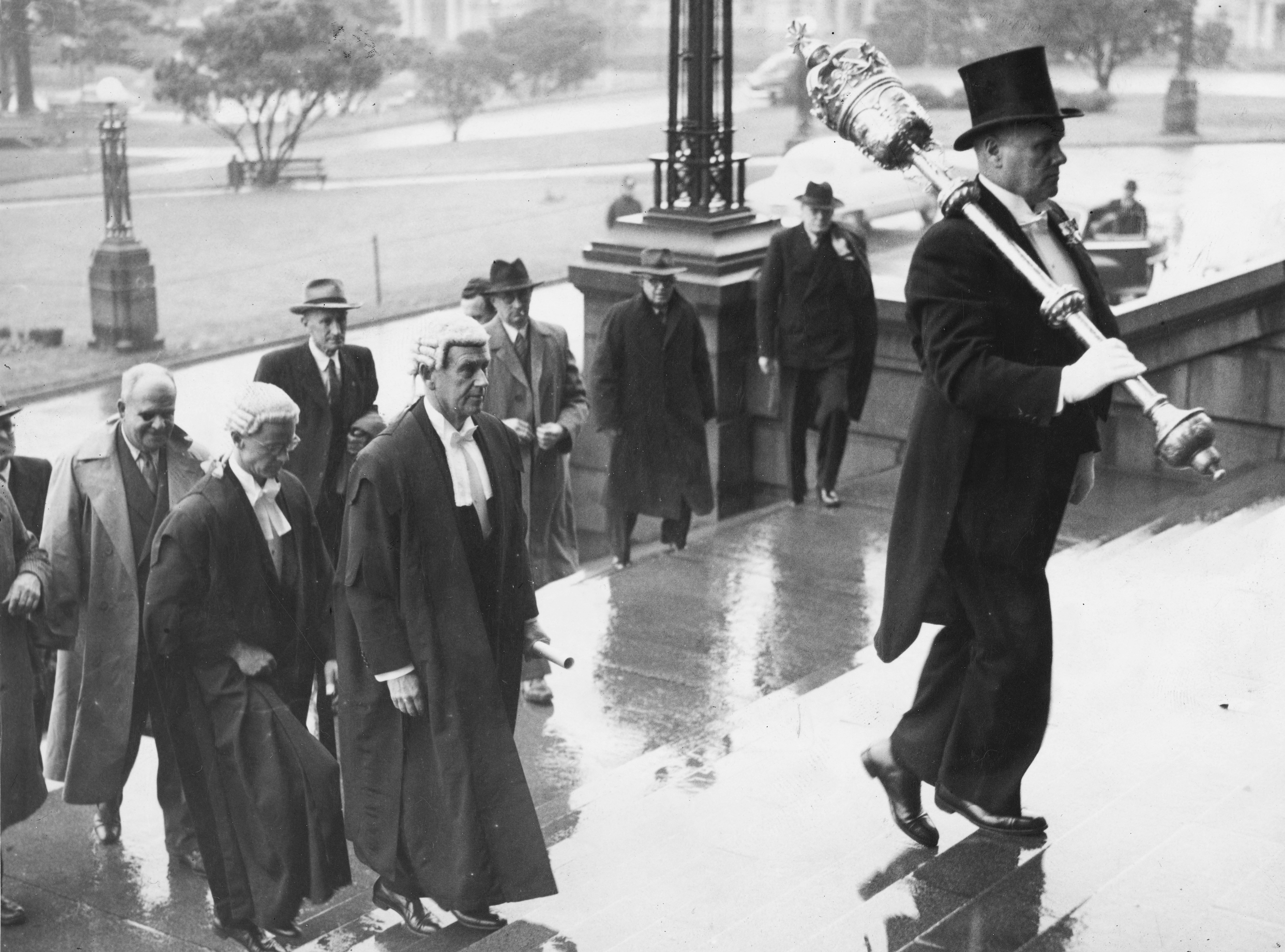
Serjeant-at-arms Group Captain A J Manson (with mace) in attendance at the opening of the New Zealand Parliament in 1950

The New Zealand House of Representatives operates under the Westminster parliamentary system.

The current serjeant-at-arms since 2016 is Captain Steve Streefkerk, RNZN (Rtd), a permanent officer of the House supported by the Chamber and Meeting Support Team.

The serjeant-at-arms controls officials and members staff coming to the House, and the surrounding areas such as the lobbies and the members lounge. There is involvement at select committees where the chairman seeks assistance to maintain good order. The serjeant-at-arms sits in the debating chamber opposite the speaker at the visitors door for each House sitting session to ensure that security is effective, good order is maintained, administers the Members Attendance Register and takes instructions from the speaker or the other presiding officers - deputy speaker or two assistant speakers, when they are presiding.

The chamber and meeting support officers control all access to the House, and attend to the needs of the members of parliaments, and officials when the House is undertaking its business.

The gallery operation for visitors or strangers is controlled by the Parliamentary Service Security Service, but the speaker and the serjeant-at-arms have the overall authority as defined in Standing Orders.

Past serjeants-at-arms have included:

- Philip Deck, the first serjeant-at-arms, appointed in 1854
- Edward Mayne, appointment gazetted on 25 January 1858 and pending retirement announced in September 1865
- Group Captain Alexander John Mackay Manson, from 1937 to 1965 (promoted to Usher of the Black Rod in May 1965)
- Wing Commander Bob McKay, from 1965
- Carol Rankin, the first woman to be serjeant-at-arms, appointed in 1985
- Ipi Cross
- Donald Cameron
- Fred Hutton, from 1998 to 2002
- Brent Smith, from 2003 to 2016.

=== Papua New Guinea ===
In the National Parliament of Papua New Guinea the Sergeant-at-Arms is custodian of the mace, which is "a symbol of Royal Authority and the authority of the House and Speaker". As well as carrying the mace, the Sergeant-at-Arms is custodian of the Members' attendance register: he allocates seats in the Chamber and keeps order during Sessions. Other duties include managing travel arrangements for Members and arranging visits to Parliament (whether for VIPs, schools, tourists or others).

=== Philippines ===
Each chamber of the Congress of the Philippines has its own sergeant-at-arms, has custody of that chamber's mace, and is responsible for the security of each chamber's premises. The Sergeant-at-Arms of the Senate of the Philippines and the Sergeant-at-Arms of the House of Representatives of the Philippines are usually elected from retired officers of the Armed Forces of the Philippines or of the Philippine National Police.

=== Singapore ===
The Parliament of Singapore operates under the Westminster parliamentary system. The serjeant-at-arms is an officer of the parliament as defined in section 2 of the Parliament (Privileges, Immunities and Powers) Act 1962 (PPIP Act). The serjeant-at-arms is also an officer of the Security department who assist the Security Director in security matters of the Parliament matters and may be drawn from ex-police officers or ex-army personnel.

The Mace of Singapore placed on the stand during session

The Serjeant-at-Arms bears the authority of the Speaker of Parliament, who carries out the following duties:

1. Ceremonially, acts as the custodian of the mace and lead the Speaker into the Parliament at the commencement of each Parliament sitting. The serjeant will place the mace at the stand on the table to signify that the parliament is in sitting.
2. Administratively, perform access control of all persons into the Parliament House and managing the security and admissions of all staff and visitors into the Parliament.
3. The Serjeant may also in accordance with sections 27 and 28 of the PPIP Act, and upon the Speaker's authority, ensure that any person(s) responsible for any disturbances in the Parliament House to be removed from the premises.
4. The Sergeant also executes the Speaker's warrant (or 'summons') to any member of public that is required to appear before a Parliamentary Hearing Committee.

=== South Africa ===
The serjeant-at-arms is a member of the parliamentary staff who acts as the official guardian of the mace, a decorated rod which is the symbol of the authority of the Parliament of South Africa. The mace must be in position in the National Assembly chamber during a plenary sitting.

The serjeant-at-arms is also responsible for maintaining the attendance register of the members of House members. They must also maintain order in the House and remove people from the House as ordered by the speaker.

According to the National Assembly Rules, "the Serjeant-at-Arms shall remove, or cause to be removed, any stranger from any part of a Chamber which has been set apart for members only, and also any stranger who, having been admitted into any other part of the Chamber, misconducts himself or herself or does not withdraw when strangers are ordered to withdraw."

The serjeant-at-arms is attired in a black tailcoat, waistcoat, starched white shirt, bow tie, and white gloves. The current serjeant-at-arms is Tebello Maleeme, who was preceded by Regina Mhlomi, who succeeded Godfrey Cleinwerck. The usher of the black rod is Vincent Shabalala, whose duty it is to escort the presiding officers of the National Council of Provinces into its chamber.

=== Sri Lanka ===
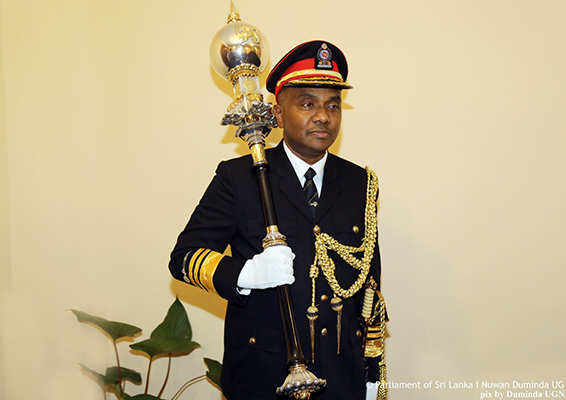
Narendra Fernando, Serjeant-at-Arms of the Sri Lankan Parliament (2018–2024).

The Parliament of Sri Lanka was established in the form of the Westminster parliamentary system. The serjeant-at-arms is appointed by the secretary general of Parliament and is responsible for all ceremonial occasions as the master of ceremonies in Parliament, preservation of order, custody of the mace, security, admission of visitors, allocation of accommodation within the House and supervision of galleries. Assisting the serjeant-at-arms in his duties would be the deputy serjeant-at-arms and the assistant serjeant-at-arms.

Responsible for security, by tradition he is the only officer authorized to carry a weapon (ceremonial sword) inside the Parliament building and is assisted by the Parliament Police Division. Admission of visitors to the precincts of Parliament is controlled by the serjeant-at-arms. The serjeant-at-arms and assistant serjeant-at-arms would wear a white uniform with medal ribbons during normal sittings of parliament. On ceremonial occasions they would wear a uniform similar to a No. 1 Dress uniform of a major general in the Sri Lanka Army, with varied gorget patchs and epaulette similar to a flag officer of the Sri Lanka Navy.

During the normal sitting days of the House, the serjeant-at-arms wears a white colour uniform and on ceremonial occasions is clad with specially designed black colour ceremonial attire (equivalent to the rank of the major-general).

The first serjeant-at-arms of Parliament was M. Ismail MBE, who was appointed in 1947. Ronnie Abeysinghe was the longest serving serjeant-at-arms in the history of Sri Lanka. He held the position from 1970 to 1996. As of 2024 the current serjeant-at-arms is Kushan Sampath Jayaratne.

=== Uganda ===
In the Parliament of Uganda, the Sergeant at Arms has responsibility for security, health and safety services, maintenance and cleaning services, the allocation of offices and committee rooms, and ceremonial duties.

=== United Kingdom ===
==== Parliament ====
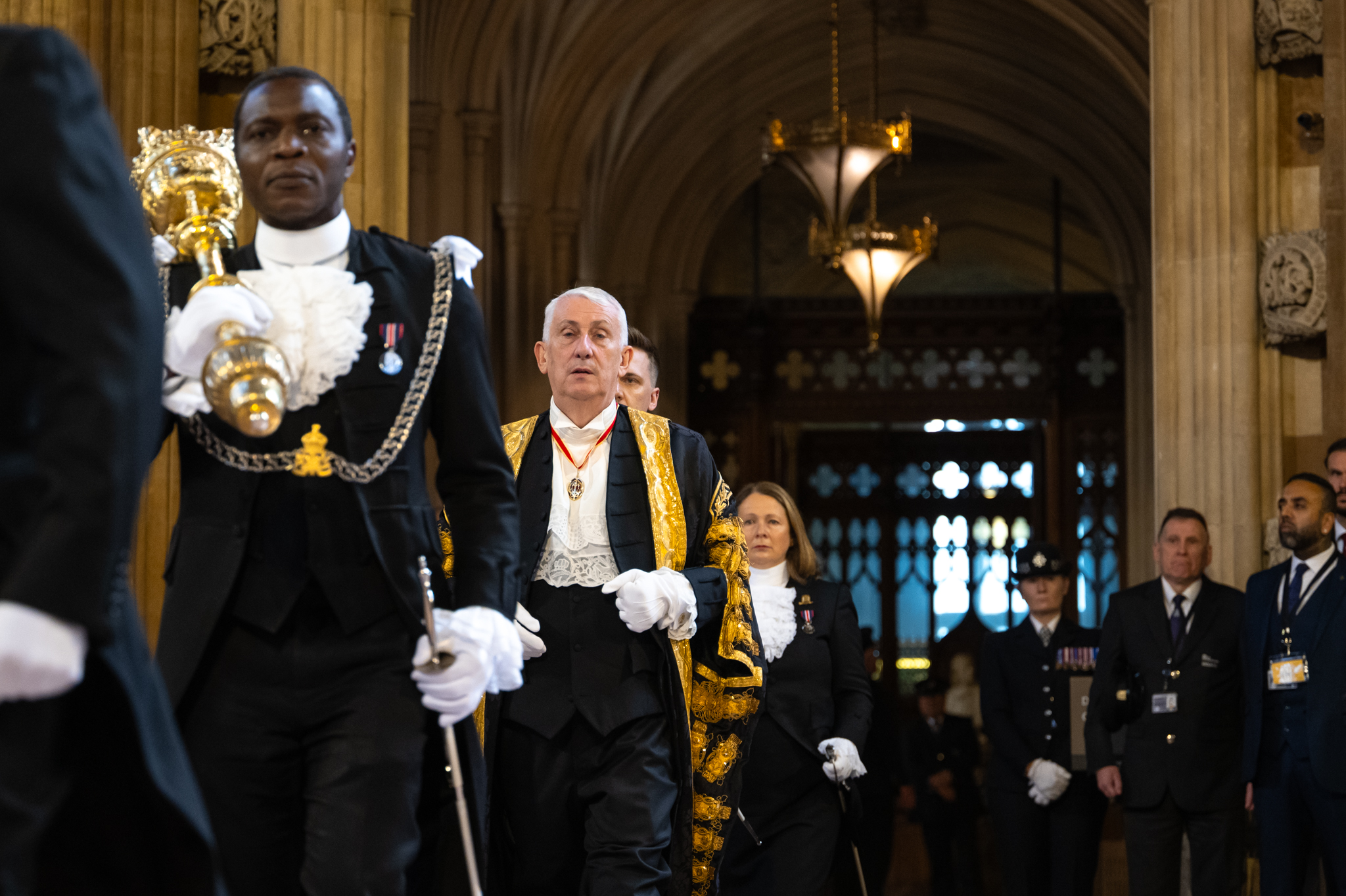
Serjeant at Arms (left, with mace) walking before the Speaker of the House of Commons at the Palace of Westminster.

In the UK, the Serjeant at Arms of the House of Commons is responsible for "keeping order within the House of Commons Chamber during debates, and for the general security of, and access to, the House of Commons as a whole". The Serjeant also carries out administrative and ceremonial duties. He is custodian of the mace, and carries it before the Speaker when he (or she) enters and leaves at the beginning and end of the day; and he oversees the Commons Doorkeepers, who assist with security and other areas of work.

The Serjeant at Arms (or one of his deputies) is always on duty in the chamber when the House is sitting. The duty serjeant sits in an elevated seat, facing the Speaker, alongside the Bar (or threshold) of the House. When a stranger comes to the Bar of the House (for example as a witness or petitioner) the Serjeant will stand by them with the mace. The Serjeant can order strangers to withdraw from the premises if they are behaving irregularly, and will escort Members of Parliament out of the chamber if ordered to do so by the Speaker.

The Serjeant is appointed by the Sovereign (under a warrant from the Lord Chamberlain and by patent under the Great Seal) to "attend upon His Majesty's person when there is no Parliament; and at the time of every Parliament, to attend upon the Speaker of the House of Commons". The current serjeant-at-arms is Ugbana Oyet (appointed in October 2019); he was previously an electrical engineer in Parliament. The Serjeant is assisted by a staff which includes the Deputy Serjeant at Arms and Assistant Serjeant at Arms.

Through the 20th century the post was usually held by retired military officers who had subsequently joined the staff of the House; since 2008 those from a civil service background have generally been appointed. In 2008 the responsibilities of the Serjeant at Arms' department were significantly reduced: a new Department of Facilities was created, which took over responsibility for cleaning, catering, works and areas of the Parliamentary Estate. As a result, the number of full-time Serjeants was reduced from five to three (one Serjeant, one Deputy and one Assistant); while other members of staff have been designated 'Associate Serjeants', to ensure that there is always one Serjeant available to be present in the chamber when the House is sitting.

Since the post-war rebuilding of the Commons, the office of the Serjeant of Arms has been in the 'upper oratory' of the cloisters (one of the oldest surviving parts of the Palace of Westminster); as he is expected to be available to the Speaker by night or by day, the Serjeant is provided with an official residence within the Palace. When attending the Speaker, the Serjeant at Arms wears court dress (as do the Deputy, Assistant and Associate Serjeants when on duty).

The equivalent officer for the House of Lords is the Gentleman (or Lady) Usher of the Black Rod (also known simply as Black Rod), whose role includes similar duties and responsibilities. There was formerly a separate Serjeant-at-Arms of the House of Lords (albeit he was technically, according to Erskine May, an officer of the Lord Chancellor rather than of the House). In 1962 this office was combined with that of Yeoman Usher of the Black Rod (Black Rod's deputy), and since 1971 the office has been held by Black Rod himself (or herself), though the mace is still routinely carried by the Yeoman Usher (as Deputy Serjeant-at-Arms).

By custom, 'Serjeant at Arms' is written without hyphens when it relates to the House of Commons, but is hyphenated when it relates to the House of Lords.

==== The Royal Household ====
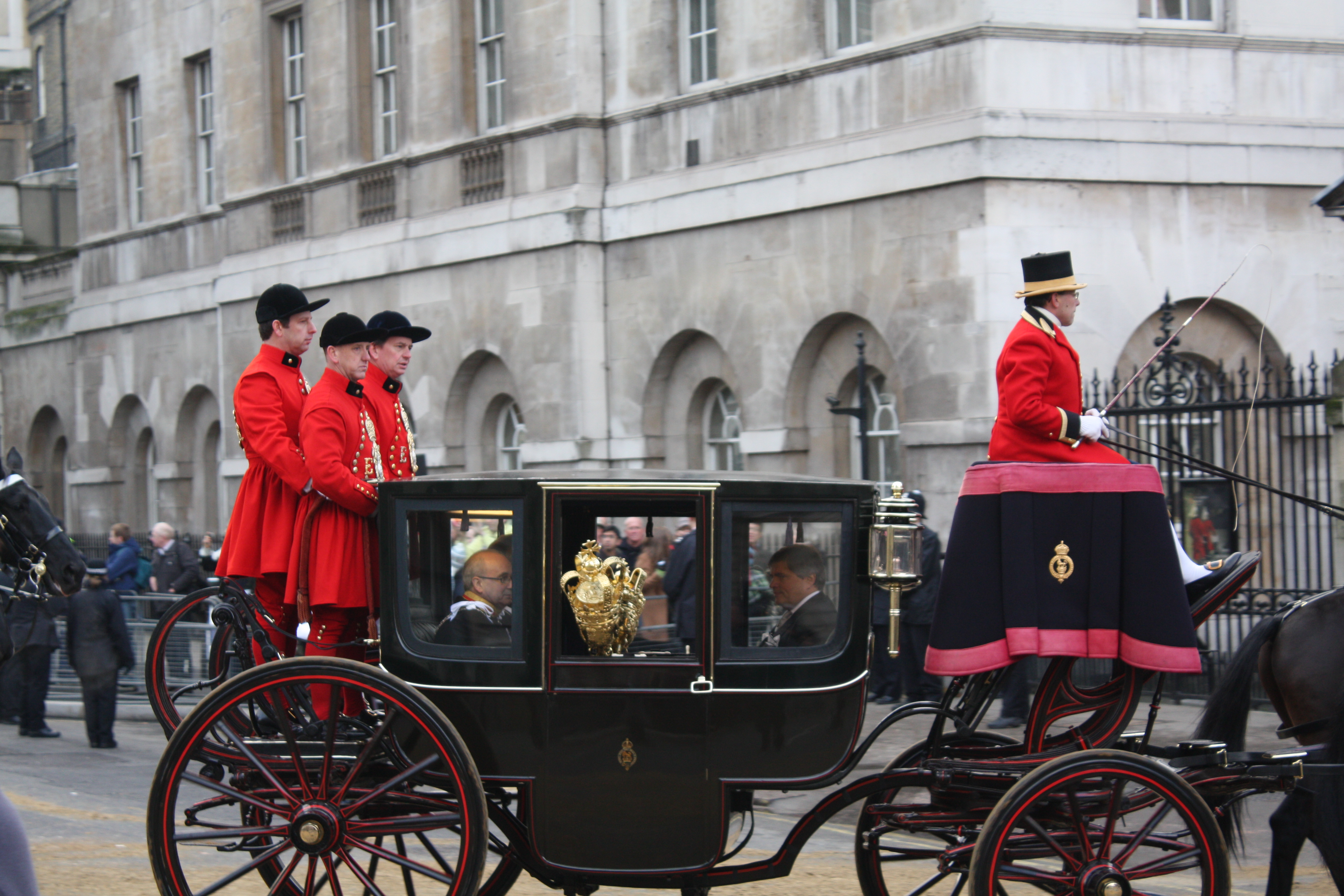
Serjeants-at-arms with their maces, travelling back to Buckingham Palace from Westminster after the State Opening of Parliament.

In addition to the above-mentioned officers there are other serjeants-at-arms who attend the sovereign on state occasions, a remnant of the body established by Richard I (though today their role is purely ceremonial). Usually, members of the Royal Household who serve as serjeants-at-arms have had the office bestowed on them as a mark of distinction for long and meritorious service.

==== Insignia ====
The mace serves as a symbol of royal and parliamentary authority. Ten maces are kept in the Jewel House at the Tower of London in addition to those kept by the House of Commons, the House of Lords and the Lord Chancellor. As well as carrying their maces, on state occasions each serjeant-at-arms wears a collar of esses as a symbol of their office. (As a testament to the symbolic power of the insignia, when the Republic of Ireland declared independence from the United Kingdom at the First Dáil in 1919, one of the first decisions declared was that there was to be "no robes, no mace, no velveted sergeant-at-arms".)

Whenever Parliament is dissolved, the mace is returned to St James's Palace and the serjeant-at-arms reverts to being a member of the Royal Household.

==== City of London ====
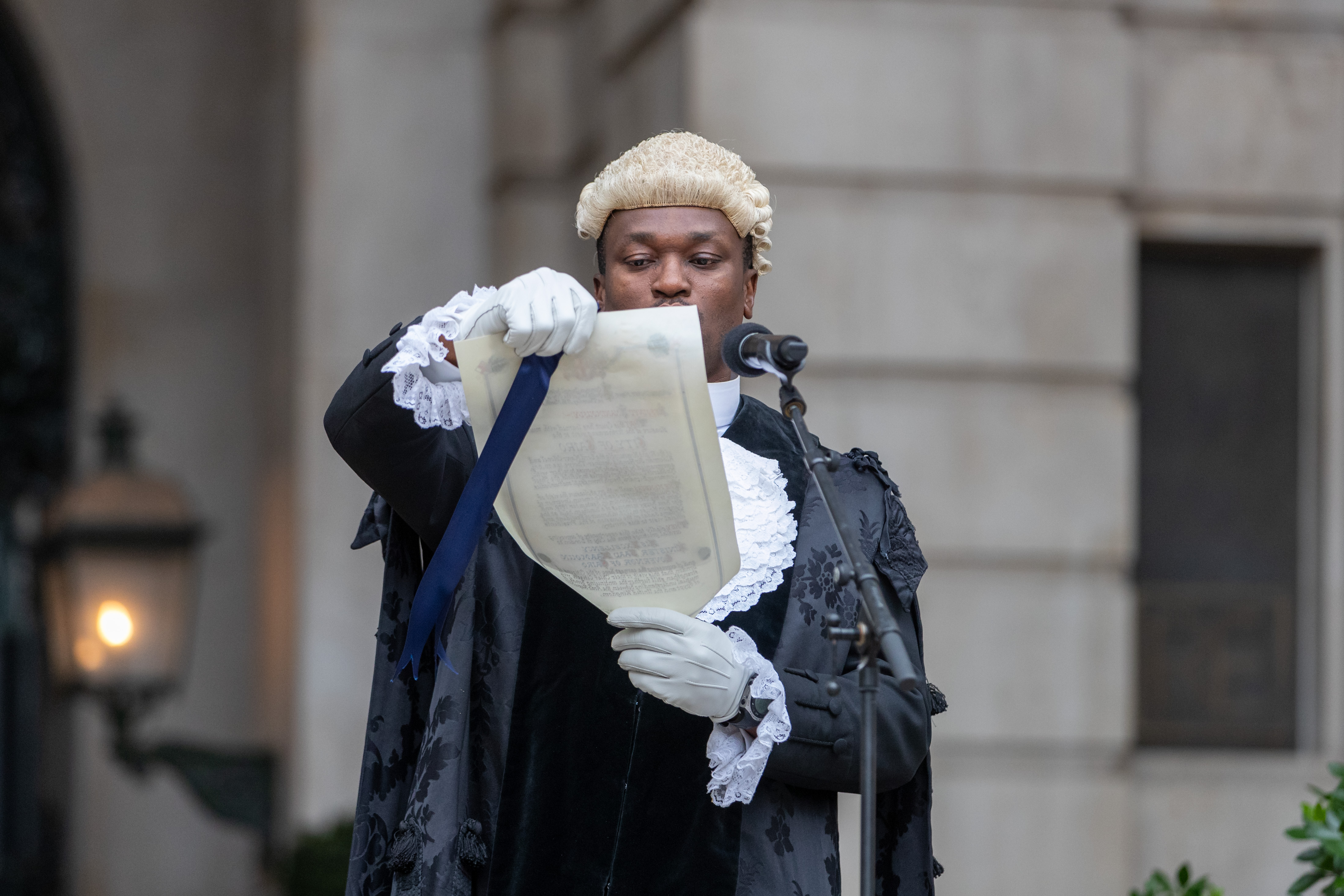
Common Cryer and Serjeant-at-Arms of the City of London Major Peter Oweh announcing the dissolution of parliament in 2024.

Since at least the 14th century, the Lord Mayor of London has been led by the Common Cryer and Serjeant-at-Arms, commonly called the Macebearer, carrying the Mace of the City of London. The role carries ceremonial duties, including opening proceedings and announcing the dissolution of parliament. In December 2022, Major Peter Oweh was selected to hold the position.

=== United States ===
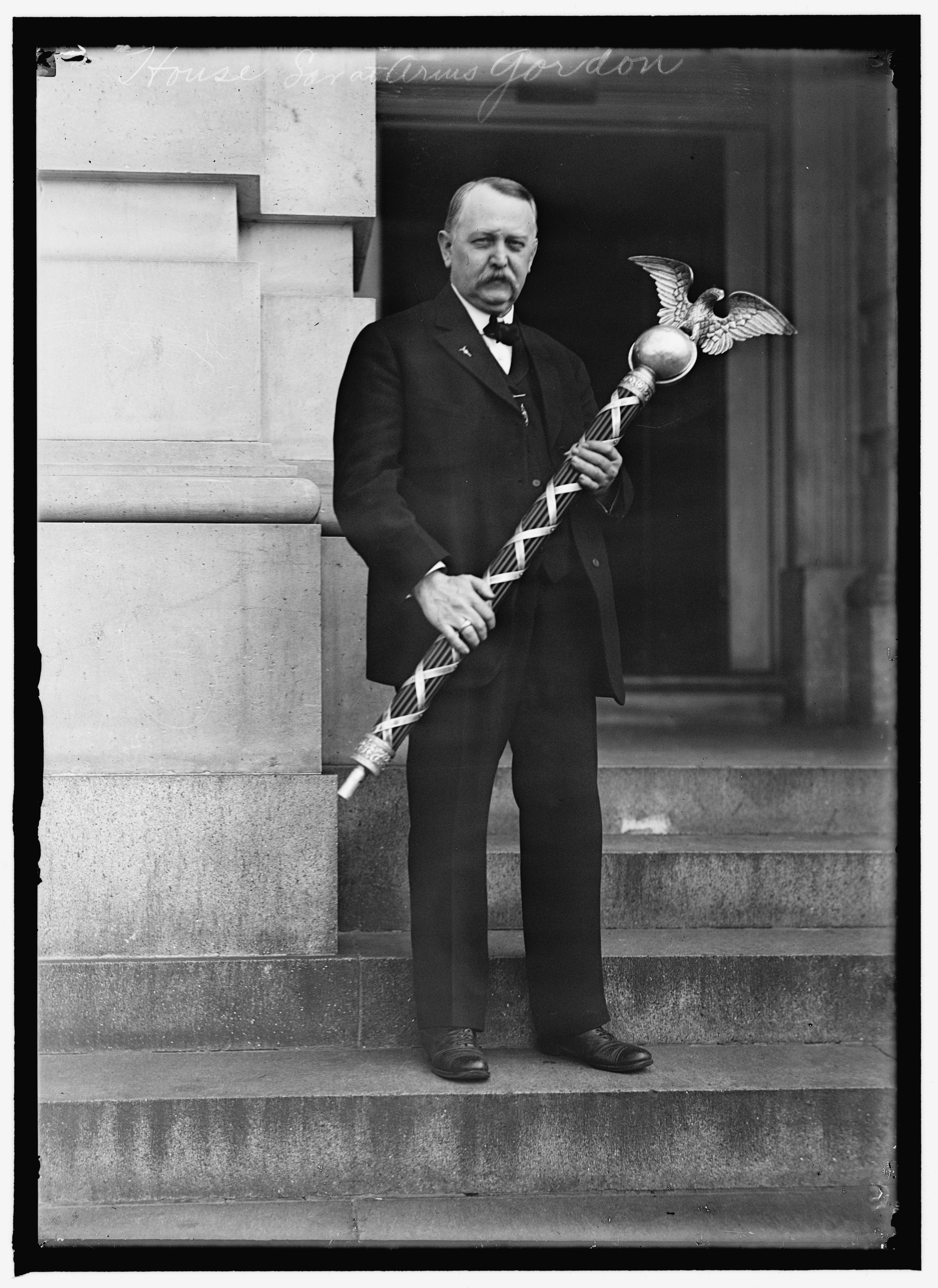
Robert B. Gordon, Sergeant at Arms of the United States House of Representatives, with mace.

The two houses of the United States Congress maintain the position of sergeant-at-arms. The sergeants are charged with the maintenance of order on the floor of the chamber (in the House, he may "display" the mace in front of an unruly member as an admonition to behave); they serve with the Architect of the Capitol on the commission that oversees the United States Capitol Police and security for the Congress, and they serve a variety of other functional and ceremonial roles.

=== Zimbabwe ===
In Zimbabwe, the National Assembly and the Senate are each served by a Serjeant at Arms. The Serjeant at Arms functions as Housekeeper of Parliament Buildings, "responsible for the maintenance of the building, furniture and equipment, provision of refreshments, general cleanliness of the institution and ceremonial duties". The Serjeant at Arms carries the mace before the Speaker or President of the Senate, ensures that decorum is kept in the chamber and associated spaces, and is empowered to "eject defaulting Members of Parliament from the Chamber".

== Other bodies ==
Other bodies—from state and local legislative houses (city councils, county legislatures and the like) to civic and social organizations—have created posts of sergeants-at-arms, primarily to enforce order at the direction of the chair and to assist in practical details of organizing meetings. Other duties may include the greeting of visitors or providing security. The sergeant-at-arms may be in charge of the organization's property.

The title is also used in criminal motorcycle clubs like Hells Angels.

In large organizations, the sergeant-at-arms may have assistants.

A law enforcement officer may serve in the role of sergeant-at-arms or it may be a paid (or unpaid), permanent position in the organization.
