= Narendra Fernando =

Former Serjeant-at-Arms

Narendra Mihindukumar Fernando
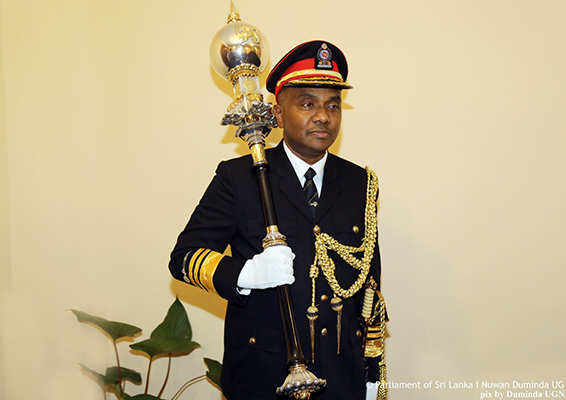

6th Serjeant - at - Arms of the Parliament of Sri Lanka
- In office 2018–2024

Personal details
- Born: 31 January 1964 Wellawatte, Sri Lanka
- Spouse: Thushanthi Fernando
- Children: Anuja Fernando
- Education: Isipathana College

Narendra Mihindukumar Fernando served as the Sixth Serjeant–at–Arms of the Parliament of Sri Lanka from 30 August 2018 to 30 January 2024. His tenure was under the speakership of Karu Jayasooriya and Mahinda Yapa Abeywardena. He succeeded Anil Samarasekara, the 5th Serjeant–at-arms.

== Early life ==
Narendra Mihindukumar Fernando was born to Mr. W. S. M. Fernando and Mrs. S. M. Samarasooriya Fernando on 31 January 1964 in Wellawatta. His father was a Deputy Hansard Editor in Parliament of Sri Lanka and his beloved mother is a housewife. He studied at Isipathana College Colombo from 1969 to 1981. He played for the 1st XI Cricket Team and represented the Club Level in Cricket. He also represented the School in Athletics with National Level achievements.

== Education ==
B. Com Degree in Human Resource Management, India. Attachment Training Programmes in the House of Commons, UK; the House of Representatives and the Senate, Australia; State Legislature of New South Wales, Australia; Lok Sabha, India. Study Tour to Peoples Republic of China with a Parliamentary Delegation

== Personal life ==
Narendra Fernando is married to Mrs. Thushanthi Fernando, Dual Citizen of Australia and Sri Lanka; Professionally Qualified Accountant, ACMA (UK) and CPA (Australia); Work as an Accountant for an Australian Company at present. He is also the father of Anuja Imantha Fernando; Dual Citizen of Australia and Sri Lanka; Double Degree Holder, (BBus, SITS 1st Class Honours) in Information Technology and Systems and Business and Commerce, Monash University Australia, Employed in Australia as a Director at Deloitte Australia
