= Irreparable injury =

Term in equity

An irreparable injury is, in equity, "the type of harm which no monetary compensation can cure or put conditions back the way they were."

== The irreparable injury rule ==
It has traditionally been a requirement of equity that no relief can be granted unless there is irreparable injury. This requirement, commonly called the "irreparable injury rule", has been the subject of sustained academic criticism, especially by remedies scholar Douglas Laycock, who has argued at length that the rule does not actually explain the decisions of courts in the United States. Nevertheless, the irreparable injury rule was reaffirmed by the U.S. Supreme Court in eBay v. MercExchange, 547 U.S. 388 (2006), a case in which the Court announced a test for injunctive relief that required, among other things, that the plaintiff prove "that it has suffered an irreparable injury".

== The concept of irreparable injury in various jurisdictions ==
The general idea that there are irreparable injuries has been recognized in various jurisdictions.

=== United Nations ===
The United Nations Staff Rules recognize the concept for the purpose of employment appeals.

=== United States ===
Virtually every state recognizes the concept under common law or equity, including New York Oklahoma, South Dakota, and Utah.

In addition to state law, the federal government takes note of the purpose of an injunction as being to "prevent irreparable damage or injury".

=== Africa ===
The East Africa Court of Justice has noted the concept in enjoining an election in Kenya.

=== Philippines ===
Philippines law notes the phrase in employment law, in a report regarding indigenous peoples, as well as in agrarian reform.

== See also ==
- Equity (law)
- Injunction
- Preliminary injunction
- Temporary restraining order
- Quia timet
