= Contra formam collationis =

Writ in English law

In English law, contra format collations was a writ to recover donations in a situation where a man had given perpetual alms to a religious house, hospital, school, or the like, and the governor or managers had alienated the lands, contrary to the intention of the donor.

== See also ==
- Contra formam feoffamenti
- Contributione facienda
