= Anil Samarasekera =

Serjeant-at-Arms of the Sri Lankan Parliament

Serjeant-at-Arms of the Sri Lankan Parliament
- Incumbent
- Assumed office 2006
- Preceded by: Wijaya Palliyaguruge

Personal details
- Born: Sri Lanka

Anil Parakrama Samarasekera is the current Serjeant-at-Arms of the Sri Lankan Parliament.

Samarasekera was educated at Royal College, Colombo. He joined the Sri Lanka Navy as a Cadet Officer receiving his training at the Naval and Maritime Academy and was commissioned as an Acting Sub Lieutenant, undergoing special training in India. During his naval career, he served as a naval instructor at the Kotelawala Defence Academy and the Naval and Maritime Academy. He was also seconded to the Sri Lanka Shipping Corporation. He left the navy with the rank of Lieutenant.

After leaving the navy, Samarasekera joined the parliamentary service in 1996 as the Assistant Serjeant-at-Arms. Later he was promoted to the post of Deputy Serjeant-at-Arms and underwent training at the House of Commons in 2003. In 2006, he succeeded Wijaya Palliyaguruge as the 5th Serjeant-at-Arms of the Sri Lankan Parliament.
