= Curia claudenda =

Curia claudenda is an old English writ, used to compel a party to enclose his land.
