= Contributione facienda =

Writ

In English law, contributione facienda is a writ which lies where several persons are jointly bound to the same thing, and one or more of them refuse to contribute their share.

For example, if tenants in common, or joint, hold a mill pro indiviso, and equally share the profits thereof; the mill falling to decay, and one or more of them refusing to contribute to its reparation, the rest shall have this writ to compel them.

== See also ==
- Contra formam collationis
- Contra formam feoffamenti
