= De Ventre Inspiciendo =

A De Ventre Inspiciendo (Latin for "of inspecting the belly") is a writ issued out of chancery to inspect the body, where a woman feigns to be pregnant, to see whether she is with child. It lies for the heir presumptive to examine a widow suspected to be feigning pregnancy in order to enable a supposititious heir to obtain the estate. It lay also where a woman sentenced to death pleaded pregnancy. This writ has also been recognized in the United States.
