= De post disseisina =

De post disseisina (Law Latin, "of past disseisin") is a historical writ "for recovery of land by a person who had previously recovered the land from a disseisor by a praecipe quod reddat [a different type of writ) or on a default or reddition, but who was again disseised by the same disseisor." A similar writ is de redisseisina.
