= Contra formam feoffamenti =

Writ in English law

In English law, contra formam feoffamenti was a writ for a tenant who was infeoffed by the lord's charter to make certain suit and service to his court, and was afterwards distrained for more than was contained therein.

== See also ==
- Contra formam collationis
- Contributione facienda
