= De parco fracto =

Historical common-law writ

De parco fracto (Law Latin "of pound breach") is a historical common-law writ against a person, often an owner, "who breaks into a pound to rescue animals that have been legally distrained and impounded."

The writ is mentioned in Blackstone's Commentaries on the Laws of England: "And, being thus in the custody of the law, the taking them back by force is looked upon as an atrocious injury, and denominated a rescous, for which the distreinor has a remedy in damages, either by writ of rescous, in case they were going to the pound, or by writ de parco fracto, or pound-breach, in case they were actually impounded."
