= Commission of rebellion =

Process of contempt on the nonappearance of a defendant

In old English law, a commission of rebellion, or writ of rebellion, was a process of contempt on the nonappearance of a defendant. It was issued out when a man, after proclamation issued out of the chancery, or the exchequer, and made by the sheriff, to present himself, under pain of his allegiance, to the court by a certain day, does not appear.
