= Warrantia chartae =

Warrantia chartae is an ancient and now obsolete writ, which was issued when a man was enfeoffed of land with warranty, and then he was sued or impleaded in assize or other action, in which he could not vouch or call to warranty. It was brought by the feoffor pending the first suit against him, and had this valuable incident, that when the warrantor was vouched, and judgment passed against the tenant, the latter obtained judgment simultaneously against the warrantor, to recover other lands of equal value.
