= Monstraverunt =

The writ of Monstraverunt (Latin: Monstraverunt nobis, "They have shown to us") was a writ in English common law used exclusively by tenants of the Ancient Demesne to protect themselves against the imposition of new or increased feudal services by their lords. Historically significant as an early form of "class action" lawsuit, the writ allowed technically unfree peasants to sue their lords in the King's courts—a privilege generally denied to standard villeins.
