= Private jurisdiction =

Private jurisdiction is the right of an individual or a legal entity to establish courts of law. It was prevalent during feudalism.

== See also ==
- High, middle and low justice
- Court baron
- Court leet
