= Gosset (surname) =

Gosset is a surname. Notable people with the surname include:

- Danny Gosset (born 1994), professional footballer
- David Gosset (born 1970), global affairs analyst
- Éléonore Gosset (born 1977), French actress
- Gosset (cartoonist) (circa 1933-2018), Spanish cartoonist
- Sir Ralph Allen Gosset (1809–1885), Serjeant at Arms of the British House of Commons
- Thorold Gosset (1869–1962), English lawyer and amateur mathematician
- Ulysse Gosset (born 1955), French journalist and news anchor
- William Driscoll Gosset (1822–1899), British Army officer, engineer and surveyor
- William Gosset (politician) (1782–1848), British Army officer and member of parliament
- William Sealy Gosset (1876–1937), English chemist and statistician

== See also ==
- Gossett
