= Isaac Gosset =

Isaac Gosset may refer to:

- Isaac Gosset (bibliographer) (1745–1812), English bibliographer
- Isaac Gosset (sculptor) (1713–1799), sculptor and wax-modeller
- Isaac Henry Gosset (1907–1965), British consultant paediatrician
