= Gosset (disambiguation) =

Gosset is a French Champagne house founded in 1584.

Gosset may also refer to:

- Gosset (surname), a surname
- Gosset (cartoonist) (1933–2018), a Spanish cartoonist
