= Admiral Keppel =

Admiral Keppel may refer to:

- Augustus Keppel, 1st Viscount Keppel (1725–1786), Royal Navy officer and politician
- Colin Keppel (1862–1947), Royal Navy officer
- Henry Keppel (1809–1904), Royal Navy officer
