= William Gosset (British Army officer, born 1782) =

British Member of Parliament (1782–1848)

Major-General Sir William Gosset KCH CB
- Born: 18 January 1782; St Saviour, Jersey
- Died: 27 March 1848 (aged 66); Charlton, Kent, England
- Spouse: Gertude Martha Daniell
- Children: Sir Ralph Gosset
- Military career
- Allegiance: United Kingdom
- Branch: British Army
- Service years: 1798–1848
- Rank: Major-General
- Unit: Royal Engineers
- Conflicts: Napoleonic Wars; Bombardment of Algiers
- Awards: Knight bachelor Knight Commander of the Royal Guelphic Order

Major-General Sir William Gosset KCH CB (18 January 1782 – 27 March 1848) was a British Army officer who served as Serjeant-at-Arms of the House of Commons from 1835 to 1847.

== Early life and family ==
Gosset was born in Jersey and was of French Huguenot descent. He was the son of Matthieu Gosset of Bagot and his second wife, Marguerite Durell. He had three half-brothers by his father's first marriage, including Matthew Gosset, Viscount of Jersey. His great-uncle was the sculptor Isaac Gosset and his uncle, also named Isaac, was a noted bibliophile.

== Career ==
Gosset was commissioned into the Royal Engineers in 1798. During the Napoleonic Wars, he was sent to Holland in the Walcheren Campaign in 1809. Gosset was secretary to William à Court's mission to the Barbary States in 1813.

During the Bombardment of Algiers in August 1816, he served as major commandant of the engineers under Admiral Viscount Exmouth and destroyed an enemy frigate. In honour of his assistance, he was appointed a Commander of the Order of the Bath (CB) by Queen Victoria in November 1816, and the following year was appointed a Commander of the Order of Saint Ferdinand and of Merit, by King Ferdinand I of the Two Sicilies.

He served as Member of Parliament for Truro from 1820 to 1826, secretary to Lord Anglesey as Master-General of the Ordnance from 1827 to 1828, private secretary to Anglesey as Lord Lieutenant of Ireland from 1828 to 1829, Under-Secretary for Ireland from 1831 to 1835 and Serjeant-at-Arms of the House of Commons from 1835 until his death.

He was knighted in 3 May 1831 by the Queen and appointed a Knight Commander in the Royal Guelphic Order that same year.

== Personal life ==
In 1808, he married Gertrude Martha, daughter of Ralph Allen Daniell of Trelissick, near Truro. He settled in Cornwall, where he and his wife had one son – who also served as Serjeant-at-Arms – and three daughters.

- Sir Ralph Gosset KCB (1809–1885), Serjeant-at-Arms from 1875–85
- Elizabeth Louisa Gosset (1811–1897), married Frederick Willis, Esq.
- Gertrude Mary Gosset (1814–1879)
- Jennetta Anne Gosset (1817–1890), married Wilbraham Taylor, son of Edward Taylor, MP

Government offices
Preceded by Henry Seymour	Serjeant-at-Arms of the House of Commons; 1835–1848	Succeeded by Lord Charles Russell
