= Jill Pay =

Serjeant at Arms of the British House of Commons

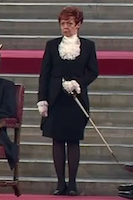
- Pay in 2011

Serjeant at Arms of the British House of Commons
- In office 30 January 2008 – 31 January 2012
- Speaker: Michael Martin; John Bercow
- Preceded by: Peter Grant Peterkin
- Succeeded by: Lawrence Ward

Personal details
- Born: 10 May 1951 (age 74) Croydon, London
- Spouse: John Pay

Jill Pay (born 10 May 1951) is a retired official of the Parliament of the United Kingdom. She was Serjeant at Arms in the House of Commons. Pay is the first woman to have held the position. Her appointment was unusual in that the position had hitherto normally been reserved for those with a military background. Pay's position conferred responsibility for security in the House of Commons. She retired on 31 January 2012.

== Career ==
Pay replaced Major General Peter Grant Peterkin as Serjeant at Arms in 2008. She had previously worked as a business manager in the civil service. She was appointed Head Office Keeper in the House of Commons Service in 1994. She was appointed Deputy Serjeant at Arms in 2004. Before she assumed the role of Serjeant at Arms, the role of the Serjeant in the House of Commons Service had been downgraded through organisational restructuring, something with which the Queen was said to be unhappy, since the position is a Crown appointment. Jill Pay was not granted the traditional audience with the monarch.

=== Damian Green search ===
In 2008, Pay became embroiled in political controversy when it was revealed she was the official who had consented to a police search on Damian Green's Commons office. There was some suggestion that Pay was made a scapegoat in order to protect the reputation of the then Commons Speaker Michael Martin.

=== After being Serjeant at Arms ===
Since being the Serjeant at Arms, Pay has worked with charities to promote various causes; notably, women's entrepreneurship with the Pink Shoe Club and children's literacy with Coram Beanstalk. She has recently worked on the Women and Enterprise All Party Parliamentary Group report on women's enterprise.

== See also ==
- Black Rod
- Serjeant at Arms of the British House of Commons

Parliament of the United Kingdom
Preceded by Peter Grant Peterkin	Serjeant-at-Arms of the House of Commons; 2008–2012	Succeeded by Lawrence Ward
