= Michael Cummins =

Michael Cummins may refer to:

- Micky Cummins (born 1978), Irish footballer
- Michael Cummins (serjeant-at-arms) (1939–2020), Serjeant-at-Arms of the British House of Commons
