= Charles Howard (serjeant-at-arms) =

British parliamentary official and army officer

Brigadier Sir Charles Alfred Howard, GCVO, DSO* (29 July 1878 – 1958) was a British Army officer and parliamentary official from the aristocratic Howard family. He served as Serjeant-at-Arms of the House of Commons from 1935 to 1956.

== Early life ==
Howard was born at Hazelby Manor, East Woodhay, Hampshire, the youngest of four children of the Hon. Greville Theophilus Howard (1836–1880; a younger son of Charles Howard, 17th Earl of Suffolk) and Lady Audrey Jane Charlotte (died 1926), daughter of John Townshend, 4th Marquess Townshend. Howard's sister Joyce was married to Sir Arthur Doyle, 4th Baronet, and was the mother of Diana Spearman. His father died when he was 2, and his mother remarried General Sir Redvers Henry Buller. His half-sister was Dame Georgiana Buller.

== Career ==
After schooling at Eton College, Howard attended the Royal Military College, Sandhurst, and was commissioned a second lieutenant in The King's (Shropshire Light Infantry) regiment on 3 August 1898. He was posted in India until 1899 and then, from late February 1900, in South Africa, where he was an aide-de-camp to his stepfather during the Second Boer War. He was promoted to lieutenant on 9 May 1900. From 1912 to 1916, Howard was a staff officer. He served in the First World War; from 1916, he commanded the 16th King's Royal Rifles, was injured and received the Distinguished Service Order in 1917 and received a bar to the DSO in 1918. He was promoted to colonel in 1923 and from 1929 to 1932 he commanded the 162nd (East Midland) Brigade; from 1932 to 1935, he then commanded the 12th Infantry Brigade and Dover Garrison, and received the freedom of the Borough of Dover on relinquishing his command. He retired from the Army in 1936 and was promoted to the honorary rank of brigadier.

In 1935, George V appointed Howard to the office of Serjeant-at-Arms of the House of Commons, which had previously been held by Admiral Sir Colin Keppel. Howard built a reputation for upholding traditions and was well-regarded for having a "genial personality". He was appointed a Knight Commander of the Royal Victorian Order in 1944 and promoted to Knight Grand Cross in 1957, the year after he retired from his office.

== Retirement and personal life ==
Howard died on 5 January 1958. In 1908, he had married Miriam Eleanore Dansey, daughter of Lieutenant-Colonel Edward Mashiter Dansey and his wife the Hon. Eleanor Gifford, daughter of Robert Gifford, 2nd Baron Gifford; (Note: Miriam Dansey's brother was thus the intelligence officer Sir Claude Dansey.) she died in 1969. They had two children, a daughter Diana who died young, and a son Henry Redvers Greville Howard (1911–1978), an army officer and the father of Greville Howard, Baron Howard of Rising.

Government offices
Preceded by Sir Colin Keppel	Serjeant-at-Arms of the House of Commons; 1935–1957	Succeeded by Sir Ivor Hughes
