= James Norfolk =

Sir James Norfolk (died 1680) was Serjeant-at-Arms to the Speaker of the House of Commons of England during the reign of Charles II.

== Biography ==
In 1656 Norfolk purchased Colchester Castle from Charles, Lord Stanhope. On Norfolk's death it passed to his son, who sold it in 1688 to a John Wheely.

Shortly before the return of Charles II to England and the restoration of the monarchy, ignoring those who held letters of patents for the office of Serjeant-at-Arms granted by Charles I, the House of Commons of the Convention Parliament appointed James Norfolk to the office on 25 April 1660.

In January 1661 James Norfolk was instructed by the House to find the bodies of the regicides John Bradshaw, Oliver Cromwell, Henry Ireton and Thomas Pride. He located the first three corpses which were then—on 30 January 1661 (12 years to the day since the execution of Charles I)—subject to a posthumous execution: disinterred, hanged at Tyburn and beheaded. The bodies were thrown into a pit and the heads placed on spikes at the end of Westminster Hall (the building where the trial of Charles I had taken place).

Norfolk was reappointed as Serjeant-at-Arms to the Speaker of the House of Commons in May 1661 with Royal consent.

At the Restoration a new Mace had been commissioned but in 1670 Norfolk reported to the House that the Mace was no longer fit for service, so an order was issued to the Master of the Jewel House to have a new one made for the Serjeant-at-Arms' use.

On 2 June 1675 the Speaker of the House of Commons ordered that Norfolk be apprehended and sent to the Tower of London for failure to carry out wishes of the House of Commons. However, he could not be found. His disappearance coincided with a dispute between the House of Commons and the House of Lords. The Commons had ordered Sergeant Norfolk to detain certain people overnight so that they could be brought to the bar of the House of Commons for questioning. Black Rod was ordered by the House of Lords to free the men. Black Rod had carried out his orders while Norfolk had failed to carry out his.

Norfolk died and was buried in the churchyard at Romford Chapel on 18 November 1680.

== Family ==
James Norfolk had several children:

- John (died 1675)
- Martha married Hope Gifford, Councillor-at-Law of Colchester

== Notes ==
Government offices
Preceded by Edward Birkhead	Serjeant-at-Arms of the House of Commons of England; 1660–1665	Succeeded by William Bishop
