= Gossett =

Gossett is the name of:

- Bruce Gossett (born 1941), American football placekicker
- Charles C. Gossett (1888–1974), American politician
- Colby Gossett (born 1995), American football player
- Daniel Gossett (born 1992), American baseball player
- David Gossett (born 1979), American golfer
- Dylan Gossett (born 1999), American country singer-songwriter
- Ed Gossett (1902–1990), American politician
- Elizabeth Hughes Gossett (1907–1981), American woman, one of the first humans injected with insulin
- Hattie Gossett (born 1942), African-American playwright, poet, and magazine editor
- Jeff Gossett (born 1957), American football punter
- Larry Gossett (born 1945), American politician
- Louis Gossett Jr. (1936–2024), American actor
- O. Milton Gossett (1925–2006), American advertising executive
- Philip Gossett (1941–2017), American musicologist and historian
- Robert Gossett (born 1954), American actor

== See also ==
- Gosset (surname)
