= Ugbana Oyet =

British engineer and serjeant-at-arms

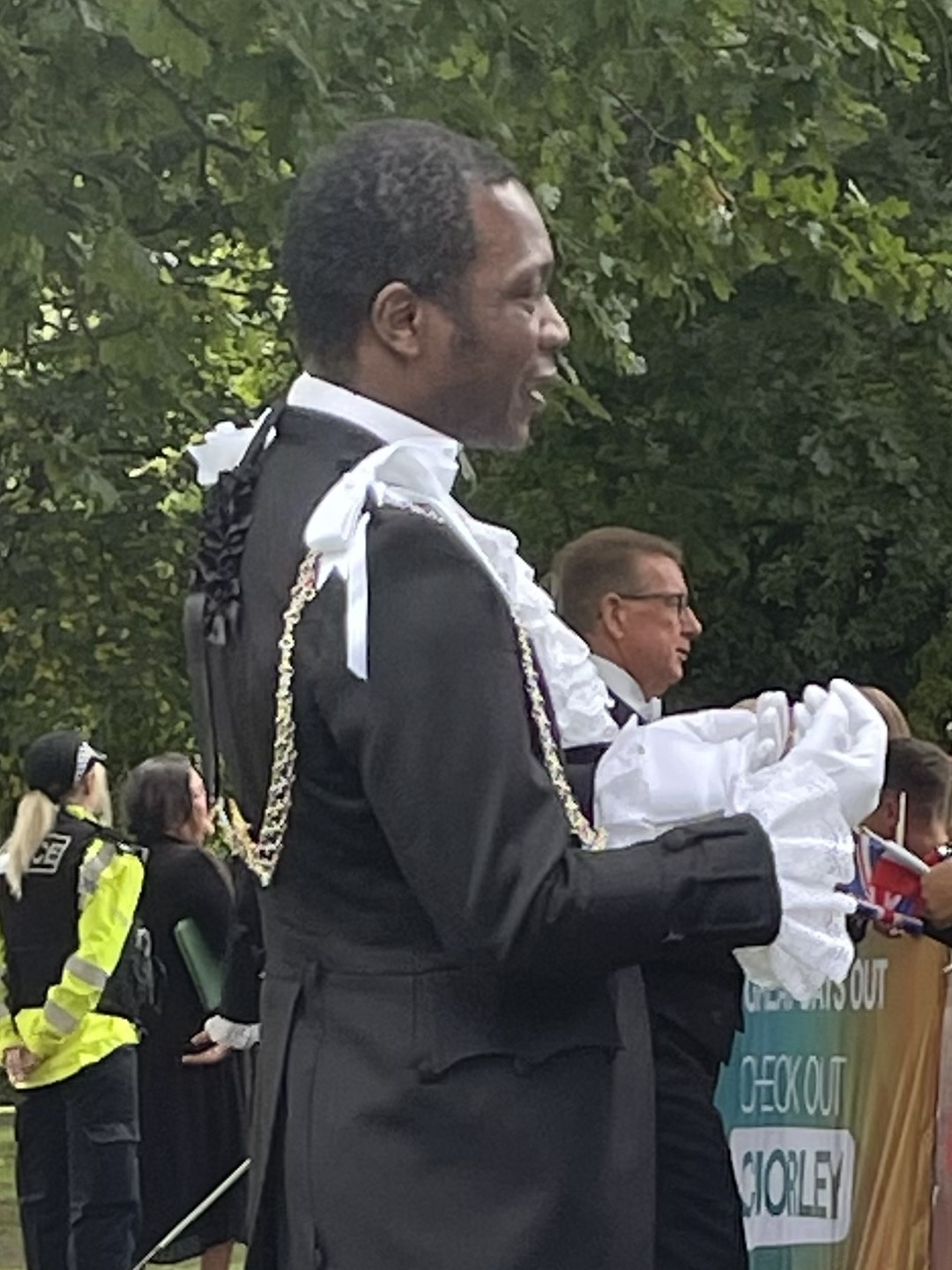
- Oyet in 2021

Serjeant at Arms of the House of Commons
- Incumbent
- Assumed office October 2019
- Speaker: John Bercow; Lindsay Hoyle
- Preceded by: Kamal El-Hajji

Personal details
- Born: September 1976 (age 50) Calabar, Cross River State, Nigeria
- Education: University of Southampton

Ugbana Oyet (born September 1976) is a Nigerian-born British chartered engineer and the current Serjeant-at-Arms of the House of Commons. Oyet is the first black Serjeant-at-Arms.

== Early life ==
Oyet was born in Nigeria in 1976 and moved to the United Kingdom with his family in 1991.

Oyet was educated in Chichester, West Sussex. It was whilst at school in Chichester that he met Claire, his future wife.

Oyet attended the University of Southampton, studying electrical engineering.

== Career ==
Oyet began working at Parliament in 2012 as Parliament's Principal Electrical Engineer and led efforts to make the parliamentary estate carbon neutral by 2050 before his appointment as Serjeant-at-Arms.

Oyet was appointed as Serjeant-at-Arms in October 2019.

== Personal life ==
He is married to Claire. They have four children, three sons and a daughter.

Government offices
Preceded by Kamal El-Hajji	Serjeant-at-Arms of the House of Commons; 2019–present	Incumbent
