= Skipjack =

Skipjack may refer to:

== Zoology ==
- Skipjack tuna, a fish of the family Scombridae
- A common name for Elateridae (click beetles)
- Skipjack shad, the fish species, Alosa chrysochloris
- Common name for Pseudocaranx georgianus, also known as silver trevally or skippy.

== Maritime ==
- Skipjack 15, an American sailing dinghy design
- HMS Skipjack, Royal Navy, Halcyon class minesweeper, sunk by bombs in 1940
- Skipjack (boat), a type of fishing boat used on the Chesapeake Bay, USA
- USS Skipjack, the name of three United States Navy submarines
- Skipjack class submarine, a class of United States Navy nuclear submarines

== In computing ==
- Skipjack (cipher), a block cipher, designed by the US National Security Agency
- Skipjack, the code name for Linspire 6.0, a Linux distribution
- Skipjack, the code name for the VAX 8550 computer system, introduced by Digital Equipment Corporation in 1986

== Other ==
- Baltimore Skipjacks, former professional ice hockey team
- Skipjack Wind Farm, Offshore Delaware
