= Serjeant at Arms of the House of Commons =

Parliamentary official responsible for order in the House of Commons

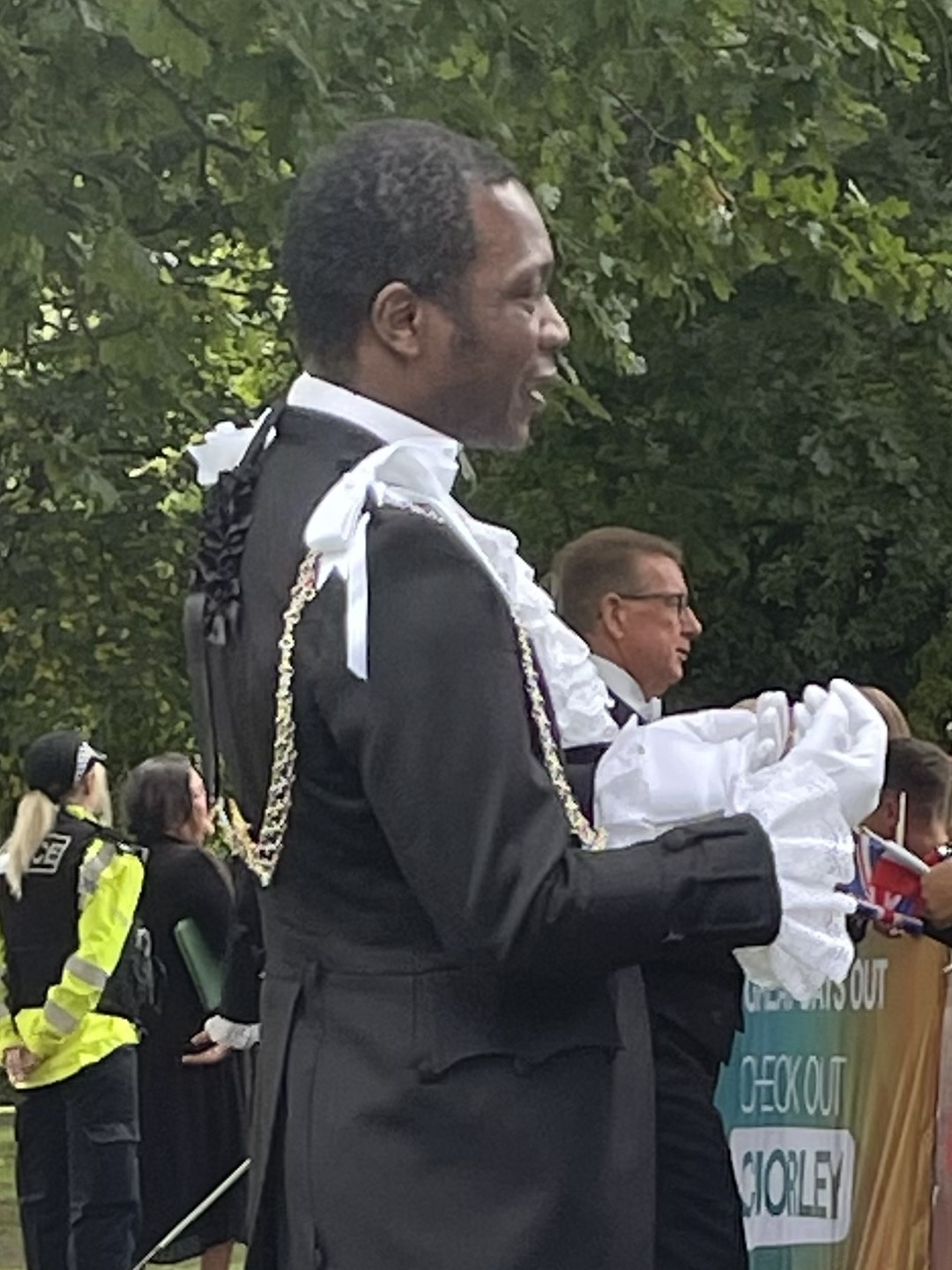
- Incumbent; Ugbana Oyet since October 2019
- Parliament of the United Kingdom
- Appointer: The Crown
- Formation: 1415
- First holder: Nicholas Maundit
- Website: UK Parliament: Serjeant at Arms

The Serjeant at Arms of the House of Commons is an official of the House of Commons of the United Kingdom, whose office dates back to 1415. The Serjeant at Arms is responsible for keeping order within the Commons (and associated parts of the parliamentary estate); there are also ceremonial aspects to the role, and other attached duties. The current office-holder, as of October 2022, is Ugbana Oyet.

== Background ==
The appointment of one Nicholas Maudit to serve as a Serjeant at Arms for the Commons is recorded in 1415 in the Close Rolls of Henry V: "at the special petition of the Commons [...] the King granted that the said Nicholas Maudit should during his life attend upon all his Parliaments [...] as Serjeant at Arms for the Commons coming thereto". The sergeants-at-arms were a body of men, armed with maces, who served as the king's bodyguard; Maudit was one of their number. Their function was both practical and ceremonial. The king's serjeants-at-arms had significant powers of arrest (requiring no writ, the mace alone serving as their warrant). These powers were also available to the Serjeant at Arms of the Commons, to be used as and when directed by the House (as was first demonstrated in the case of George Ferrers in 1545). Later, the 'Speaker's warrant' came to be employed as a means to validate the Serjeant's powers of arrest, enabling the mace to remain in the chamber. (Note: By the end of the seventeenth century it was considered a requirement that the mace always be present when the House was sitting.)

In 1549 the Serjeant at Arms was described as de facto 'Housekeeper of the Commons' and for centuries the offices of Serjeant and Housekeeper were held conjointly. By the seventeenth century the Serjeant was managing a small department, consisting of two doorkeepers, four messengers, the Deputy Housekeeper and assorted other staff. Prior to 1835 it also included the Vote Office. Up until the great fire of 1834, the Deputy Housekeeper held responsibility, under the Serjeant at Arms, for catering in the Palace.

In recent centuries, the Serjeant at Arms of the House of Commons was usually (though not invariably) a retired military officer, but in 2008 a civil servant, Jill Pay, was selected (and was the first woman to hold the appointment). At the same time the job was split, with many of the Serjeant's former duties (including those of the Parliamentary Works Directorate, which oversaw the repair and maintenance of buildings) transferred to a new 'Department of Facilities'.

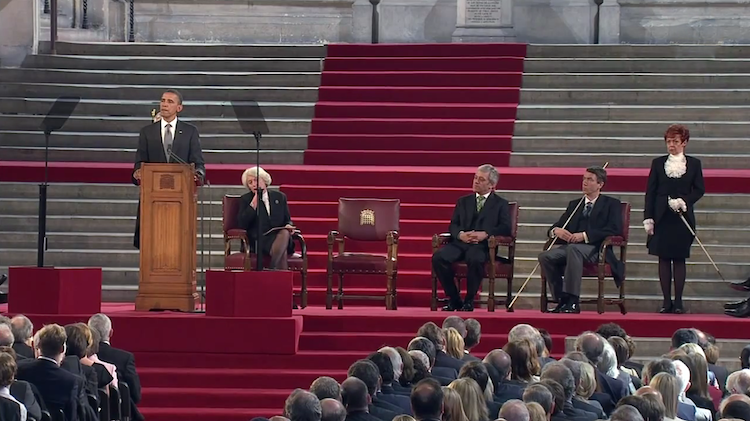
Jill Pay (far right), Serjeant at Arms 2008-2012, attending an address to both Houses by Barack Obama in Westminster Hall, 2011

Traditionally, the Serjeant at Arms ranked second in precedence (after the Clerk of the House of Commons) amongst the permanent offices of the House. A further restructuring, however, led to the appointment in 2015 of a 'Director General of the House of Commons', and as of 2025 the Clerk and the (renamed) 'Director General (Operations)' are listed as the principal permanent staff, while the Serjeant at Arms is part of the 'Chamber and Participation Team' (which is headed by the Clerk Assistant).

=== House of Lords ===
The House of Lords also had a Serjeant-at-Arms (Note: By custom, the 'Serjeant-at-Arms' in the Lords was distinguished from the 'Serjeant at Arms' of the Commons by the use of hyphens.) (technically he was Serjeant-at-Arms to the Lord Chancellor). This office also dated from the 15th century; his duties were merged in 1971 with those of Black Rod.

== Duties ==
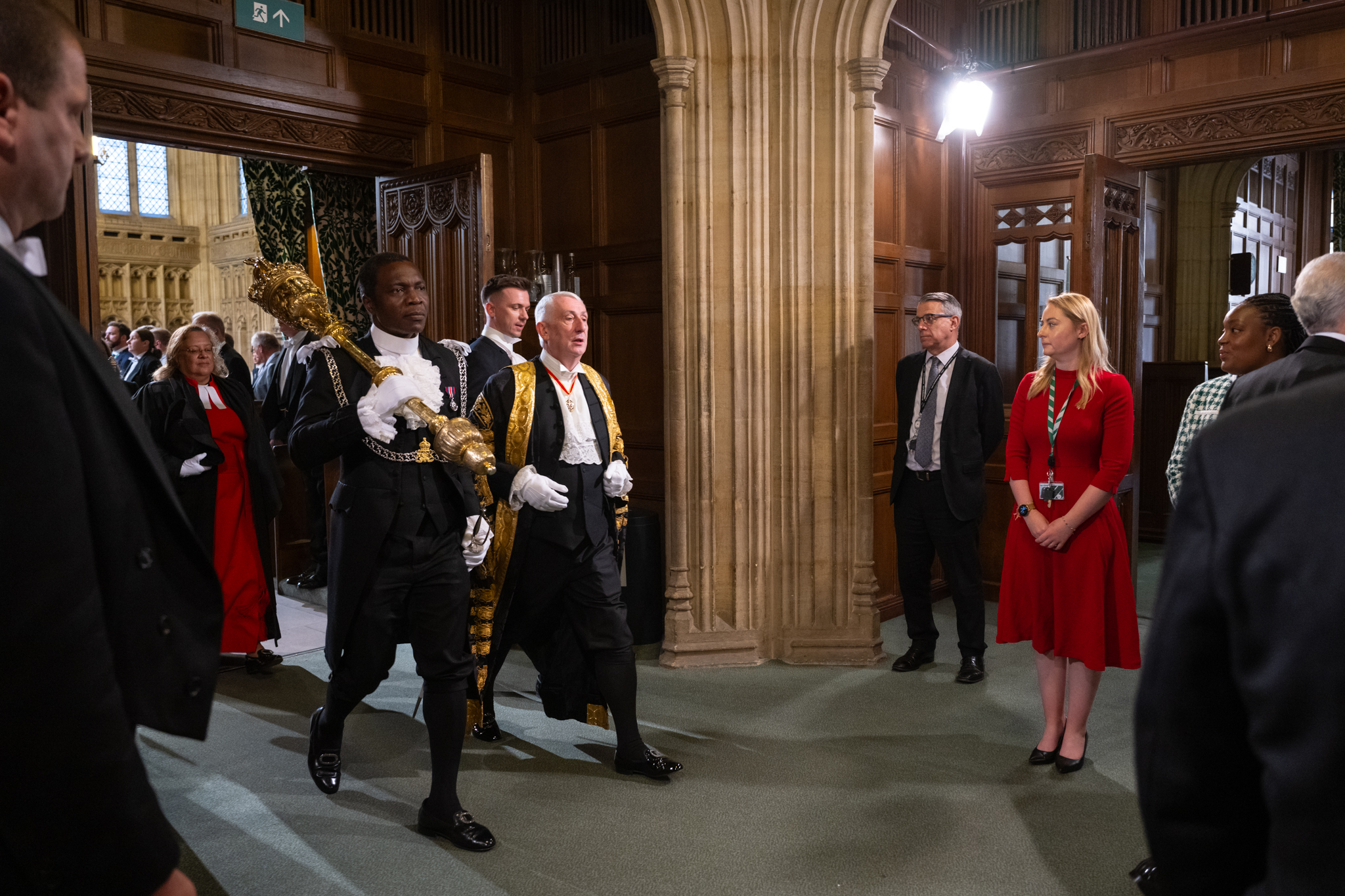
The Serjeant at Arms (left, with mace), alongside the Speaker at the State Opening of Parliament, 2024.

The Serjeant at Arms (or a deputy) is always present in the chamber when the House is sitting, during which time he controls access to the chamber (including the public galleries); he oversees a team of doorkeepers, who assist in this task. The Serjeant at Arms is responsible for maintaining order in the House of Commons, and will escort members out of the chamber if ordered to do so by the Speaker. His authority extends beyond the chamber itself to the committee rooms and to the areas of the Parliamentary Estate which pertain to the House of Commons.

The duties of the Serjeant at Arms are partly ceremonial. The Serjeant at Arms carries the mace before the Speaker at the beginning and end of each day's sitting. At the State Opening of Parliament (and likewise at Prorogation and on certain other occasions), the Serjeant at Arms bars the entry of Black Rod to the chamber of the House of Commons, before admitting him and allowing him forward to speak; the summons having been issued, the Serjeant collects the mace and carries it, ahead of the Speaker and Black Rod, followed by members of the Commons, who then make their way to the Upper House to attend the Speech from the throne (or to hear the monarch's commission).

In rare cases, the Serjeant at Arms may be called upon to enforce the warrants of the Speaker in summoning a witness to testify before a select committee of the house. While serving the warrant and encouraging a witness to attend parliament "the Serjeant or his appointee may call on the full assistance of the civil authorities, including the police." In January 1992, the Serjeant at Arms was employed to summon Ian and Kevin Maxwell, the sons of the disgraced business tycoon Robert Maxwell, to attend an inquiry held by the Social Security Select Committee into the operation of the Mirror Group Pension fund. In 2011, Rupert and James Murdoch were served with a summons by the Assistant Serjeant at Arms, to appear before the Select Committee for Culture, Media and Sport in connection with the phone hacking scandal (having initially indicated that they would not be available); they subsequently attended the hearing. In November 2018, the Serjeant at Arms was called upon to escort an American businessman, who was staying in London, to the Houses of Parliament because he had documents pertaining to the Facebook–Cambridge Analytica data scandal. After being told he could face arrest, fines and imprisonment for failing to comply with a parliamentary order to hand over the documents, the man eventually complied with the request.

The Serjeant at Arms sits on various committees and is involved in the planning of special events. At the start of each sitting day he attends a conference with the Speaker, deputy speakers and senior Clerks to discuss the order of proceedings for the day and any other relevant matters.

== Dress ==
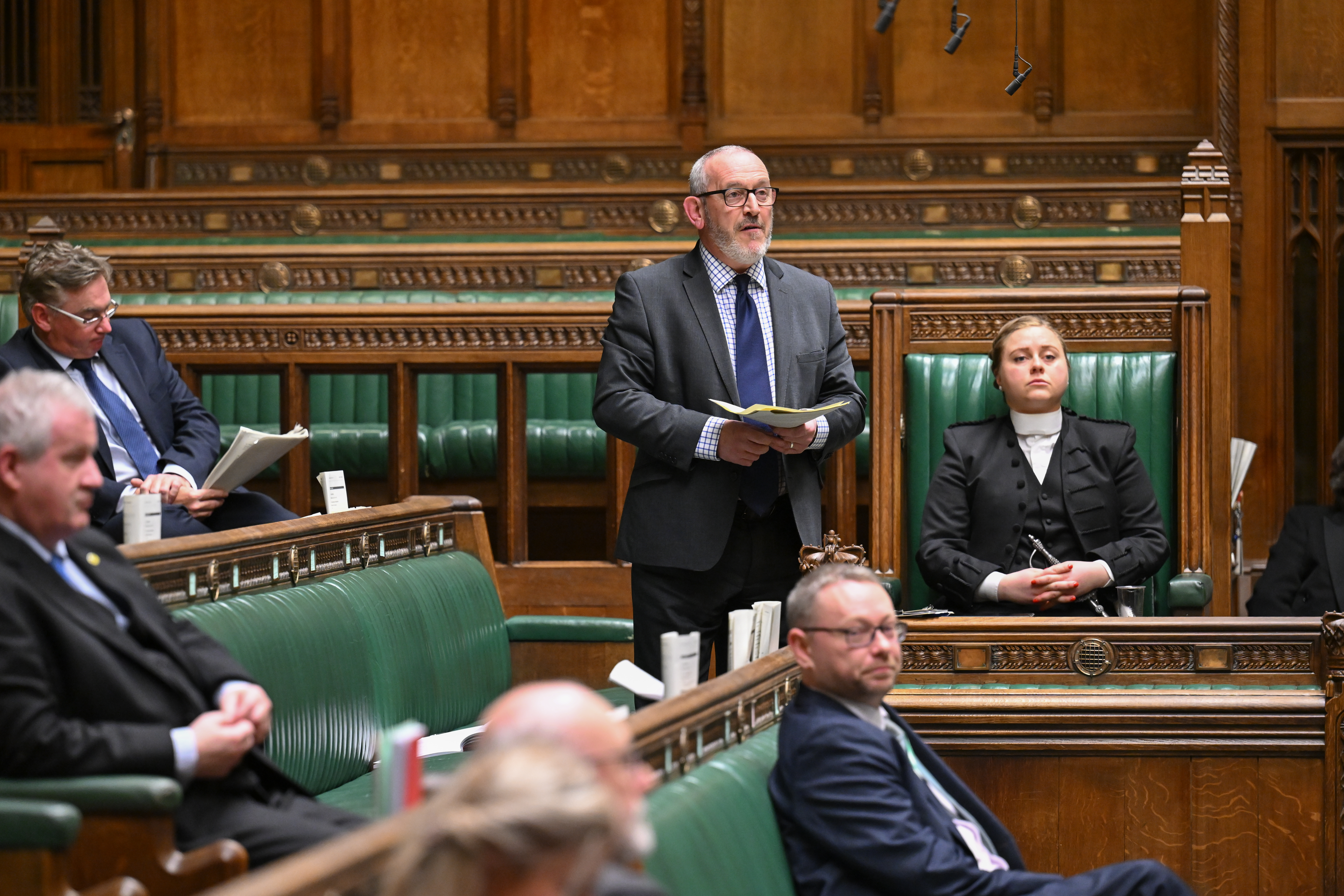
A deputy serjeant at arms (right) on duty in the Commons chamber during a debate.

When on duty, attending the Speaker and in the chamber, the Serjeant at Arms wears court dress and carries a sword, as do his deputies. On state occasions (such as the State Opening of Parliament) they wear, in addition, a lace frill and ruffles (at the collar and cuffs) and (in the case of the Serjeant) a distinctive collar of esses. The Serjeant (or his deputy) is by tradition the only person allowed to be armed (with sword or mace) within the chamber of the House of Commons.

== List of Serjeants at Arms ==
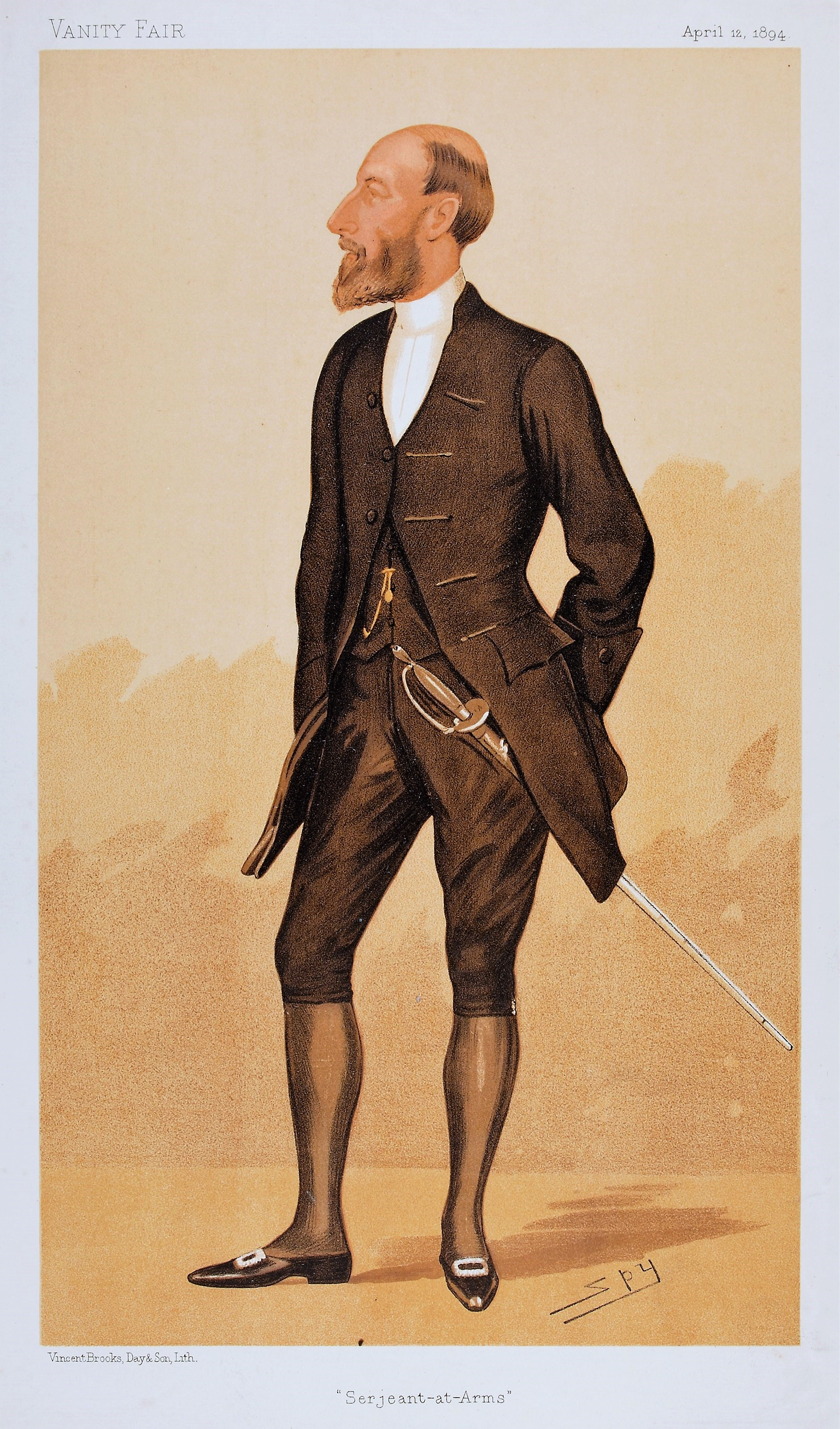
Sir David Erskine, Serjeant at Arms from 1885 to 1915. (Caricature by 'Spy', 1894).

- 1415-1417? Nicholas Maundit
- 1461?-1471 John Bury
- July-October 1471 Maurice Gethyn
- 1471-1472 Robert Siddale
- 1472-1485 Nicolas Brytte
- 1485-1517 John Harper
- 1517 John Smythe
- 1533-1555 John St John
- 1555-1575? Thomas Hale
- 1576-1590 Ralph Bowyer
- 1590-1610 Roger Wood
- 1610-1640 Edward Grimeston
- 1640-1646 John Hunt
- c.1645: Edward Dendy Junior
- 1646–1660: Edward Birkhead
- 1660–1675: Sir James Norfolk
- 1675–1693: Sir William Bishop
- 1693–1709: Samuel Powell
- 1709–1717: Thomas Wybergh
- 1717–1737: Thomas Spence
- 1737–1762: Wentworth Odiarne
- 1762–1775: Nicholas Bonfoy
- 1775–1805: Edward Colman
- 1805–1811: Francis John Colman
- 1812–1812: John Clementson
- 1812–1835: Henry Seymour
- 1835–1848: Sir William Gosset
- 1848–1875: Lord Charles Russell
- 1875–1885: Sir Ralph Gosset
- 1885–1915: Sir David Erskine
- 1915–1935: Sir Colin Richard Keppel
- 1935–1957: Sir Charles Howard
- 1957–1962: Sir Ivor Hughes
- 1962–1976: Sir Alexander Gordon-Lennox
- 1976–1982: Sir Peter Francis Thorne
- 1982–1989: Sir Victor Le Fanu
- 1989–1995: Sir Alan Urwick
- 1995–1999: Sir Peter Jennings
- 2000–2005: Sir Michael Cummins
- 2005–2007: Peter Grant Peterkin
- 2008–2012: Jill Pay
- 2012–2015: Lawrence Ward
- 2015–2019: Kamal El-Hajji
- 2019–present: Ugbana Oyet

== See also ==
- Serjeant-at-Arms
