= Kamal El-Hajji =

House of Commons' Serjeant at Arms

Kamal El-Hajji BEM

Serjeant at Arms of the House of Commons
- In office 1 February 2016 – 31 July 2019
- Speaker: John Bercow
- Preceded by: Lawrence Ward
- Succeeded by: Ugbana Oyet

Personal details
- Born: Mohammed Amal El-Hajji; 1958 or 1959 (age 66–67) Essaouira, Morocco

Mohammed Amal El-Hajji, BEM, known as Kamal El-Hajji, is a British Security Official and civil servant. From February 2016 to 2019 he was the Serjeant at Arms of the House of Commons, replacing Lawrence Ward. He had formerly been the Head of Front of House and VIP Relations at the Ministry of Justice headquarters, based at 102 Petty France.

== Career ==
Since 2004, El-Hajji held a number of security and operational roles in the Department for Constitutional Affairs, and later the Ministry of Justice. From 2010 to 2015, he worked as the Head of Front of House and VIP Relations at the Ministry of Justice headquarters at 102 Petty France in London.

In 2015, El-Hajji was chosen by a panel of MPs headed by the Speaker of the House of Commons, John Bercow, to replace Lawrence Ward, who had retired in September 2015, as the next Serjeant-at-Arms of the House of Commons.

== Honours ==
In the 2015 New Year Honours, El-Hajji was awarded the British Empire Medal (BEM) "for services to the Ministry of Justice"

Government offices
Preceded by Lawrence Ward	Serjeant-at-Arms of the House of Commons; 2015–2019	Succeeded by Ugbana Oyet
