= Peter Grant Peterkin =

British Army general and Serjeant at Arms

Major General Peter Grant Peterkin CB OBE

Serjeant-at-Arms of the British House of Commons
- In office 31 December 2004 – 24 June 2007
- Speaker: Michael Martin
- Preceded by: Sir Michael Cummins
- Succeeded by: Jill Pay

Personal details
- Born: 6 July 1947 (age 79)
- Education: Ampleforth College; Durham University

Military service
- Allegiance: United Kingdom
- Branch/service: British Army
- Years of service: 1967–2004
- Rank: Major General
- Commands: 5th Division; 24th Airmobile Brigade
- Battles/wars: Kosovo War
- Awards: Companion of the Order of the Bath; Officer of the Order of the British Empire

Major General Anthony Peter Grant Peterkin, CB, OBE (born 6 July 1947) is a retired senior British Army officer. He was the British House of Commons' Serjeant at Arms between 2004 and 2007.

== Early life ==
Grant Peterkin was born on 6 July 1947. He is the son of Brigadier James Grant Peterkin and his wife Dorothea Grant Peterkin.

He was educated at Ampleforth College in Ampleforth, North Yorkshire.

== Military career ==
Having graduated from the Royal Military Academy Sandhurst, Grant Peterkin was commissioned into the Queen's Own Highlanders on 28 July 1967 as a second lieutenant. He was given the service number 483916. In 1968, he was selected for an in-service degree and began studying history at Durham University. He was promoted to lieutenant on 28 January 1969. He was a member of Hatfield College during his studies, and graduated from Durham with a Bachelor of Arts in 1971. He was promoted to captain on 28 July 1973, and then served as aide-de-camp to the Chief of the General Staff, General Sir Peter Hunt. He was promoted to major on 31 December 1979, and then attended the Indian Staff College in 1980. Following this experience he rejoined the 1st Battalion of the Queen's Own Highlanders in Hong Kong and later took them to the Falkland Islands in the aftermath of the Falklands War.

After a posting at the Ministry of Defence, Grant Peterkin attended the Australian Joint Services Staff College in 1986, and was promoted to lieutenant colonel on 31 December 1986 with seniority in that rank from 30 June 1986. He was appointed commanding officer of the 1st Battalion, Queen's Own Highlanders in 1987. Then, from 1989 to 1991, he was Military Assistant to the Military Secretary. Grant Peterkin was appointed an Officer of the Order of the British Empire in the 1991 New Year Honours and, in the aftermath of the Gulf War, he joined the United Nations Iraq–Kuwait Observation Mission, heading the British contingent of border observers. He was appointed commander of the 24th Airmobile Brigade in 1993, and then became Deputy Military Secretary in 1996.

In 1999 Grant Peterkin went on a mission, arranged by the Organization for Security and Co-operation in Europe, to Kosovo and then later that year he was appointed the senior Army representative at the Royal College of Defence Studies. In October 1999 he became General Officer Commanding 5th Division. He became Military Secretary in 2000 before retiring in 2004. He was appointed a Companion of the Order of the Bath in the 2003 New Year Honours.

== Later life ==
Grant Peterkin was appointed Serjeant at Arms in 2004. His contract was not renewed in 2007 after suggestions of a falling out with Michael Martin, the Speaker of the House of Commons.

== Personal life ==
In 1974, Grant Peterkin married Joanna Young, daughter of Sir Brian Young. Together, they have had two children; one son and one daughter and now three grandchildren .

Military offices
Preceded by Robin Searby	General Officer Commanding 5th Division; 1999–2000	Succeeded by Arthur Denaro
Preceded by Alistair Irwin	Military Secretary; 2000–2003	Succeeded by Freddie Viggers
Parliament of the United Kingdom
Preceded by Sir Michael Cummins	Serjeant at Arms of the British House of Commons; 2004–2007	Succeeded by Jill Pay
