= Edward Dendy (regicide) =

English regicide

Edward Dendy (bap. 1613 – 1674) was an English regicide who helped to facilitate the trial of Charles I.

Dendy was the son of Edward Dendy, serjeant-at-arms. Dendy inherited his father's position and served as serjeant-at-arms in the Long Parliament and for the Rump. On 8 January 1649 Dendy as serjeant-at-arms for the Rump Parliament proclaimed that the trial of Charles I would take place in London, and was rewarded on 27 March the same year with the post of serjeant-at-arms for the Council of State.

During the Interregnum he served the new regime in various roles and it was he who proclaimed Oliver Cromwell as protector in London on 19 December 1653.

In 1660, at the restoration of the monarchy he was excluded from the general pardon granted under the Act of Oblivion and fled abroad. In 1661, he left Rotterdam before the English ambassador George Downing could arrange for an arrest warrant to be issued. He moved to Switzerland to be with other republican fugitives. He remained there, settling in Lausanne where he died in 1674.

== Notes ==
Government offices
Preceded by Edward Dendy Sr.	Serjeant-at-Arms of the House of Commons of England c. 1645	Succeeded by Edward Birkhead
