= HMS Skipjack =

HMS Skipjack is the name of the following Royal Navy ships:

- HMS Skipjack (1806), a captured French schooner
- HMS Skipjack (1808), a captured French schooner
- HMS Skipjack (1889), a Sharpshooter-class torpedo gunboat
- HMS Skipjack (J300), an Algerine-class minesweeper

== See also ==
- Skipjack (disambiguation)
