= Peter Jennings (serjeant-at-arms) =

British Serjeant-at-Arms

Sir Peter Nevile Wake Jennings, CVO (born 19 August 1934) is a retired British public servant, who served as Serjeant-at-Arms of the House of Commons from 1995 to 1999. Before joining the staff of House of Commons in 1976, he was an officer in the Royal Marines.

== Career ==
Jennings was commissioned into the Royal Marines as a second lieutenant on 1 November 1952. He was made an acting lieutenant on 20 April 1954, and promoted to lieutenant on 1 May 1956 (with seniority in that rank from 1 February 1956). He was made a local lieutenant colonel on 29 June 1974, and relinquished the rank on 1 August 1976. He retired from the Royal Marines on 29 November 1976 with the rank of major.

In 1976, Jennings joined the staff of the House of Commons as a deputy assistant. From 1995 to 1999, he served as the Serjeant-at-Arms, the parliamentary official responsible for order in the House of Commons.

In retirement, Jennings was Chairman of the St Martin-in-the-Fields Almshouse Charity (2004–2010), the Bowles Outdoor Centre (2004–2010), and the English-Speaking Union (2014–2015).

== Honours ==
In the 1999 New Year Honours, Jennings was appointed Commander of the Royal Victorian Order (CVO) in recognition of his service as Serjeant-at-Arms. In the 2000 New Year Honours, he was appointed a Knight Bachelor following his retirement as Serjeant-at-Arms, and therefore granted the title sir.

Parliament of the United Kingdom
Preceded by Sir Alan Urwick	Serjeant-at-Arms of the House of Commons; 1995–1999	Succeeded by Sir Michael Cummins
