= Michael Cummins (serjeant-at-arms) =

British parliamentary official (1939–2020)

Sir Michael Cummins

37th Serjeant-at-Arms of the House of Commons
- In office 2000–2005
- Monarch: Elizabeth II
- Preceded by: Sir Peter Jennings
- Succeeded by: Peter Grant Peterkin

Personal details
- Born: Michael John Austin Cummins; 26 November 1939 Basingstoke, Hampshire, United Kingdom
- Died: 25 January 2020 (aged 80)
- Education: Royal Military Academy Sandhurst

Military service
- Allegiance: United Kingdom
- Branch/service: British Army

Sir Michael John Austin Cummins (26 November 1939 – 25 January 2020) was a British parliamentary official. He was the Serjeant-at-Arms of the British House of Commons between 2000 and 2005. He was knighted in the 2003 Birthday Honours.

He had joined the House of Commons in 1981 as a Deputy Assistant Serjeant at Arms, becoming Assistant Serjeant the following year and Deputy Serjeant at Arms in 1995. Prior to this, he had served 24 years in the Royal Scots Dragoon Guards, including operational tours in Northern Ireland, from which he retired with the rank of lieutenant-colonel.

Parliament of the United Kingdom
Preceded by Sir Peter Jennings	Serjeant-at-Arms of the House of Commons; 2000–2005	Succeeded by Peter Grant Peterkin
