= USS Skipjack =

USS Skipjack has been the name of more than one United States Navy ship named after the skipjack tuna, and may refer to:

- USS Skipjack (Submarine No. 24), the original name of a submarine renamed USS E-1 (SS-24) while under construction in 1911 and in commission from 1912 to 1921
- USS Skipjack (SS-184), a submarine in commission from 1938 to 1946
- USS Skipjack (SSN-585), a submarine in commission from 1959 to 1990
