= Isaac Gosset (bibliographer) =

Isaac Henry Gosset
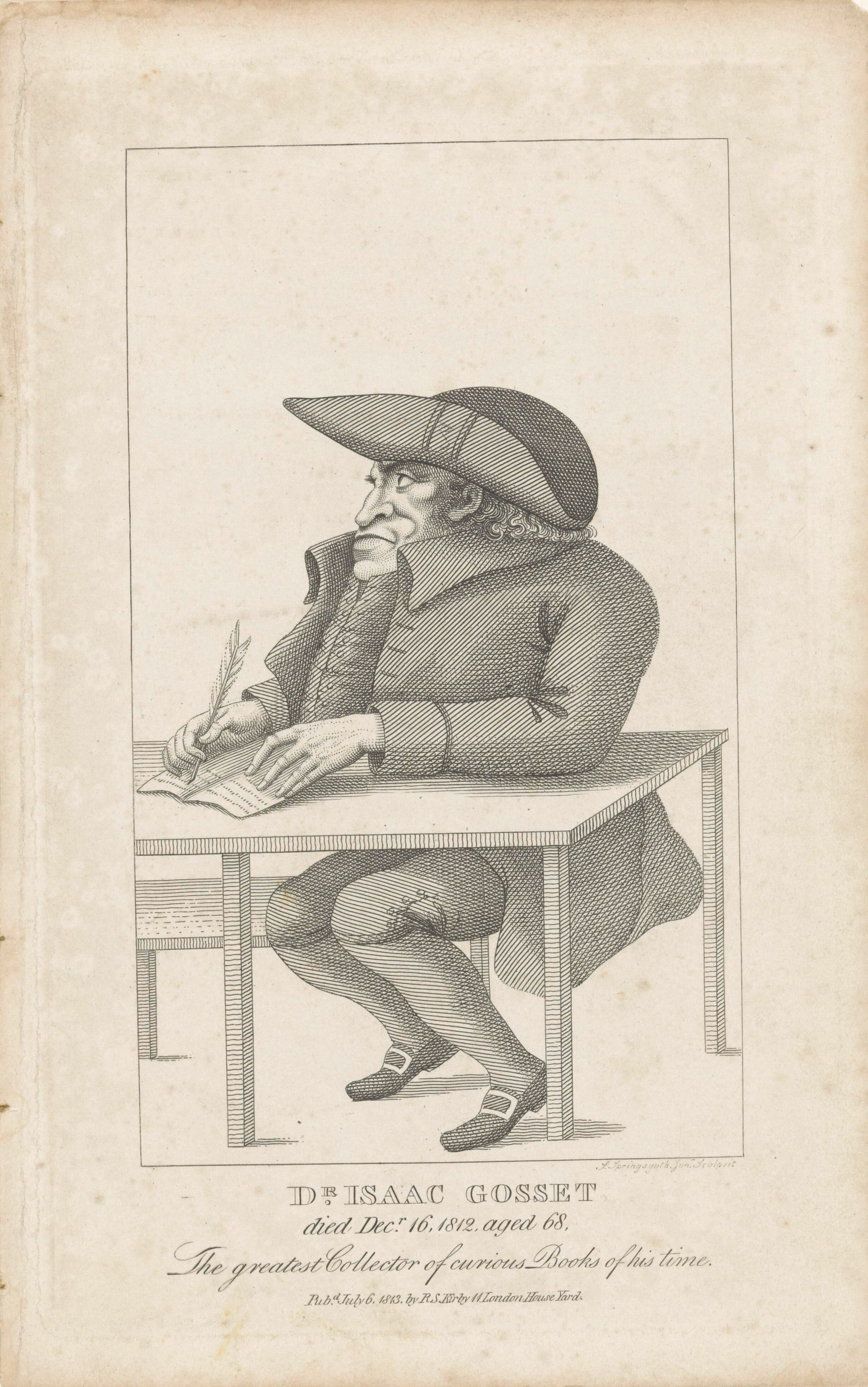
- Caricature by S. Springsguth
- Born: 1745
- Died: 16 December 1812
- Occupation: Bibliographer

Isaac Henry Gosset FRS (c.1735/1745–1812) was an English bibliographer, elected a Fellow of the Royal Society on 18 June 1772.

== Life ==
Born in Berwick Street, Soho, London, in 1735 or 1736, he was the only son of the sculptor Isaac Gosset (1713-1799). After attending Dr. Walker's academy at Mile End, he matriculated at Exeter College, Oxford, 25 February 1764. He graduated B.A. 10 October 1767, M.A. 27 June 1770, and went out grand compounder for the degrees in divinity 7 November 1782.

Gosset was short of stature and suffered from poor health. He was also deformed in a way that exposed him to abuse, and was not able to make a career. He became a character to whom anecdotes attached, and in literature. He did preach charity sermons, and some of his biblical criticism survived him.

== Book collector ==
While still young, Gosset collected books, especially early classics, grammars, and theological works. In London auction rooms he was subjected to gibes of his from Michael Lort, and ridiculed for his impatience during bidding. He regarded Richard Heber as his pupil in book-hunting. He helped Thomas Frognall Dibdin in preparing the second edition of his Introduction to the Classics.

== Death ==
Gosset died suddenly in Newman Street, London, 12 December 1812, at age 67, and was buried with his family in Old Marylebone cemetery. His library was sold by Leigh & Sotheby over three weeks during June 1813. Stephen Weston lamented the loss to bibliography in The Tears of the Booksellers, published the year after his death in the Gentleman's Magazine.

== Family ==
By his marriage on 9 January 1782 to Miss C. Hill of Newman Street, Gosset had two sons and a daughter. His elder son, Isaac Gosset (1782–1855), was chaplain to the royal household at Windsor under four sovereigns. His younger son, Thomas Stephen Gosset (1791–1847), a senior fellow of Trinity College, Cambridge, became vicar of Old Windsor in 1824.
