= Ralph Gosset =

Scottish military officer and Serjeant at Arms of the House of Commons

Sir Ralph Allen Gosset KCB (28 August 1809 – 27 November 1885) was a British civil servant who was Serjeant at Arms of the House of Commons from 1875–85. He spent nearly 50 years in the service of Parliament.

Gosset was born in Truro, Cornwall, the son of Sir William Gosset and Gertrude Martha Daniell. His father was born in Jersey of French Huguenot descent. Sir William held the post of Serjeant-at-Arms from 1835 until his death in 1848.

Gosset began his career in the Royal Navy. In 1836, he was appointed Assistant Serjeant-at-Arms by his father and in 1854 was promoted to be Deputy- Serjeant. He held this role for 21 years until Queen Victoria appointed him to the vacant position of Serjeant-at-Arms in April 1875.

He announced his retirement in July 1885. The Queen rewarded his nearly 50 years of service by appointing him a Knight Commander of the Order of the Bath.

He died at The Wick, Richmond Hill, London, of lung congestion, after several months of illness. He was buried at Richmond Old Burial Ground.

After his death he was mourned for his gentlemanly manner: "His unfailing courtesy and genial kindness endeared him to all with whom he came in contact, and his punctual and diligent discharge of public duty formed but the foundation of innumerable and cordial personal friendships. In quiet times the Sergeant-at-Arms does not come much into the view of the public, but during recent years he has not infrequently been compelled to take a prominent part in the "scenes" of which the House of Commons has been the theatre."

Lady Gossett died in 1901.

== Personal life ==
In 1835, Sir Ralph married Arabella Sarah Butler of Ballin Temple House, County Carlow, daughter of Sir Thomas Butler, 8th Baronet of Cloughgrenan. They had five sons:

- William Butler Gosset (1836–1906), married Alice, daughter of Robert Cooper Lee Bevan
- Matthew John Alfred Gosset (1837–1921), married Mary Constance Burton of Cherry Burton
- Maj. Henry Allen Gosset (1840–1867), Paymaster of the 75th Foot, died at the Palace of Westminster
- Ralph Gosset (born 1845), died in childhood
- Francis Russell Gosset (1849–1930), Deputy Serjeant-at-Arms, married Mary Snell Dalglish, daughter of Robert Dalglish of Kilmardinny House

Government offices
Preceded by Lord Charles Russell	Serjeant-at-Arms of the House of Commons; 1875–1885	Succeeded by Sir David Erksine
