= Gosset (cartoonist) =

Spanish comics artist (1933–2018)

- Born: Jordi Goset i Rubio; 6 May 1933 Catalonia
- Died: 30 June 2018 (aged 85) Barcelona, Spain
- Areas: comics artist and writer
- Notable works: "Hug, el Troglodita"

Jorge or Jordi Goset i Rubio (6 May 1933 – 30 June 2018), better known as Gosset, was a Spanish cartoonist.

== Biography ==
Gosset was hired by publisher Editorial Bruguera in 1957 to draw jokes for Can Can magazine and the strip "Les Presentamos a Berta, que siempre sueña despierta", written by Armando Matías Guiu, for the magazine Selecciones de Humor de El DDT.

In the 1960s, he created for El DDT his most successful series: "Hug, el Troglodita (1965) about a simple-minded caveman who is always unsuccessfully trying to catch dinosaurs to eat; "Facundo da la vuelta al mundo" (1966) about the comic misadventures of a salakot-wearing wannabe adventurer who travels around the world; and "Domingón" (1967) about an average man who keeps unsuccessfully trying to enjoy his Sundays.

In the 1970s, he created "Roquita", which was set in the same world as "Hug, el Troglodita", for the magazine Super Zipi y Zape and "Carpeto Veto", about a reactionary short man dressed completely in black who despises all modern things.

After the closure of Bruguera in 1986, he published "Burrus and Sapiens" for the magazine Garibolo.

== Bibliography ==
- Cuadrado, Jesús (2000). Atlas español de la cultura popular: De la historieta y su uso 1873–2000. Madrid, Spain: Ediciones Sins Entido. ISBN 84-89384-23-1.
- Guiral, Antoni (2007). Los tebeos de nuestra infancia: La Escuela Bruguera (1964–1986). Colección Magnum nº 7. Barcelona, Spain: Ediciones El Jueves, S. A. ISBN 978-84-9741-589-7. B-50353-2007.
