= Isaac Gosset (sculptor) =

British sculptor (1713–1799)

Isaac Henry Gosset (1713–1799) was an 18th-century sculptor and wax-modeller.

== Life ==
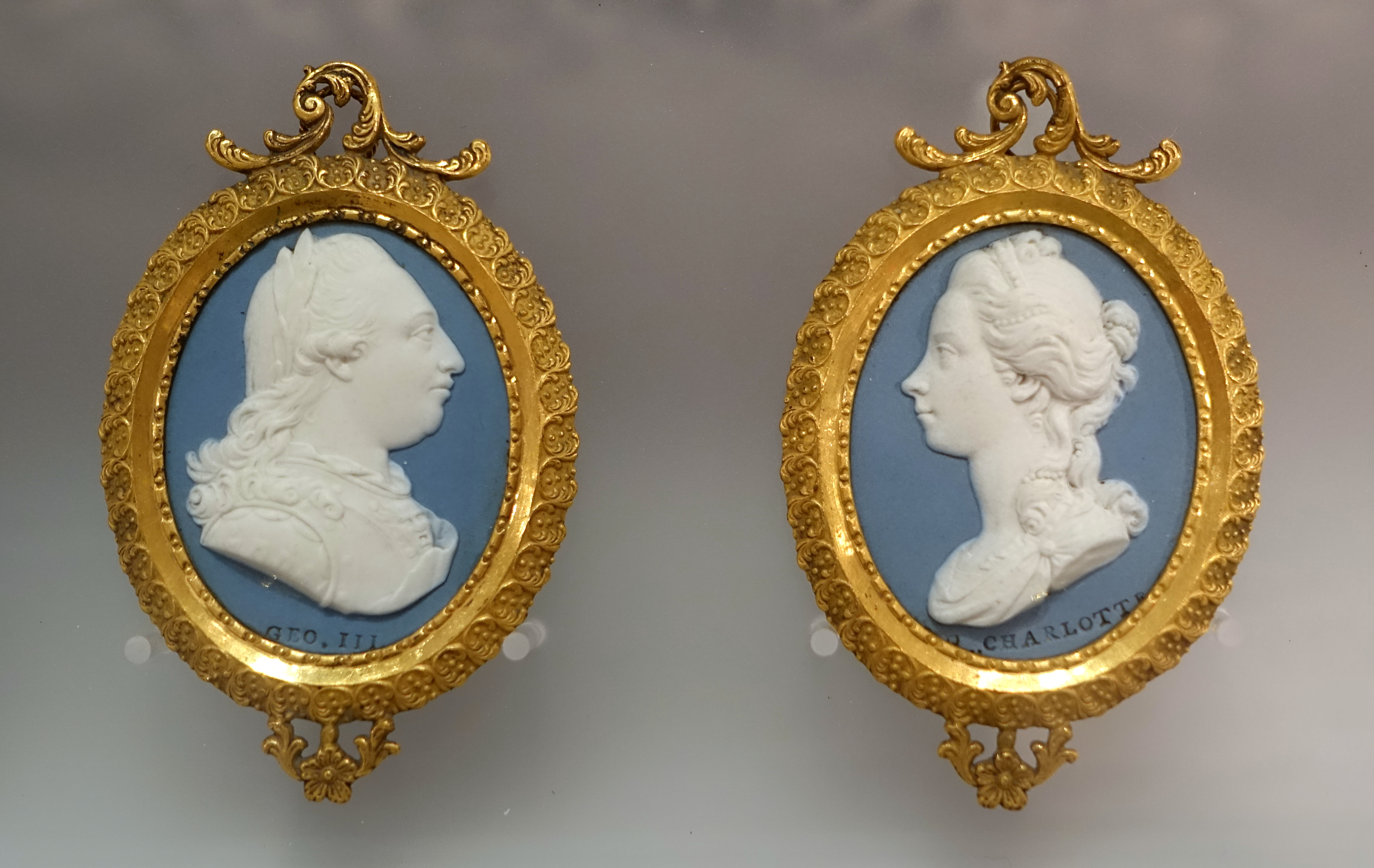
George III and Queen Charlotte, modelled by William Hackwood after original waxes by Isaac Gosset, frames by Matthew Boulton - Wedgwood Museum

He was born in St Helier on the Isle of Jersey on 2 May 1713, the sixth son of Jean Gosset. His parents had fled from Normandy around 1700 after the revocation of the Edict of Nantes. These incomers were known as Huguenots. He was sent to London to train with his elder brother Gideon Gosset under their paternal uncle, Matthew Gosset (1683-1744), a wax-modeller and frame-carver, and member of the Spalding Society. The Gosset company supplied frames to William Hogarth and Thomas Gainsborough. The wax used was of his own recipe and was highly praised in his field.

He exhibited at the Society of Arts (which linked to the Incorporated Society of Artists) and Free Society from 1760 to 1778. Josiah Wedgwood also contracted him as a modeller to produce cameos. Henry Hoare was a huge fan of his works and collected a substantial number from 1753 to 1755 which were (and are) displayed at Stourhead.

Horace Walpole also collected his work, which he displayed at Strawberry Hill. However, the greatest accolade is the collection held at Windsor Castle and displayed in the library purchased by King George III around 1765 to 1770.

He died in Kensington on 28 November 1799 and is buried in Old Marylebone Cemetery.

Many of his works are held by the Victoria and Albert Museum.

== Works ==
- Benjamin Hoadly (1756) Stourhead
- Charles Townshend (1756) NPG
- Henry Seymour Conway (1757) NPG
- James Wolfe (1759)
- George Edwards (1763)
- King George III and Queen Charlotte (1776)
- Richard Hurd Bishop of Worcester (dnk)
- Lord Thurlow
- The Duke of York
- Dr Harris
- David Garrick
- General Wolfe
- Gideon Gosset
- Duke of Sussex
- Prince Regent
- Henry Pelham
- George Grenville
- Duke of Grafton
- Lord Bathurst
- Robert Lowth, Bishop of London (c.1778)
- Lord Maynard
- Richard Trevor, Bishop of Durham
- Francis Hutcheson
- Earl of Mansfield
- Mrs Delany (1776)
- George Selwyn
- General Henry Conway
- Thomas Townshend
- Lord Camden
- Sir Jeffery Amherst
- Frederick, Prince of Wales - Stourhead
- Lady Mary Coke Stourhead
- Charles Townshend Stourhead -moved to NPG
- Miss Conyers (1763)
- Miss Palmer (1763)
- Duke of Newcastle
- 4th Earl of Bristol at Ickworth Park
- General Maclean (1779) at Buxted Park
- Robert Carteret, 3rd Earl Granville at Bowood
- Countess of Shelburne (wife of the Prime Minister) at Bowood
- Charles Yorke at Hartlebury Castle
- Richard Hurd, Bishop of Worcester at Hartlebury Castle
- Prince Octavius at Hartlebury Castle
- Fisher Littleton at Hartlebury Castle
- Lord Mansfield at Hartlebury Castle
- Ralph Allen at Hartlebury Castle
- George, Prince of Wales WC
- Ferdinand, Duke of Brunswick WC
- Edward, Duke of York WC
- Frederick, Prince of Wales WC
- Princess Augusta of Saxe-Gotha WC

== Family ==
He was married to Françoise Buisett (also a Huguenot) in Soho in 1737. They were parents to six children.

== Artistic recognition ==
Gosset was portrayed by Thomas Gainsborough, probably due to their business connection.

=== Gallery ===
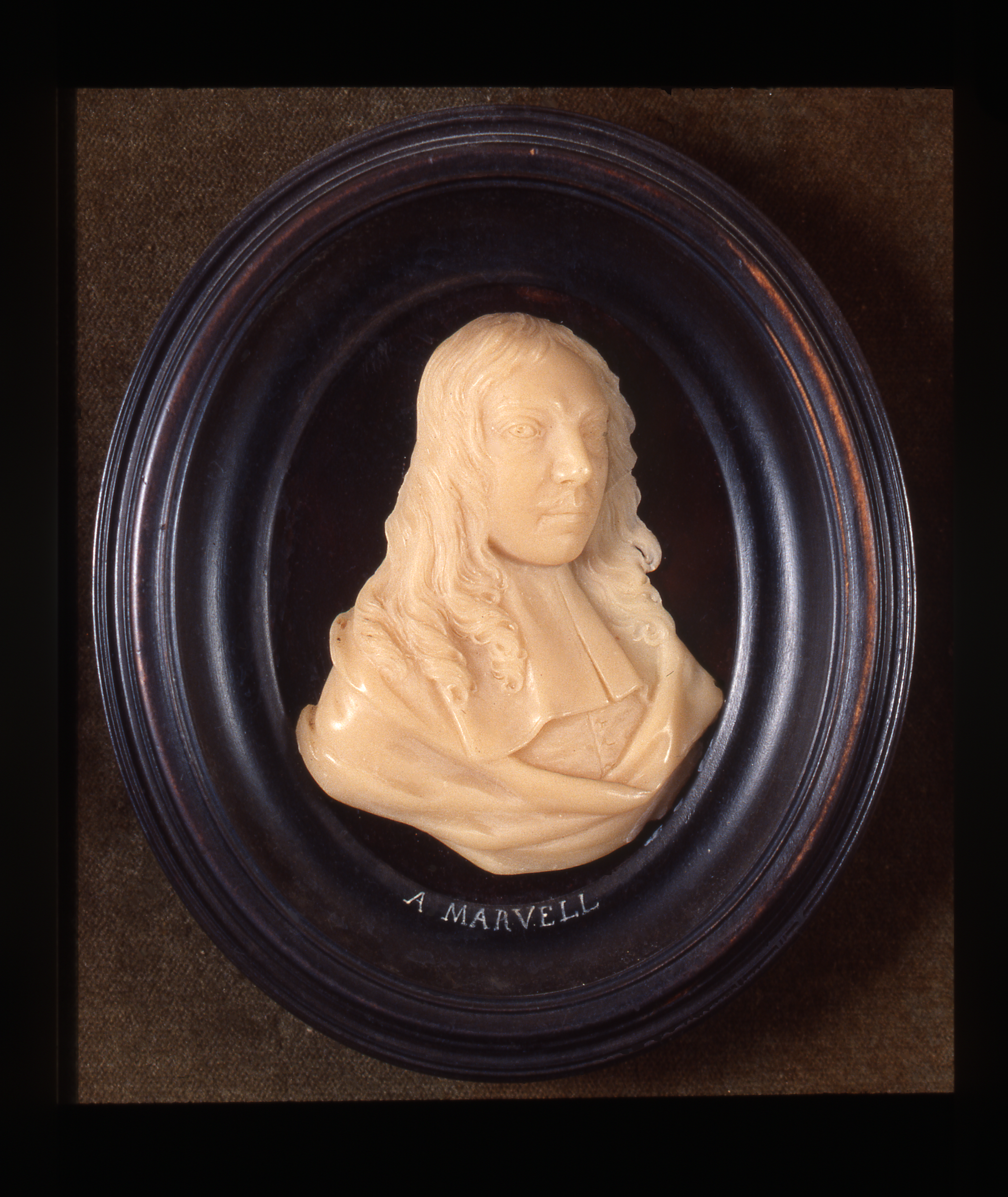
Andrew Marvell

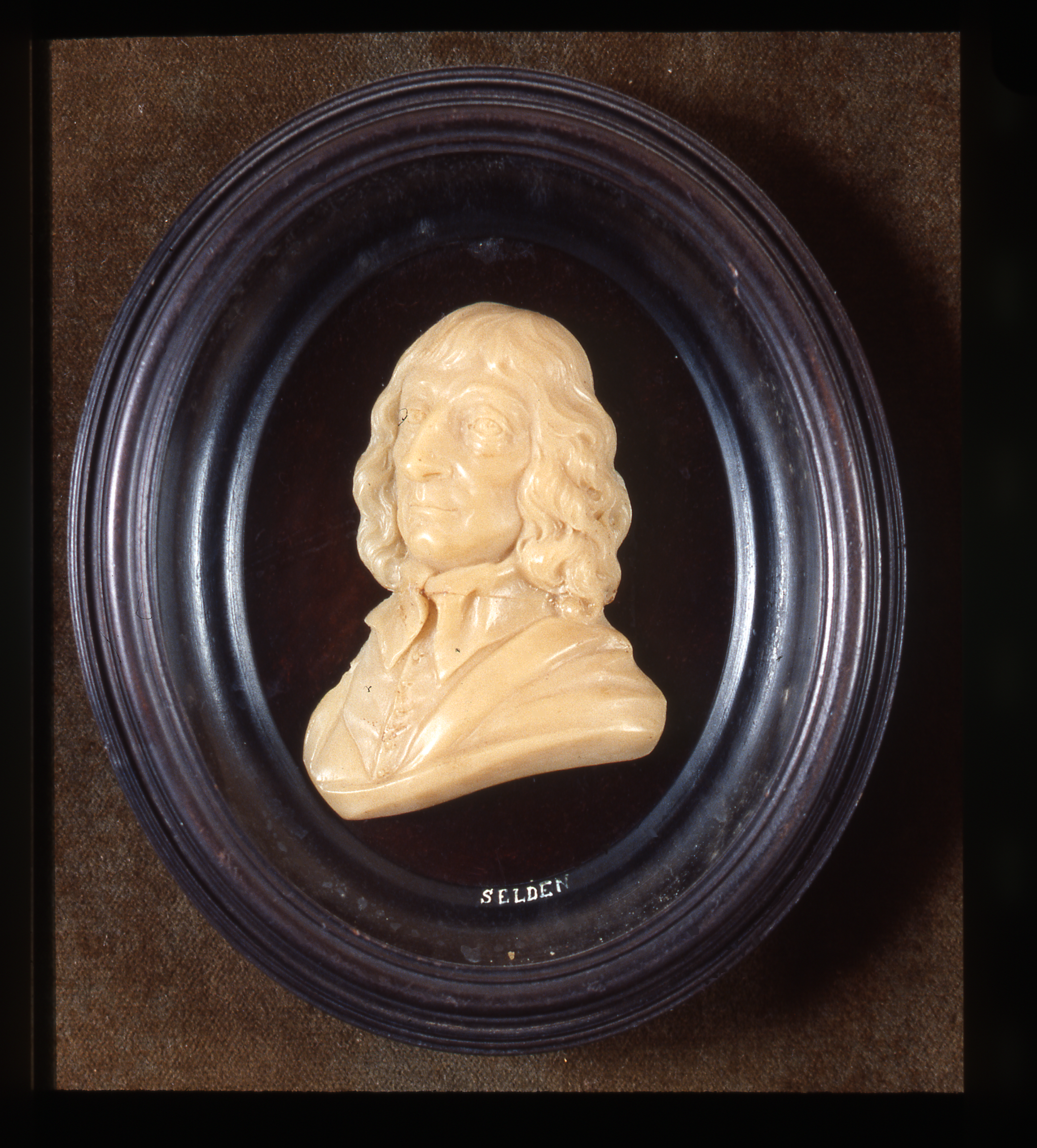
John Selden

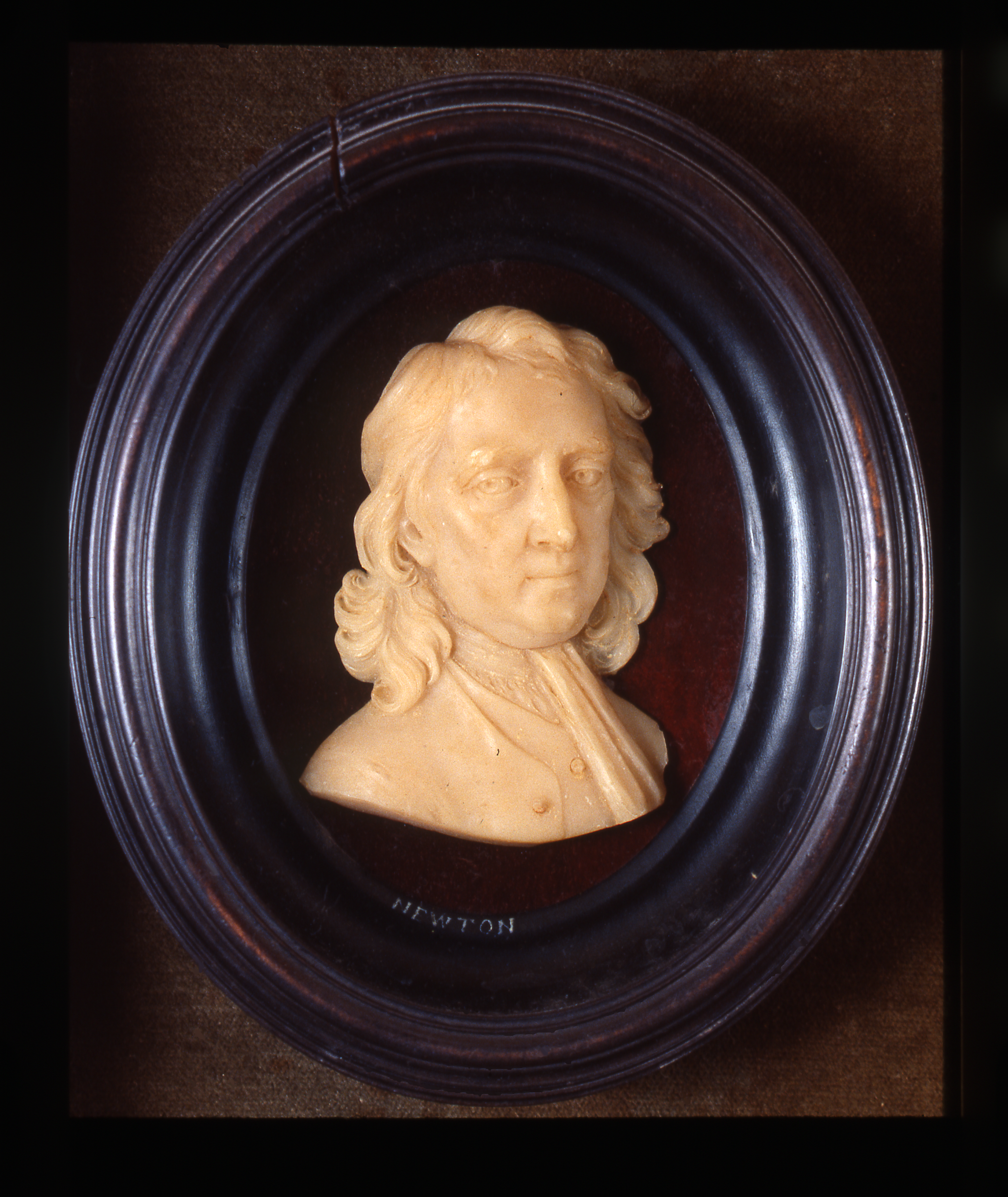
Isaac Newton

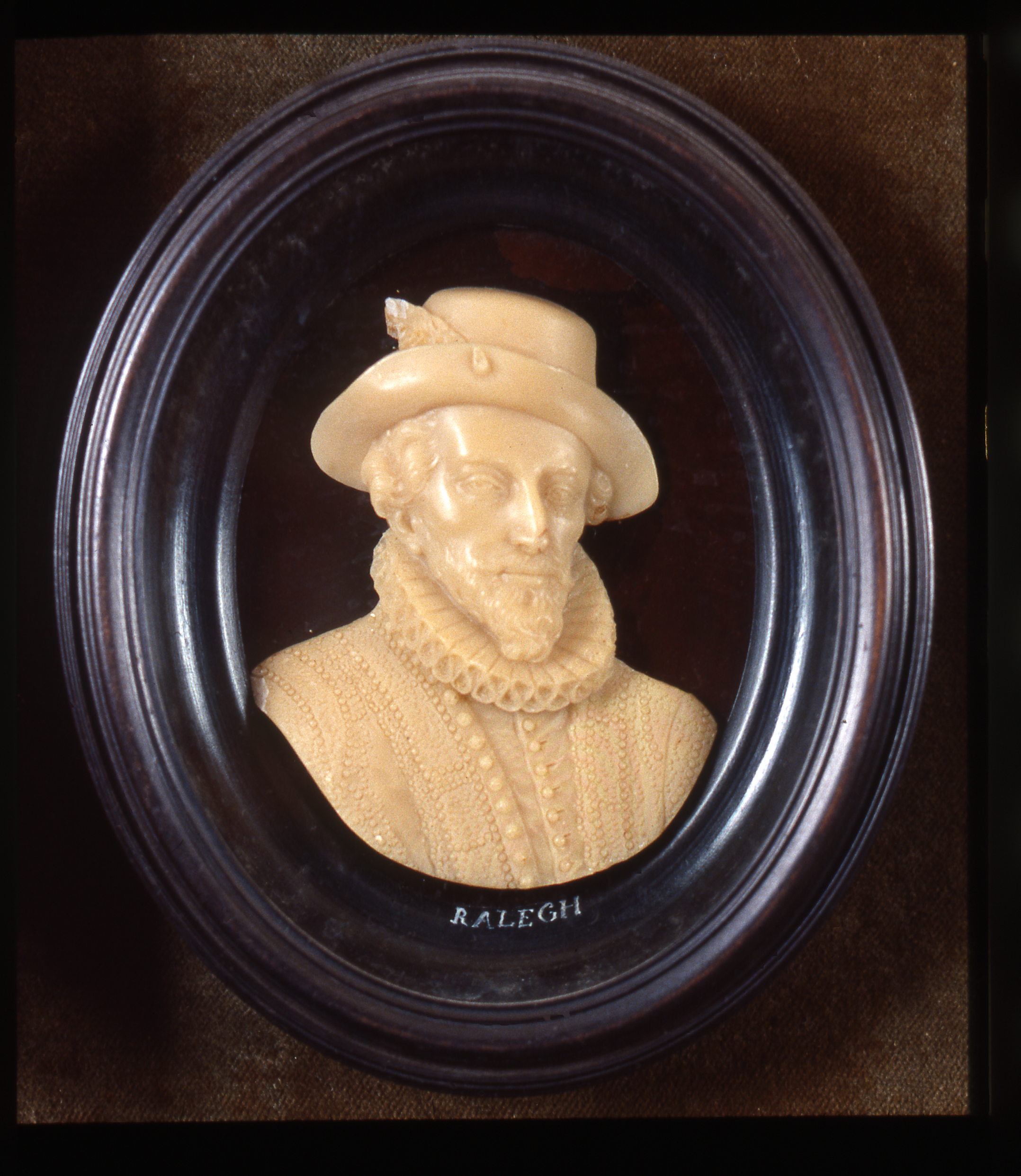
Sir Walter Raleigh

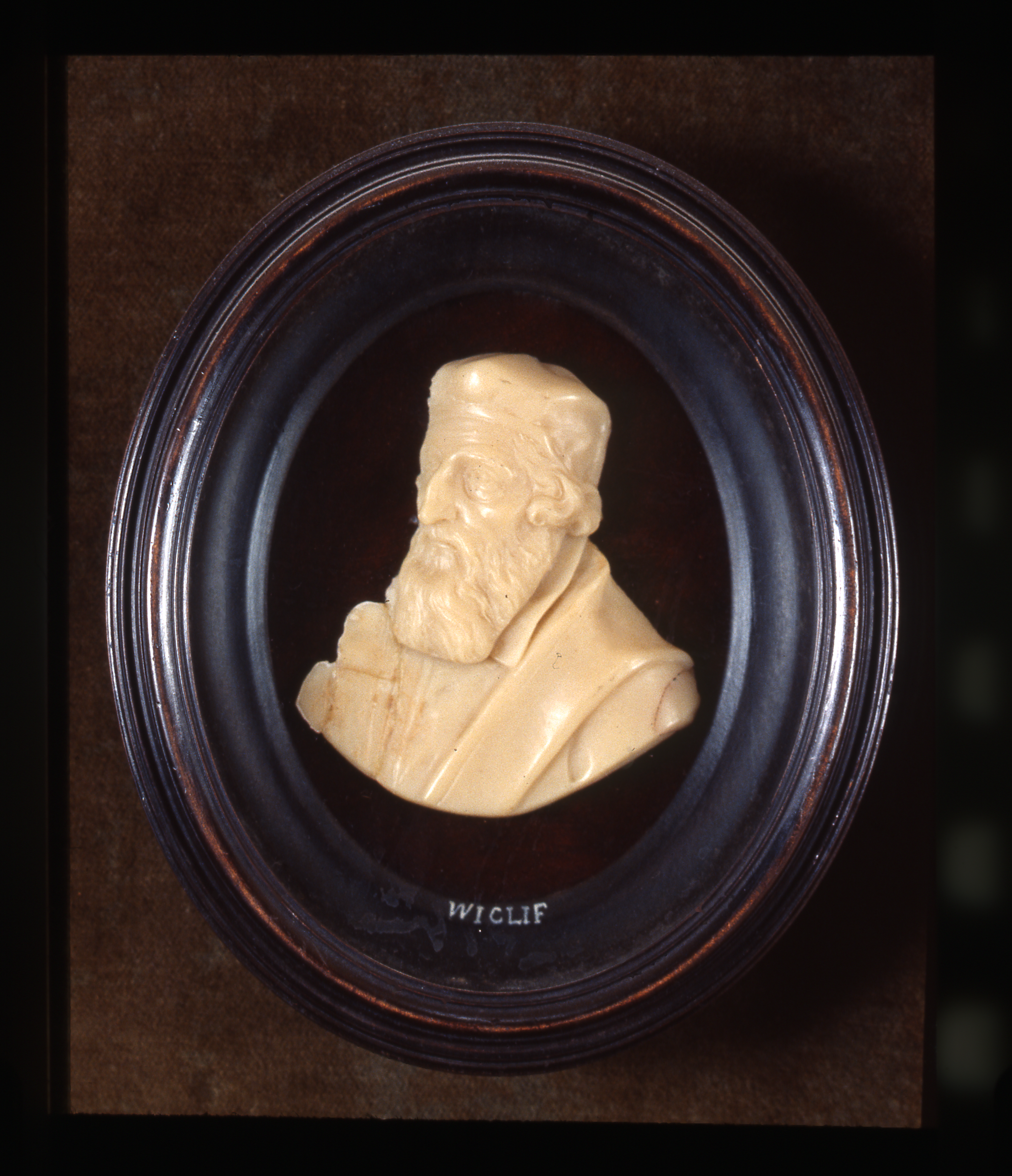
John Wycliffe

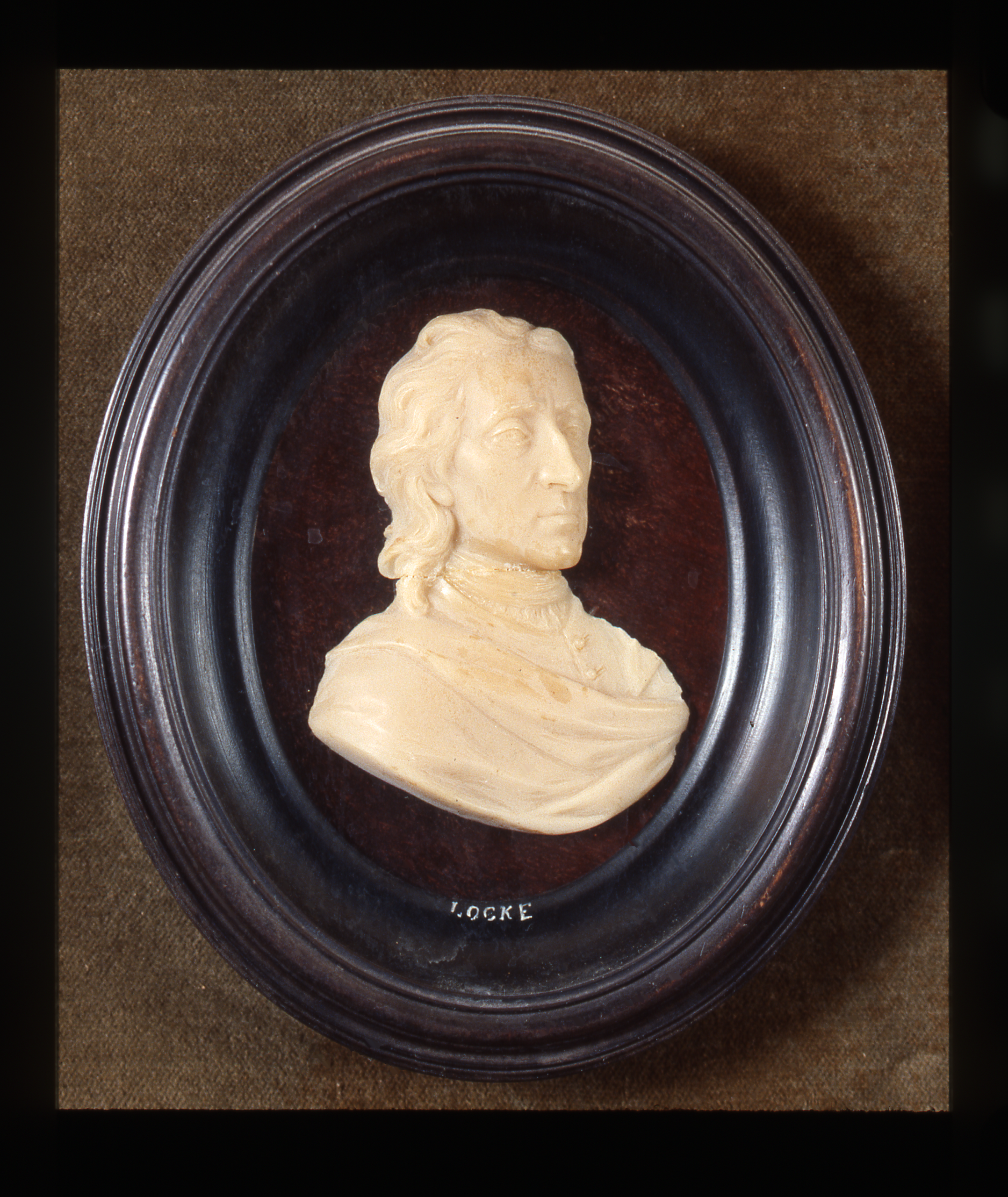
John Locke

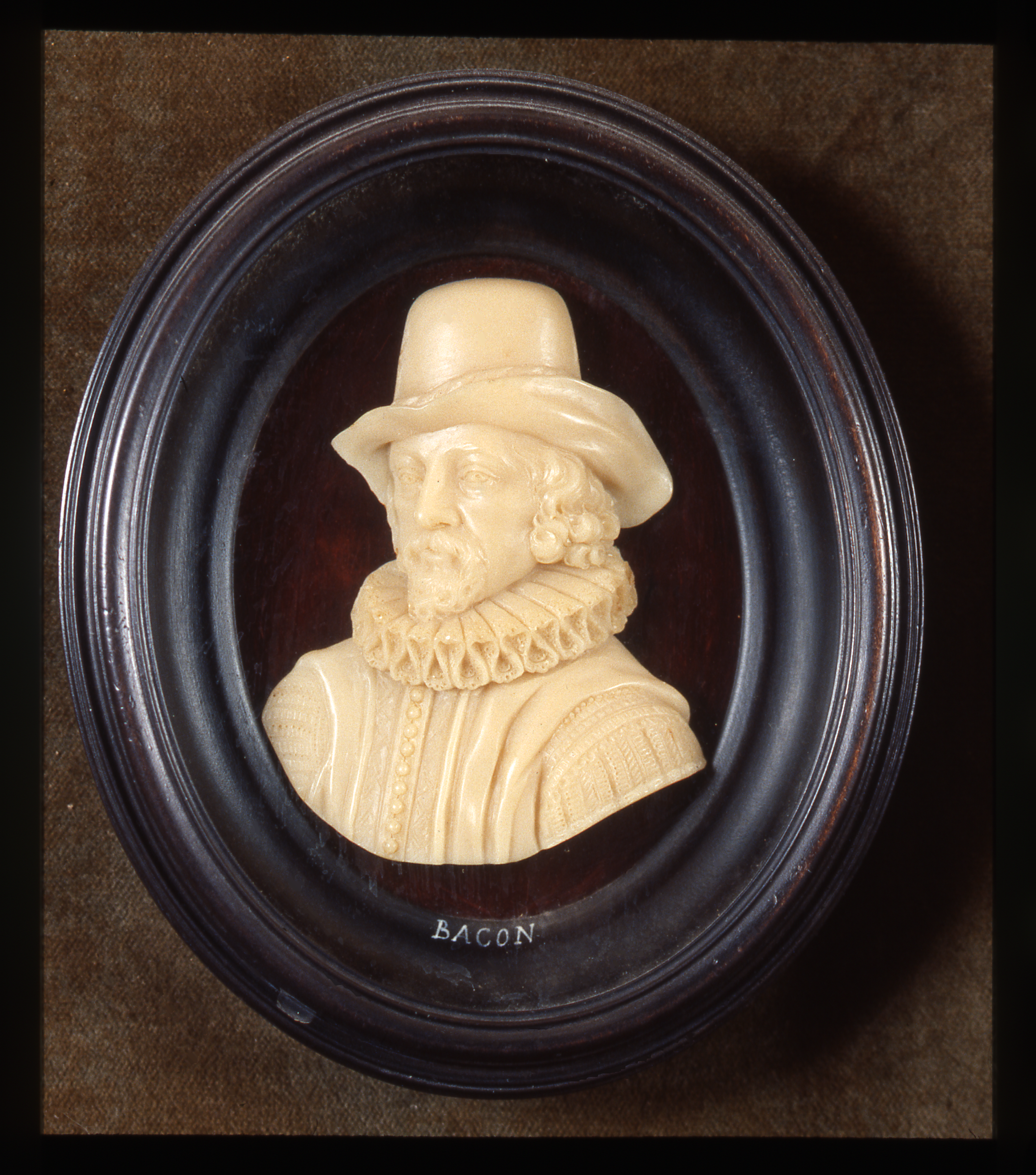
Francis Bacon

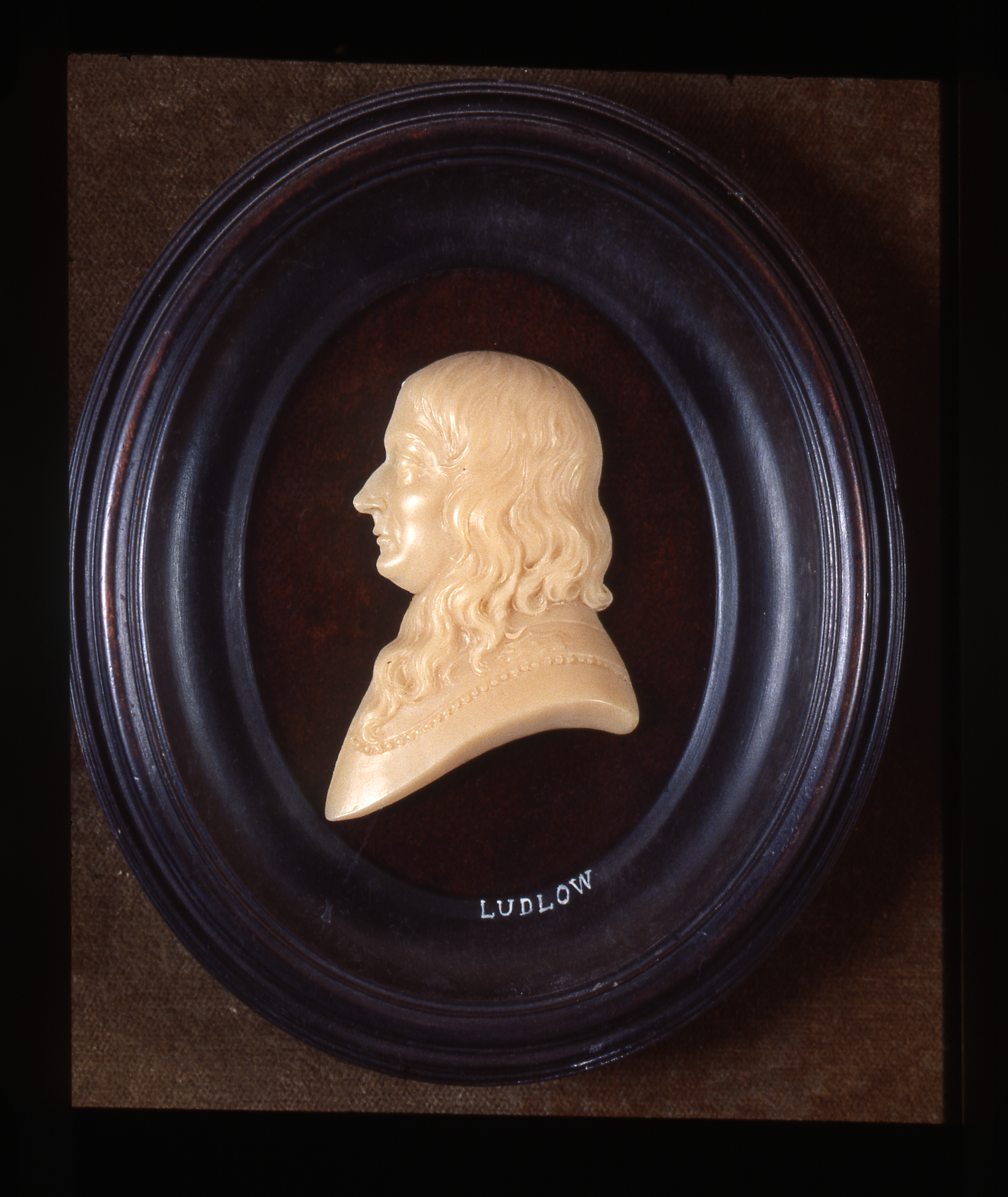
Edmund Ludlow

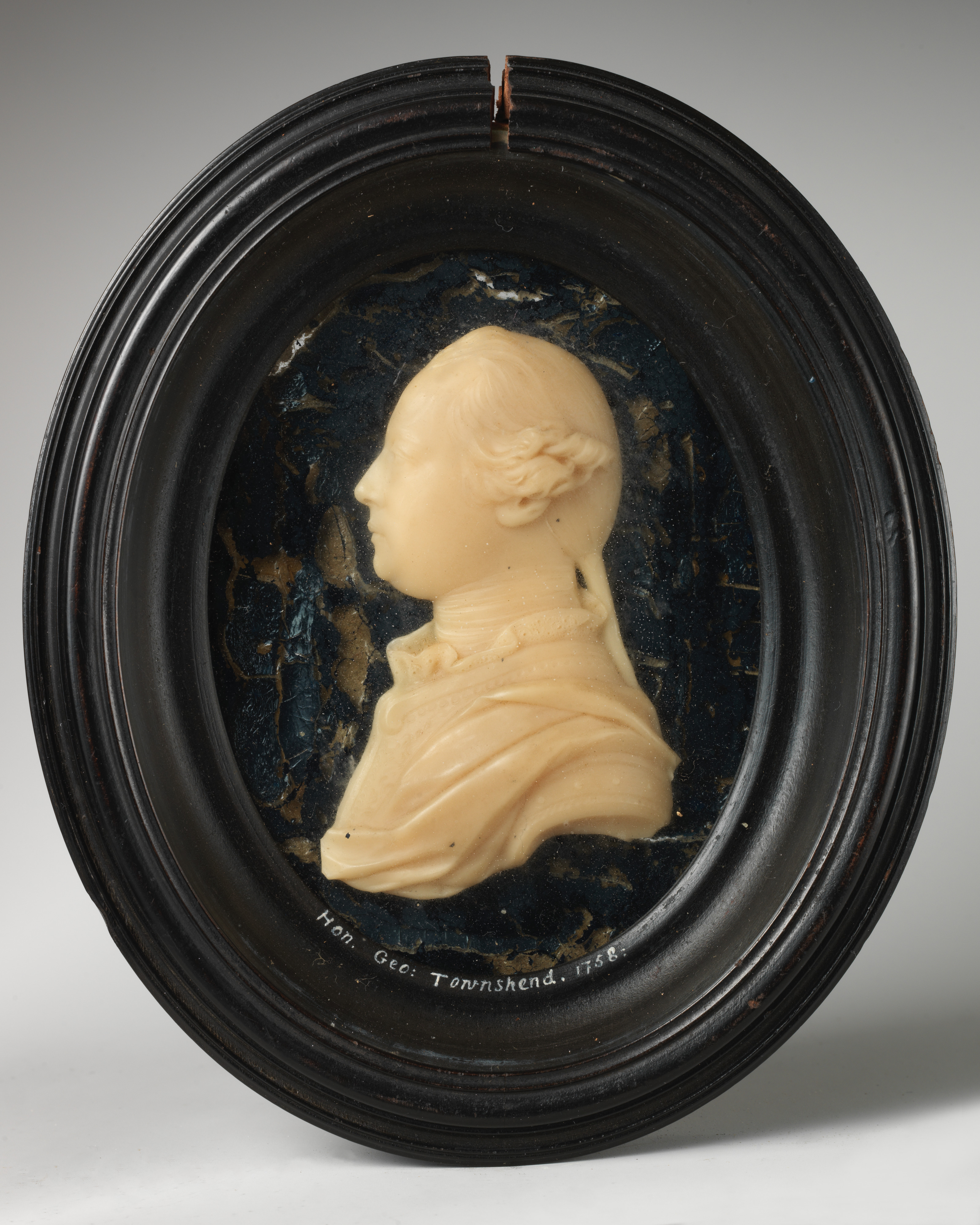
George Townshend, 1st Marquess Townshend
