= Honywood =

Honywood is an English-language surname. This list provides links to biographies of people who share this surname.

Notable people with the surname include:

== Military officers ==
- Sir Philip Honywood (c. 1677 – 1752), British Army officer
- Philip Honywood (British Army officer, died 1785) (c. 1710 − 1785) British Army officer and Member of Parliament

== Parliamentarians ==
- Christopher Honywood (died 1599), Member of Parliament of England for Hythe constituency
- Filmer Honywood (c. 1745 − 2 June 1809), MP for Canterbury
- John Honywood (MP for Hythe), in 1504 and 1510, Member of Parliament of England
- Sir John Honywood, 4th Baronet, MP for Canterbury, Honiton and Steyning
- John Lamotte Honywood (1647–1694), MP for Essex
- Robert Honywood (New Romney MP) (1601–1686), MP for New Romney
- Robert Honywood (Essex MP) (died 1735), MP for Essex
- Thomas Honywood (Hythe MP) (died 1580), Member of Parliament of England for Hythe
- Sir Thomas Honywood (Essex MP) MP (1586–1666), of Marks Hall in Essex
- Sir William Honywood, 2nd Baronet (c.1654 – 1748), MP for Canterbury
- William Honywood (died 1818) (c.1759 – 1818), MP for Kent
- William Philip Honywood (1790–1831), MP for Kent

== Others ==
- Mary Honywood (1527–1620), British heiress and supporter of persecuted Protestants; matriarch who lived to see over 360 of her descendants
- Michael Honywood (1597–1681), Dean of Lincoln and grandson of Mary Honywood
- Robert Honywood (cricketer) (1825–1870), of Marks Hall in Essex, son of William Philip Honywood, cricketer
- Captain Thomas Honywood (1819−1888), English archaeologist and photographer

== See also ==
- Honeywood
- Honywood baronets
- Honywood Community Science School, named after the Honywood family of Marks Hall
- Filmer baronets
- Henry Honywood Dombrain (1818–1905), British botanist, mycologist and cleric
