= William Honywood =

William Honywood may refer to:

- Sir William Honywood, 2nd Baronet (c.1654–1748), MP for Canterbury
- William Philip Honywood (1790–1831), MP for Kent
- William Honywood (died 1818) (c.1759–1818), MP for Kent
- Sir William Wynne Honywood, 10th Baronet, of the Honywood baronets

== See also ==
- Honywood
