= West Peckham Preceptory =

Monastery in Kent, England

- Location within Kent
- Interactive map of West Peckham Preceptory

Monastery information
- Order: Knights Hospitallers
- Established: c.1408
- Disestablished: c.1523

People
- Founder: John Culpeper

Site
- Coordinates: 51°15′0.34″N 0°21′38.57″E
- Grid reference: TQ 648 527
- Visible remains: None

West Peckham Preceptory was a preceptory in West Peckham, Kent, England.

== History ==
West Peckham Preceptory was founded circa 1408 by Sir John Culpeper of Oxon Hoath, West Peckham. It was held by the Knights Hospitallers, and used by them as an administrative centre. The preceptory remained in the possession of the Knights Hospitallers until it was dissolved by King Henry VIII circa 1523. At the time of the dissolution, it was valued at £63 6s 8d and had an income of £60 per annum.

== Sources ==
- Dumbreck, William Vincent (1983). A short history of St. Mary's, Hadlow. Hadlow: St Mary's Church.
- Hasted, Edward (1798). The History and Topographical Survey of the County of Kent. Vol. V. Canterbury: W Bristow. p59
