= John Honywood =

John Honywood may refer to:

- John Honywood (MP for Hythe), in 1504 and 1510, MP for Hythe
- John Lamotte Honywood (1647–1694), MP for Essex
- Sir John Honywood, 4th Baronet, MP for Canterbury, Honiton and Steyning
- The 3rd, 4th, 5th, 6th and 8th Honywood Baronets

== See also ==
- Honywood (surname)
