= Honeywood =

Honeywood is a surname. Notable people with the surname include:

- Brian Honeywood (born 1949), English footballer
- Phil Honeywood (born 1960), Australian politician
- Richard Honeywood, Australian video game localization director and translator
- Varnette Honeywood (1950–2010), American painter and writer

== See also ==
- Honeywood, Tasmania, Australia
- Honeywood Dam, United States
- Honeywood Museum, England
- Honeywood Winery, United States
- Honywood
