= Sir William Geary, 2nd Baronet =

British politician

Sir William Geary, 2nd Baronet (23 September 1756 – 6 August 1825) was an English Tory politician from West Peckham in Kent. He sat in the House of Commons from 1796 to 1806 and from 1812 to 1818.

He was the eldest surviving son of Admiral Sir Francis Geary, 1st Baronet of Polesden, Surrey and was educated at Cheam School and Magdalen College, Oxford (1773-6). He succeeded his father in 1796 after his elder brother Francis had been killed in the American War of Independence. He lived at Oxon Hoath in West Peckham.

Geary was elected at the 1796 general election as one of the two Members of Parliament (MPs) for Kent. He was re-elected in 1802, but was defeated at the 1806 general election. He did no contest the seat in 1807, but was re-elected at the 1812 general election. He held the seat until 1818, when he was defeated at the general election.

He was a Director of Greenwich Hospital, London from 1801 until his death in 1825.

He had married Henrietta, the daughter and coheiress of Richard Nevill, MP of Furnace, co. Kildare and the widow of Edward Dering, with whom he had 3 sons, each born at Oxon Hoath, West Peckham:

- Sir William Richard Powlett Geary, 3rd Baronet (1810–1877)
- Francis Geary, 4th Baronet (1812–1895)
- Richard Nevill John Geary (1816–1824)

He was succeeded by his eldest son.

Parliament of Great Britain
| Preceded by Filmer Honywood; Sir Edward Knatchbull, 8th Bt | Member of Parliament for Kent; 1796 – 1800; With: Sir Edward Knatchbull, 8th Bt | Succeeded by Parliament of the United Kingdom |
Parliament of the United Kingdom
| Preceded by Parliament of Great Britain | Member of Parliament for Kent; 1801 – 1806; With: Sir Edward Knatchbull, 8th Bt to 1802; Filmer Honywood from 1802 | Succeeded by William Honywood; Sir Edward Knatchbull, 8th Bt |
| Preceded by William Honywood; Sir Edward Knatchbull, 8th Bt | Member of Parliament for Kent; 1812 – 1818; With: Sir Edward Knatchbull, 8th Bt | Succeeded by William Philip Honywood; Sir Edward Knatchbull, 8th Bt |
Baronetage of Great Britain
| Preceded by Francis Geary | Baronet (of Oxenheath); 1796–1825 | Succeeded by William Richard Powlett Geary |
