= John Knatchbull =

John Knatchbull is the name of:

- Sir John Knatchbull, 2nd Baronet (c. 1630–1696), English MP for Kent and New Romney
- John Knatchbull (Royal Navy captain) (died 1844), British naval captain and convict found guilty of murder
- John Knatchbull, 7th Baron Brabourne (1924–2005), British peer, television producer and Academy Award nominated film producer
