= Sir Edward Knatchbull, 8th Baronet =

British politician and baronet

Sir Edward Knatchbull, Bt
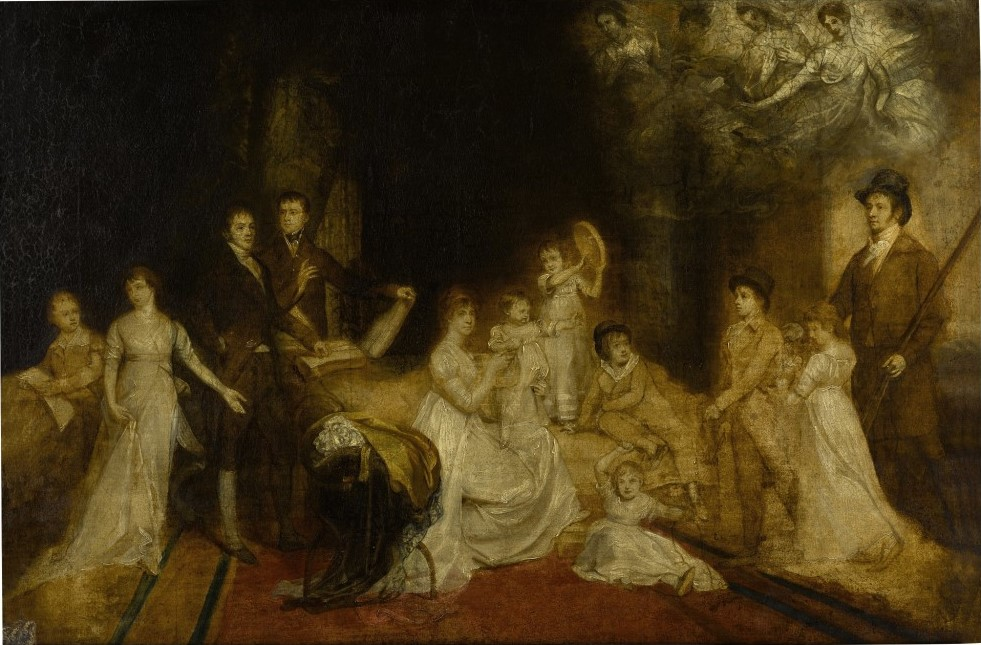
- Knatchbull with his children

Member of Parliament for Kent
- In office 1790–1802
- In office 1806–1819

Personal details
- Born: 22 May 1758
- Died: 1 September 1819 (aged 61)
- Spouse(s): Mary Hugessen; Frances Graham; Mary Hawkins
- Children: 19

Sir Edward Knatchbull, 8th Baronet (22 May 1758 – 1 September 1819) was a British landowner, baronet and politician. A member of the Knatchbull family of Mersham Hatch in Kent, he served as High Sheriff of Kent in 1785 and sat as Member of Parliament for Kent from 1790 to 1802 and again from 1806 until his death. In the House of Commons debate on abolition of the slave trade in 1792, although listed among MPs favourable to abolition, he successfully moved that abolition should be deferred until 1796.

== Background and education ==
Knatchbull was the only surviving son of Sir Edward Knatchbull, 7th Baronet and his wife Grace Legge, second daughter of William Legge. The Knatchbull baronets were seated at Mersham Hatch in Kent. In 1789, he succeeded his father as baronet.

Knatchbull was educated at Tunbridge and Winchester School. He matriculated at Christ Church, Oxford on 25 January 1777, aged 17, and was created Doctor of Civil Law by the University of Oxford on 6 July 1810.

== Kent politics ==
Knatchbull was High Sheriff of Kent in 1785. He entered the House of Commons of Great Britain at the 1790 general election, sitting for Kent until 1802. He represented the constituency again in the House of Commons of the United Kingdom from 1806 until his death in 1819.

== Slave trade abolition debate ==
Knatchbull was listed as "friendly" to abolition of the slave trade, but favoured a delayed timetable. In the House of Commons debate of 27 April 1792 on William Wilberforce's motion, after Henry Dundas had proposed that abolition should take effect on 1 January 1800, Knatchbull moved an amendment substituting 1 January 1796. The amendment was carried by 151 votes to 132.

The amended measure passed the House of Commons and proceeded to the House of Lords, but did not become law; abolition of the British slave trade was not enacted until 1807. William Hague, in his biography of William Pitt the Younger, describes the failure to complete abolition at this stage as Pitt's greatest failure. Historians have differed over the extent to which the failure of the 1792 bill should be attributed to Dundas's gradual timetable; Stephen Mullen has argued that Dundas was crucial in delaying abolition in April 1792, while a modern argument advanced by the Henry Dundas Committee is that the alteration of Dundas's plan reduced the chance of winning support in the House of Lords.

In the renewed abolition debates of the later 1790s Knatchbull continued to be associated with abolition. A Kent county study records that in the 1806 parliamentary election he recalled his 1792 motion for the discontinuance of the trade.

== Copley family portrait ==
Knatchbull commissioned John Singleton Copley to paint him with his children in a large family group portrait. The commission followed the death of his second wife, Frances Graham, in 1799, and showed Knatchbull as a widower with his children. Sotheby's describes the work, painted in 1800–03, as one of Copley's most ambitious and controversial late projects.

The preliminary oil sketch for the family group survives and is used as the image for this article. A related study of Knatchbull alone is held by the Metropolitan Museum of Art.

== Family and death ==
In July 1780, Knatchbull married firstly Mary Hugessen, daughter of William Western Hugessen. They had one son and two daughters. She died in 1784, and on 2 June 1785 he married secondly Frances Graham, daughter of John Graham. They had five sons and four daughters.

After Frances Graham's death in 1799, Knatchbull married thirdly Mary Hawkins, daughter of Thomas Hawkins, at St George's, Hanover Square on 13 April 1801. With his third wife he had seven children.

Knatchbull was a cousin of Catherine Knatchbull, who married Thomas Knight and was the adoptive mother of Edward Austen Knight, the brother of Jane Austen. In October 1820, after Knatchbull's death, his eldest son and successor married Austen's niece Fanny Knight.

Knatchbull died aged 61, after a short illness, at his son's house at Provender, Kent, and was buried in Mersham. He was succeeded in the baronetcy by his eldest son Edward. One of his younger sons was John Knatchbull, a Royal Navy officer and convict who was executed for murder in New South Wales in 1844 after unsuccessfully raising a plea of moral insanity.

== Sources ==
- Hague, William (2005). William Pitt the Younger. HarperPerennial. ISBN 978-0-00-714720-5.

Parliament of Great Britain
Preceded by Filmer Honywood; Charles Marsham	Member of Parliament for Kent; 1790 – 1801; With: Filmer Honywood 1790–1796; Sir William Geary, Bt 1796–1801	Succeeded by Parliament of the United Kingdom
Parliament of the United Kingdom
Preceded by Parliament of Great Britain	Member of Parliament for Kent; 1801 – 1802; With: Sir William Geary, Bt	Succeeded by Sir William Geary, Bt; Filmer Honywood
Preceded by Filmer Honywood; Sir William Geary, Bt	Member of Parliament for Kent; 1806 – 1819; With: William Honywood 1806–1812; Sir William Geary, Bt 1812–1818; William Philip Honywood 1818–1819	Succeeded by William Philip Honywood; Sir Edward Knatchbull, Bt
Baronetage of England
Preceded by Edward Knatchbull	Baronet (of Mersham Hatch); 1789–1819	Succeeded by Edward Knatchbull
