= Listed buildings in West Peckham =

Civil Parish in Kent, England

West Peckham is a village and civil parish in the Tonbridge and Malling district of Kent, England. It contains 20 listed buildings that are recorded in the National Heritage List for England. Of these two are grade I, one is grade II* and 27 are grade II.

This list is based on the information retrieved online from Historic England.

== Key ==
Grade	Criteria
I	Buildings that are of exceptional interest
II*	Particularly important buildings of more than special interest
II	Buildings that are of special interest

== Listing ==
Name	Grade	Location	Type	Completed (Note: The date given is the date used by Historic England as significant for the initial building or that of an important part in the structure's description.)	Date designated	Grid ref. (Note: The grid reference is based on the British national grid reference system, sometimes known as OSGB36, used by the Ordnance Survey.) Geo-coordinates	Notes	Entry number (Note: The "List Entry Number" is a unique number assigned to each listed building and scheduled monument by Historic England.)	Image	Wikidata
Church of St Dunstan	I	Church Road	church building		25 August 1959	TQ6442652574; 51°14′55″N 0°21′16″E		1070669	Church of St Dunstan More images	Q17530227
Hazel Hall	II	Church Road			1 August 1952	TQ6458652555; 51°14′54″N 0°21′25″E		1070668	Upload Photo	Q26324870
Post Office	II	Church Road			19 April 1985	TQ6445852549; 51°14′54″N 0°21′18″E		1115797	Upload Photo	Q26409486
Clements Cottage	II	Forge Lane			19 April 1985	TQ6435552745; 51°15′01″N 0°21′13″E		1363055	Upload Photo	Q26644905
The Forge House	II	Forge Lane			19 April 1985	TQ6447352770; 51°15′01″N 0°21′19″E		1115781	Upload Photo	Q26409471
Adams Well	II	Gover Hill			19 April 1985	TQ6369152701; 51°15′00″N 0°20′39″E		1115746	Upload Photo	Q26409440
Gover Cottage	II	Gover Hill			19 April 1985	TQ6331752922; 51°15′07″N 0°20′20″E		1070670	Upload Photo	Q26324873
Four Wents	II	Hamptons Road			19 April 1985	TQ6226951578; 51°14′25″N 0°19′24″E		1115761	Upload Photo	Q26409452
Vines Farm House	II	Matthews Lane			10 December 1974	TQ6395451781; 51°14′30″N 0°20′51″E		1320282	Upload Photo	Q26606298
Dukes Place	I	Mereworth Road, ME18 5JH			1 August 1952	TQ6483652687; 51°14′58″N 0°21′38″E		1070672	Upload Photo	Q17530234
Dukes Place Cottage	II	Mereworth Road			19 April 1985	TQ6480252665; 51°14′58″N 0°21′36″E		1115648	Upload Photo	Q26409347
The Old Vicarage	II	Mereworth Road			19 April 1985	TQ6469952574; 51°14′55″N 0°21′31″E		1363023	Upload Photo	Q26644878
Oxen Hoath	II*	Oxenhoath Road, Hadlow, TN11 9SS	English country house		1 August 1952	TQ6304852140; 51°14′42″N 0°20′05″E		1363044	Oxen Hoath More images	Q15264906
Hamptons	II	Park Road			1 August 1952	TQ6213852229; 51°14′46″N 0°19′18″E		1115659	Upload Photo	Q26409358
Hamptons Farmhouse	II	Park Road			19 April 1985	TQ6237552271; 51°14′47″N 0°19′30″E		1325938	Upload Photo	Q26611456
Little Egypt	II	Park Road			19 April 1985	TQ6259152319; 51°14′49″N 0°19′41″E		1363043	Upload Photo	Q26644894
The Clock House	II	Park Road			1 August 1952	TQ6220352257; 51°14′47″N 0°19′21″E		1070673	Upload Photo	Q26324879
Entrance Wall and Gate to Kitchen Garden at Oxon Hoath	II	School Road			19 April 1985	TQ6281652101; 51°14′41″N 0°19′53″E		1070645	Upload Photo	Q26324803
Gate Piers to North of Oxon Hoath with Flanking Walls	II	School Road			19 April 1985	TQ6291852209; 51°14′45″N 0°19′58″E		1363045	Upload Photo	Q26644895
Gate Piers to the East of Oxon Hoath	II	School Road			19 April 1985	TQ6309052111; 51°14′41″N 0°20′07″E		1070642	Upload Photo	Q26324791
Gate Piers to the South of Oxon Hoath with Flanking Walls	II	School Road			19 April 1985	TQ6289752006; 51°14′38″N 0°19′57″E		1070643	Upload Photo	Q26324794
Gates and Gate Piers to the West of Oxon Hoath	II	School Road			19 April 1985	TQ6292252142; 51°14′43″N 0°19′58″E		1070644	Upload Photo	Q26324799
Lodge to the West of Oxon Hoath	II	School Road			19 April 1985	TQ6262952075; 51°14′41″N 0°19′43″E		1070646	Upload Photo	Q26324806
The Coffin House	II	School Road			19 April 1985	TQ6268852352; 51°14′50″N 0°19′47″E		1070641	Upload Photo	Q26324788
The Dower House	II	School Road			19 April 1985	TQ6294552106; 51°14′41″N 0°19′59″E		1070647	Upload Photo	Q26324809
Hurst Cottage	II	Stan Lane			19 April 1985	TQ6402953276; 51°15′18″N 0°20′57″E		1107177	Upload Photo	Q26400989
Hope House	II	Swanton Road			19 April 1985	TQ6424253592; 51°15′28″N 0°21′09″E		1325206	Upload Photo	Q26610783
Oak Cot	II	Swanton Road			19 April 1985	TQ6417253537; 51°15′27″N 0°21′05″E		1070648	Upload Photo	Q26324812
Court Lodge	II	The Green			19 April 1985	TQ6441552431; 51°14′50″N 0°21′16″E		1363056	Upload Photo	Q26644906
Planned Farmyard at Court Lodge Farm Including Apple Store to South with Subsidiary Buildings and Barn with Outbuildings and Two Oasthouses to South	II	The Green			19 April 1985	TQ6438352458; 51°14′51″N 0°21′14″E		1070671	Upload Photo	Q26324876

== See also ==
- Grade I listed buildings in Kent
- Grade II* listed buildings in Kent

== Sources ==
- Newman, John (2012) [1969], Kent: West and the Weald, The Buildings of England, New Haven and London: Yale University Press, ISBN 978-0-300-18509-6
