= Sir Francis Geary, 1st Baronet =

Welsh Royal Navy Admiral (1709–1796)

Admiral Sir Francis Geary Bt
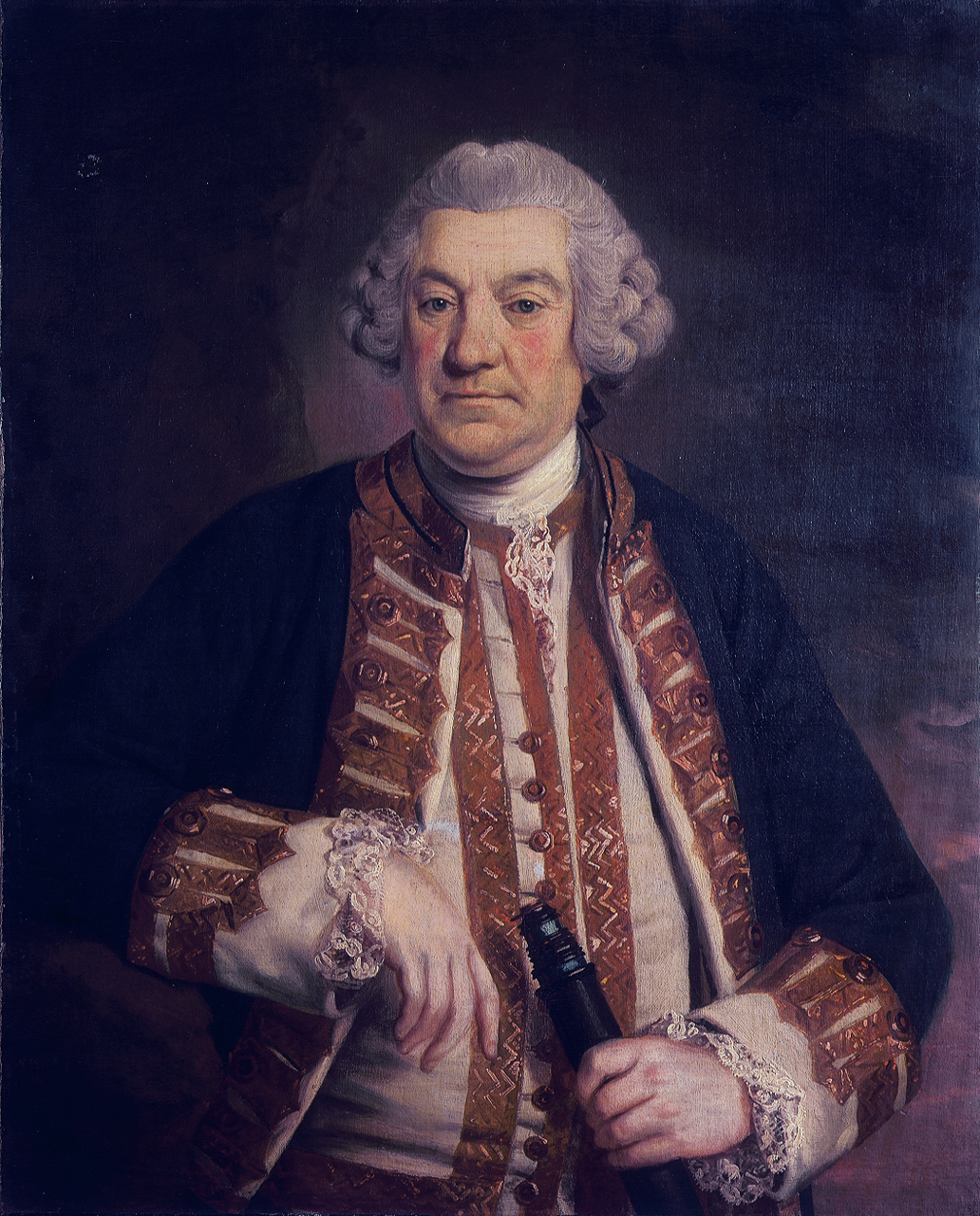
- Born: 1709; Ceredigion
- Died: 7 February 1796 (aged 86–87)
- Military career
- Allegiance: Great Britain
- Branch: Royal Navy
- Rank: Admiral
- Commands: HMS Squirrel; HMS Dolphin; HMS Chester; HMS Culloden; HMS Somerset; HMS Lenox; HMS Resolution; Nore Command; Portsmouth Command

Sir Francis Geary, 1st Baronet (1709 – 7 February 1796) was an officer of the Royal Navy. He served during the War of the Austrian Succession, the Seven Years' War, and the American War of Independence, eventually rising to the rank of Admiral.

== Family and early life ==
Geary was born in 1709 to a family that resided at Aberystwyth in Ceredigion but that moved to England shortly after his birth. He spent his early years at Ercall Magna, near Wellington, Shropshire, and later at Cheddington, Buckinghamshire. Before joining the navy, he was a noted bellringer, a member of the Ancient Society of College Youths, he participated in several early, record-breaking peals at St Bride's Church, Fleet Street, London. He entered the navy in 1727, serving as a volunteer aboard HMS Revenge. He sailed with Revenge into the Baltic, as part of a squadron under Admiral Sir John Norris. On her return to Britain Revenge was reassigned to sail with a fleet under Sir Charles Wager that was despatched to relieve Gibraltar. Geary spent the next fifteen years with the navy gradually progressing to midshipman, and then lieutenant.

== First commands ==
Geary was promoted to command HMS Squirrel on 30 June 1742. He cruised off Madeira, capturing a Spanish privateer, and capturing and burning a Spanish armed ship. On 10 February 1743 he came across the Spanish chartered French merchant Pierre Joseph. The Pierre Joseph was carrying a valuable cargo of silver, cochineal, indigo, hides and other goods. Geary boarded the vessel and took her as a prize. Geary then moved to command HMS Dolphin in early 1744, but was assigned to command HMS Chester on 17 February. He quickly departed on a cruise in company with HMS Sunderland, and on 20 February the two ships came across the French frigate Elephant, capturing her after a short battle. Geary took part in the capture of eight French merchants later in 1744, and took part in a court-martial aboard HMS Lenox in February 1745. He was then assigned to go to Louisbourg and support Commodore Peter Warren's assault on the fortress. He briefly participated, but was ordered home with despatches and so did not receive a share of the rewards.

Geary had by now secured a powerful patron, John Russell, 4th Duke of Bedford, who was then the First Lord of the Admiralty, and through Russell's actions, Geary was appointed to command the 74-gun HMS Culloden. He was sent to reinforce Rear-Admiral Edward Hawke in the Bay of Biscay in 1747, and spent the rest of the war there, returning in 1748. He was then promoted to Commodore and appointed Commander-in-Chief of the squadron in the Medway, but relinquished the command in September that year. He married Mary Bartholomew that month and spent the peace in quiet retirement. He had purchased the estate of Polesden Lacey in 1747.

== Return to service ==
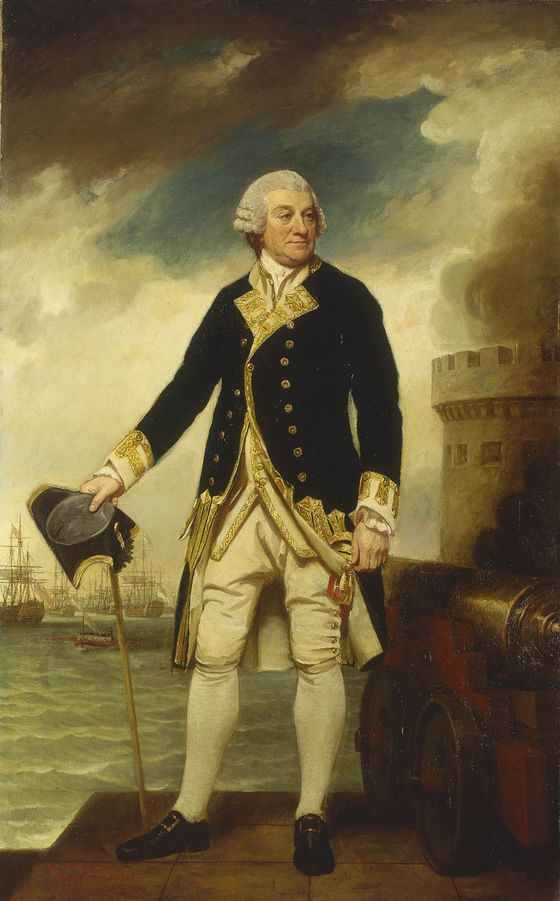
Admiral Sir Francis Geary, painted in 1782/3 by George Romney. He is depicted at his command at Portsmouth. Behind him are the ships of his fleet, including his flagship, HMS Victory.

The increase of tensions prior to the outbreak of the Seven Years' War led to Geary's return to service in 1755. He was assigned to the 70-gun HMS Somerset, and sailed to North America with Admiral Edward Boscawen's fleet, returning in November. At the end of 1755 Geary received orders to join the Channel Squadron under Sir Edward Hawke. During the winter of 1756 and into early 1757 Geary was part of the court-martial of Admiral John Byng. In April Geary aboard the Somerset, and in company with HMS Rochester, captured a number of privateers. In February 1758 Geary was given command of HMS Lenox, moving the following year to HMS Resolution. He sailed Resolution as part of the fleet under Hawke, quickly being assigned to command a squadron of ten ships of the line, two frigates and a fireship. He was promoted to Rear-Admiral of the Blue on either 19 May or 5 June, and on 7 July moved his flag to the 90-gun HMS Sandwich. He moved again on 29 August to HMS Royal George whilst the Sandwich underwent a refit, returning to Sandwich in late September.

Geary remained with Hawke, patrolling off the French coast, before returning with the fleet in November. The Sandwich had lost her main-mast in a storm, and was forced to remain in port as Hawke put to sea again. Geary was therefore unable to take part in Hawke's victory at Quiberon Bay on 20 November. Geary spent the rest of 1759 and some of 1760 patrolling off Ushant. After a stay in port, he put to sea again on 30 April to intercept a French squadron assembling at Rochefort for a voyage to the East Indies. He cruised off the port until it became clear the French had abandoned the expedition, on which he was ordered to rejoin Hawke. He returned to Britain in October and became Port Admiral at Spithead, flying his flag aboard HMS Royal Sovereign. He oversaw preparations for the expedition against Belle Île, and those for Sir George Pocock's expedition against Cuba.

== Further advances ==
Geary was promoted to Vice-Admiral of the Blue on 21 October 1762. He remained at Spithead, with a brief period as Commander-in-Chief, The Nore, until the peace in 1763 ended the war. He struck his flag and entered another period of retirement until November 1769, when he became Commander-in-Chief, Portsmouth. Increasing tensions with Spain led to his return to service and his promotion to Vice-Admiral of the Red on 17 October 1770. He retired again after the relieving of tensions led to a reduction in the navy. Though not on active service, he continued to rise through the ranks based on his seniority. He became Admiral of the Blue on 31 March 1775, and Admiral of the White on 29 January 1778. The death of Admiral Sir Charles Hardy in May 1780 led to Geary being recalled to service, despite being in poor health. He hoisted his flag aboard the 100-gun first rate HMS Victory, with Richard Kempenfelt as his flag captain and took command of the Channel Fleet. Geary put to sea, patrolling off Brest in the hope of preventing the joining of the French and Spanish fleets. Sails were sighted on 9 July, and Geary gave chase believing them to be one of the enemy fleets. It was found that they were instead an enemy merchant convoy. Geary engaged and captured twelve of the merchants, the rest escaping under cover of fog.

== Retirement and death ==
Geary returned to port in August, but was taken ill and returned to Polesden Lacey. Feeling himself unfit to retain command, he requested and received permission to resign. He was created a baronet on 17 August 1782, and died at the age of 86 on 7 February 1796.

== Family and personal life ==
Geary married Mary Bartholomew in 1747. The marriage produced two sons and three daughters. His eldest son, also named Francis, joined the army. He became a Cornet of the 16th The Queen's Lancers, but was killed in North America in an ambush in 1776. Mary died on 28 August 1778. Geary's second son, William, inherited the baronetcy on his death.

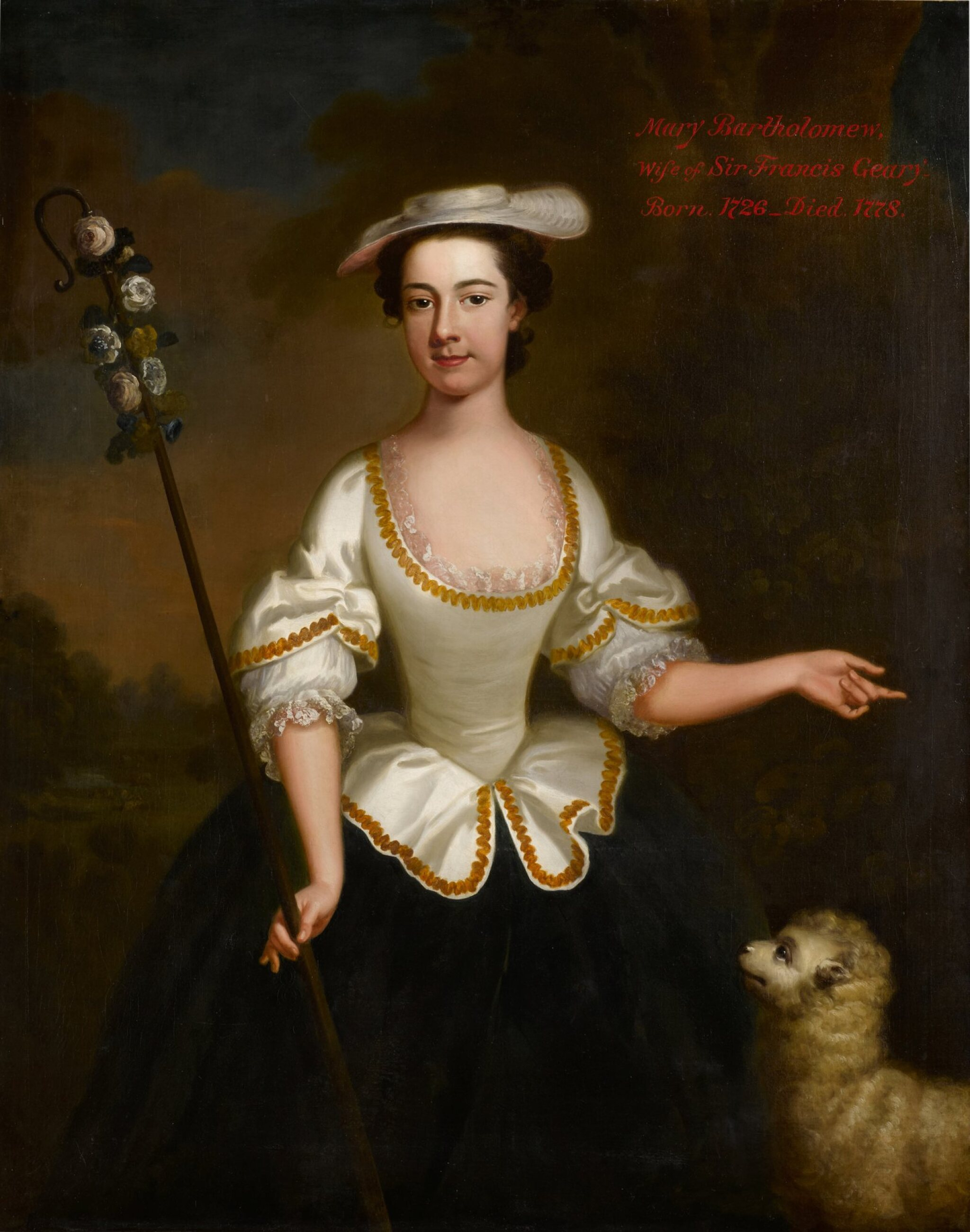
Mary Bartholomew,
portrait by Peter van Bleeck

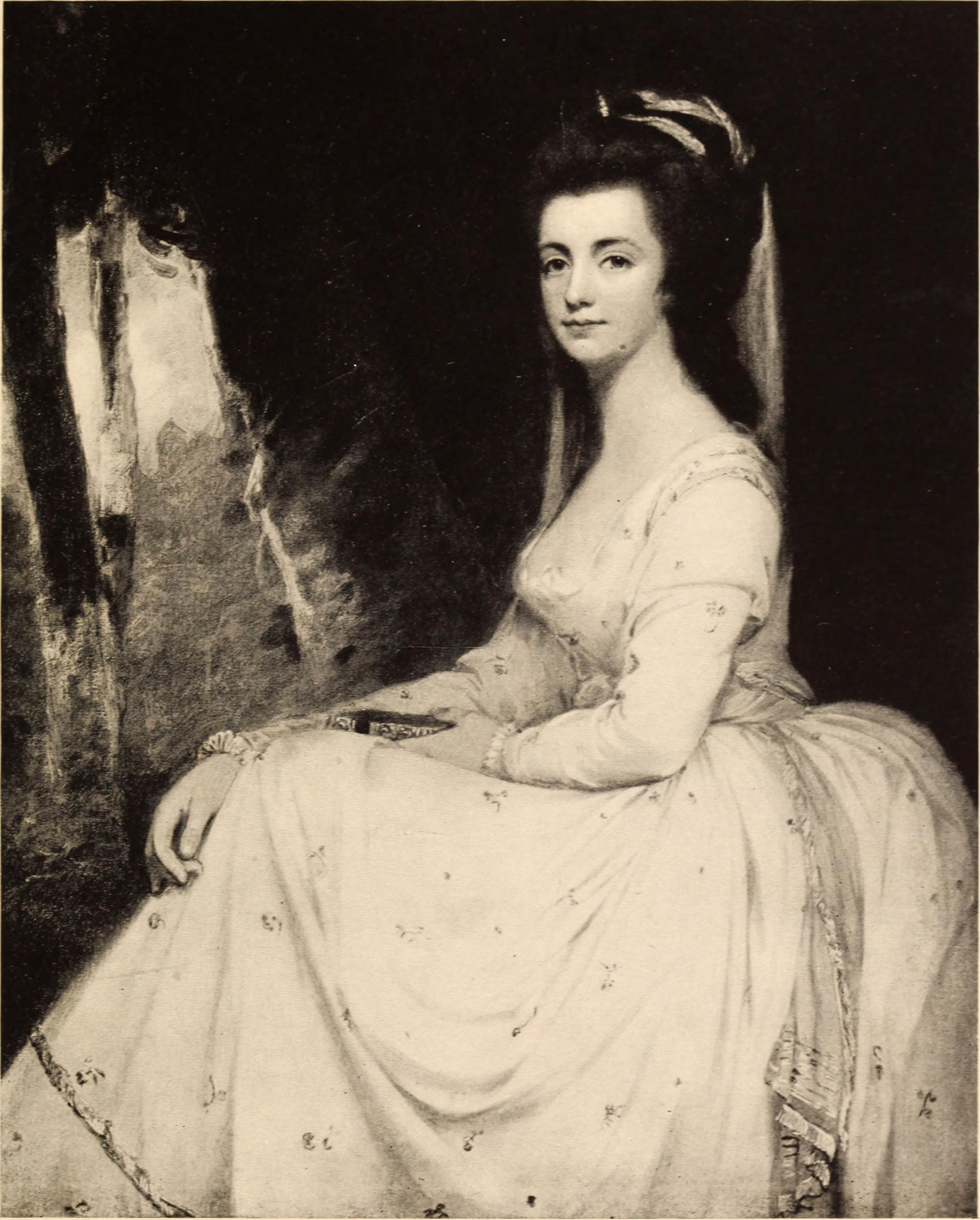
Elizabeth Geary, later Lady Twisden

== Notes ==
Military offices
Preceded by Sir John Moore	Commander-in-Chief, Portsmouth; 1769–1771	Succeeded by Thomas Pye
Baronetage of Great Britain
New creation	Baronet (of Oxenheath); 1782–1796	Succeeded by William Geary
