= Geary baronets =

- Escutcheon of the Geary baronets of Oxenheath
- Creation date: 1782
- Status: extinct
- Extinction date: 1944
- Seats: Oxon Hoath, Tunbridge
- Motto: Chase

The Geary Baronetcy, of Oxenheath in the County of Kent, was a title in the Baronetage of Great Britain. It was created on 17 August 1782 for Francis Geary, an admiral in the Royal Navy. His eldest son and heir, also called Francis Geary, fought in the American War of Independence and was killed in an ambush in 1776. The baronetcy therefore passed directly to Admiral Geary's second son, Sir William Geary, who served as Member of Parliament for Kent between 1796 and 1806, and again between 1812 and 1818. The third Baronet, Sir William Geary, served as MP for a successor constituency, West Kent, from 1835 until 1838. The baronetcy became extinct on the death of the fifth Baronet, Sir William Geary, in 1944.

== Geary baronets, of Oxenheath (1782) ==
- Sir Francis Geary, 1st Baronet (1709–1796)
- Sir William Geary, 2nd Baronet (1756–1825)
- Sir William Richard Powlett Geary, 3rd Baronet (1810–1877)
- Sir Francis Geary, 4th Baronet (1811–1895)
- Sir William Nevill Montgomerie Geary, 5th Baronet (1859–1944)
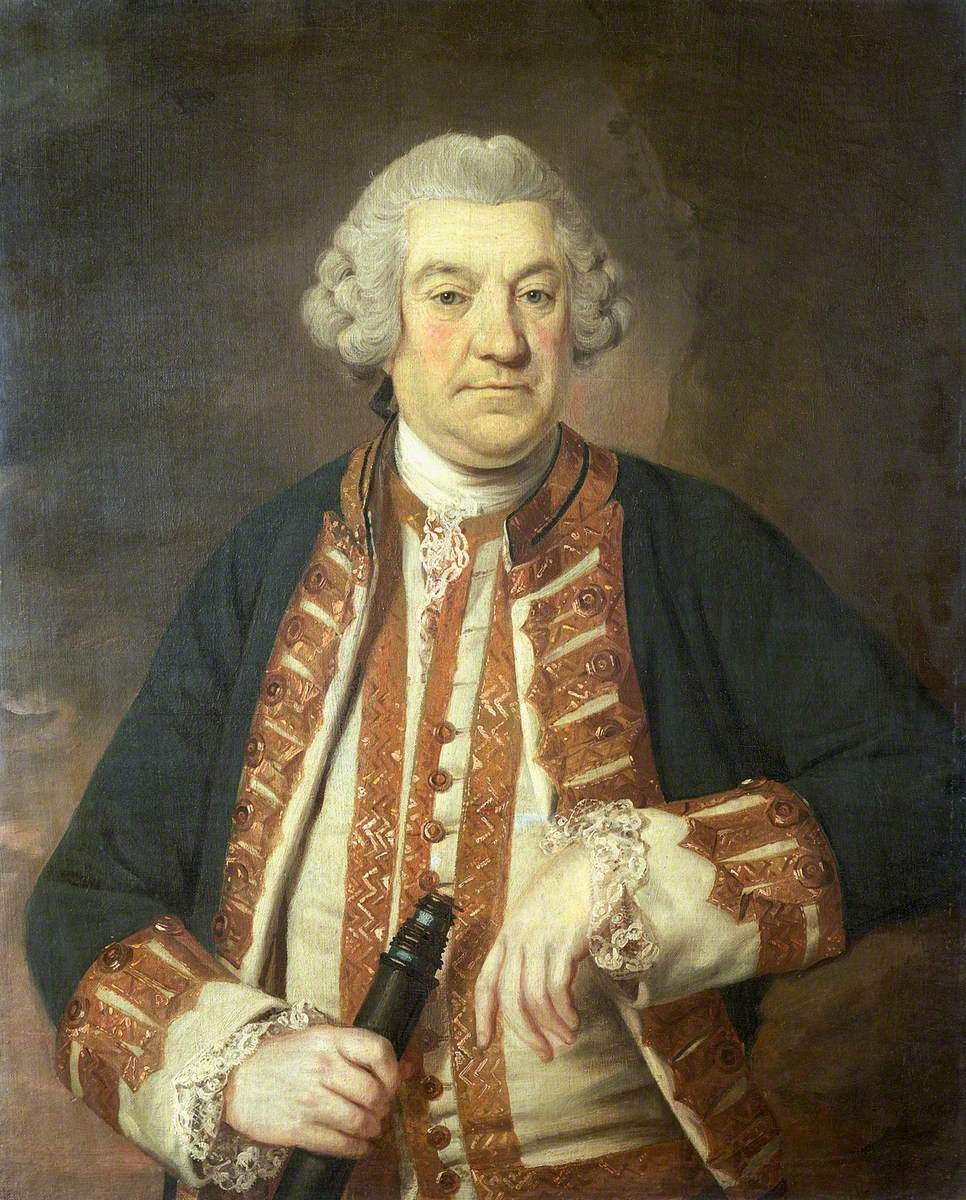
Admiral Sir Francis Geary, 1st Baronet

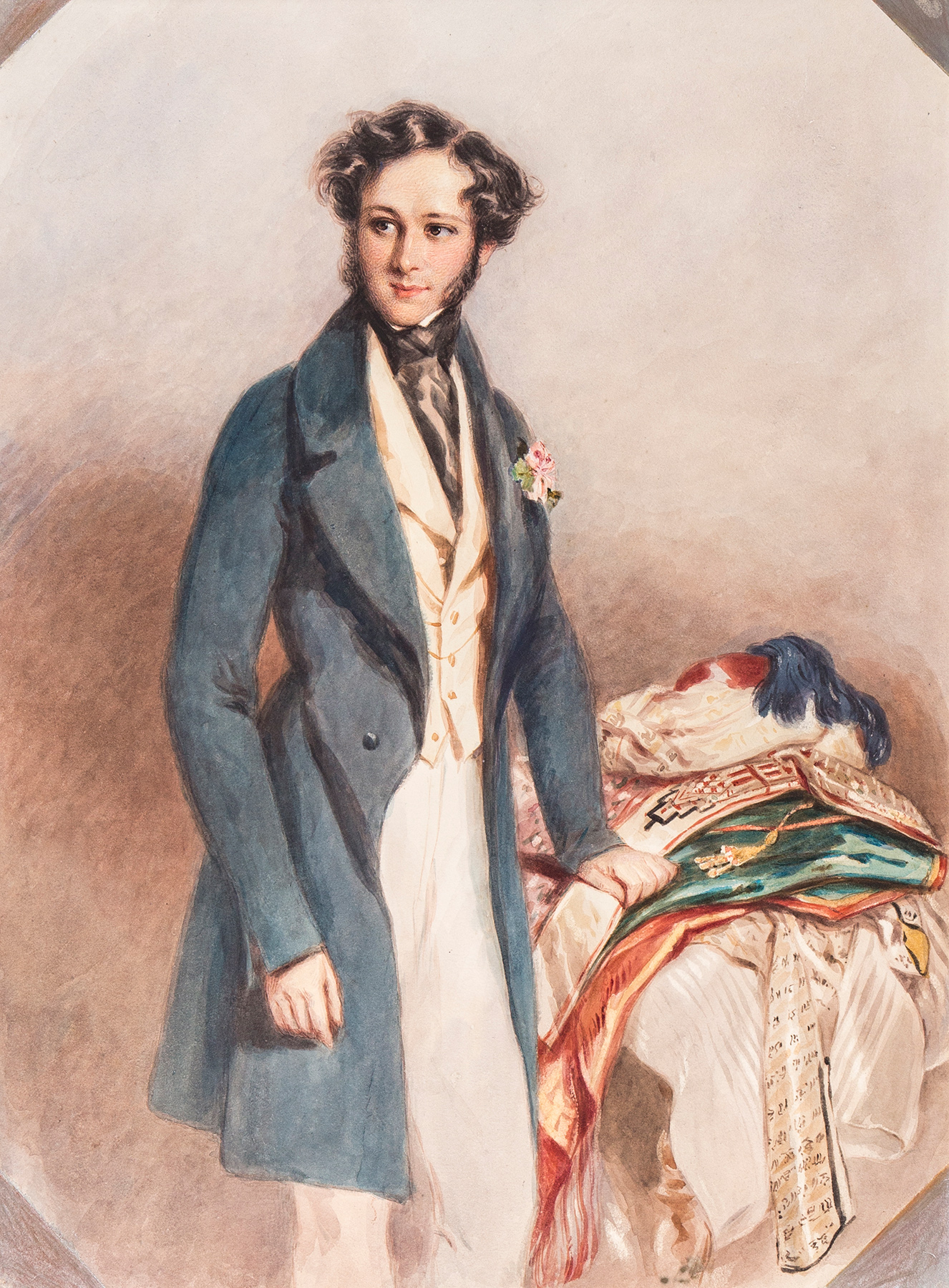
Sir William Geary, 3rd Baronet

Baronetage of Great Britain
Preceded by Kent baronets	Geary baronets of Oxenheath; 17 August 1782	Succeeded by Parker baronets
