= John Knatchbull (Royal Navy officer) =

Royal Navy officer

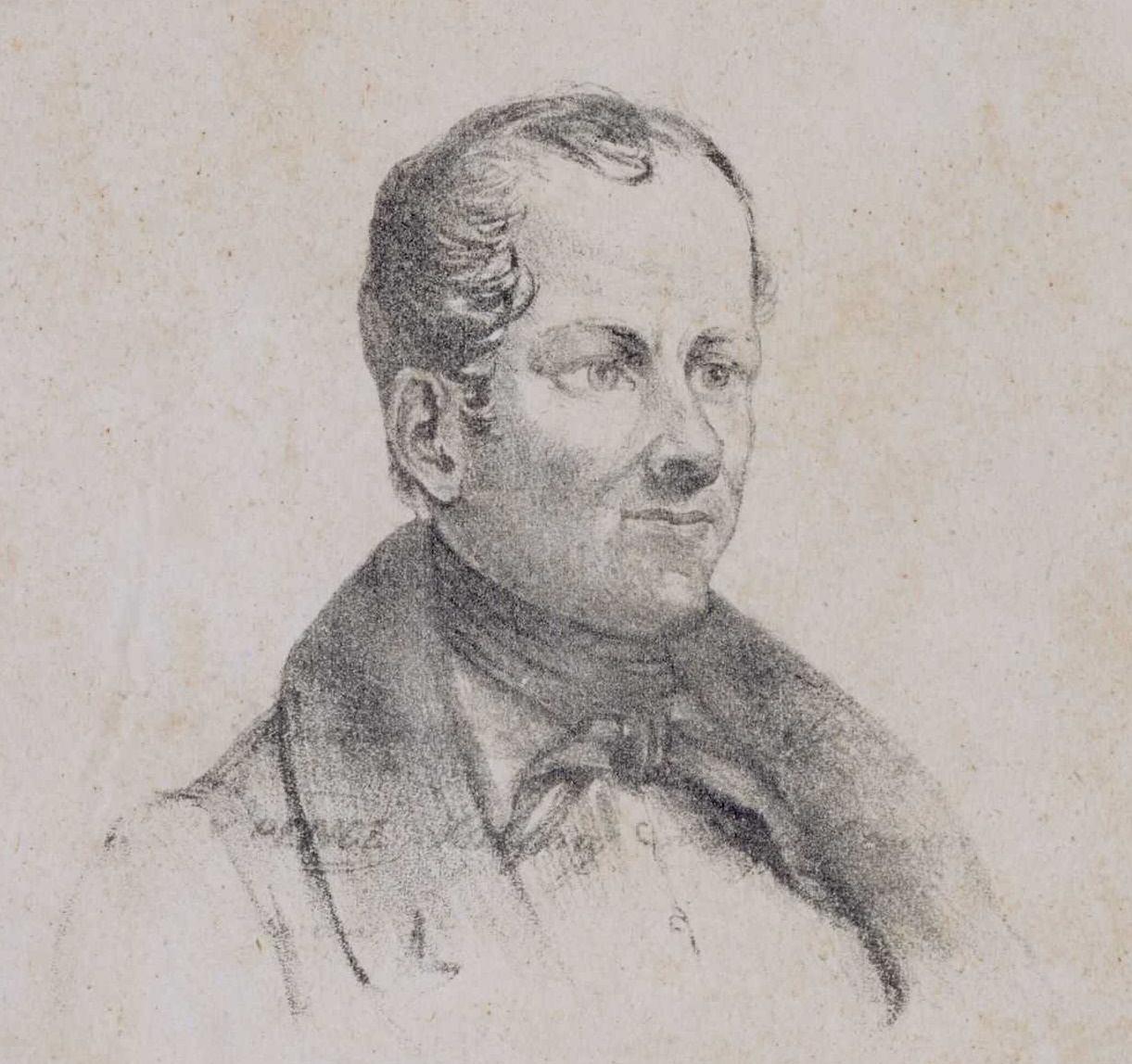
- Lithographic of Knatchbull prior to his execution in February 1844
- Born: John Knatchbull; 1789; Norton, Kent, England
- Died: 13 February 1844 (aged 54–55); Darlinghurst Gaol, New South Wales, Australia
- Other name: John Fitch
- Occupations: Naval captain; convict
- Criminal charges: Murder
- Criminal penalty: Execution

John Graham Knatchbull (1789 – 13 February 1844) was a Royal Navy officer who served in the French Revolutionary and Napoleonic Wars. He later became a convict who was transported to New South Wales in 1824, where Knatchbull was convicted of murder in January 1844 and executed in Sydney.

Knatchbull was born into the landed gentry. His father directed his education towards a career in the British navy, which he joined as a volunteer in 1804, aged fourteen, in the early period of the Napoleonic Wars. He was appointed a midshipman in 1806, rising to the rank of lieutenant in 1810. He briefly commanded the sloop HMS Doterel, sailing the vessel from the West Indies to England via the Azores in 1815. After the defeat of the French army at Waterloo in June 1815, Knatchbull was retired on half-pay. In 1818 he was removed from the Naval List in consequence of an unpaid debt he had incurred in April 1815 when his vessel had been stationed at the Azores.

In August 1824 Knatchbull was apprehended by the police and found in possession of a stolen sovereign and blank cheque. He was tried under the name of 'John Fitch' and sentenced to transportation for fourteen years in the colony of New South Wales. He was assigned to various employers in areas west of Sydney. In February 1832 he was convicted of forging a bank draft, for which he received an addition sentence of seven years on the Norfolk Island penal settlement. During the voyage to Norfolk Island and his time on the island Knatchbull was involved in two separate attempted mutinies, though his role in both was probably connected with his potential usefulness as a seaman and in both cases he was not identified or punished as a ringleader.

Knatchbull was returned to Sydney in May 1839 to serve out the remainder of his original sentence. He was sent from there to Port Macquarie. By 1843 he was employed on coasting vessels owned by Thomas Lewis, operating between Port Macquarie and Sydney. By the end of the year Lewis had become insolvent and Knatchbull was living in Sydney.

In January 1844 Knatchbull fatally wounded Ellen Jamieson with a tomahawk, in the process of robbing the small shop she operated from her residence in Sydney. He was apprehended at the scene by vigilant neighbours. Mrs. Jamieson, a widow with two small children, died from her wounds after eleven days and Knatchbull was charged with murder. He was tried on 24 January 1844. His defence counsel, Robert Lowe, attempted to prove that Knatchbull had committed the murder while in a state of "moral insanity" (at that stage a novel legal defence). The prisoner was found guilty and sentenced to death. Knatchbull was publicly hanged on 13 February 1844, on gallows erected outside the gaol on Darlinghurst Hill.

== Biography ==
=== Early years ===
John Knatchbull was born into a family of the landed gentry of county Kent in England. He was born in 1789 on the 'Provender' estate at Norton in Kent, the third son (and one of eight children) of Sir Edward Knatchbull and his second wife, Frances (née Graham). His father became the eighth in a line of baronets in 1789 and inherited the Knatchbull family estate at Mersham, south-east of Ashford, with a mansion house known as 'Mersham Hatch' or 'Mersham-le-Hatch' (completed in 1763).^{[A]}

John Knatchbull's mother died in November 1799. John and his siblings were then placed under the care of a governess, Miss Verney. He received his first formal education at Rev. Stoddart's Grammar School at nearby Ashford. Later, after his father had decided that John should be educated for the Royal Navy, he was sent to Rev. Dr. Charles Burney's school at Greenwich in south-east London, the master of which was described by Knatchbull as "a very hostile man, proud in the extreme, and very severe in his discipline".

=== Royal Navy ===
In August 1804, when he was aged fourteen, Knatchbull entered into service in the Royal Navy as a 'volunteer', a customary manner of naval enlistment for the younger sons of gentlemen. His first ship was HMS Ardent, commanded by Captain Winthrop, being used as a supply vessel for the Royal Navy fleet involved in a naval assault and blockade of the fortified French port of Boulogne-sur-Mer, during the war against Napoleonic France. Knatchbull joined the crew of HMS Revenge from April to June 1805. He was then briefly aboard HMS Zealand, before being transferred to HMS Sybille in July 1805 under Captain Winthrop. Sybille was a frigate-class vessel and was being filled out at Deptford in the period July to November 1805. In April 1806 Knatchbull was appointed as a midshipman, and continued to serve on Sybille until the end of June 1807, mainly patrolling off the Azores and occasionally returning to Plymouth to be refitted.

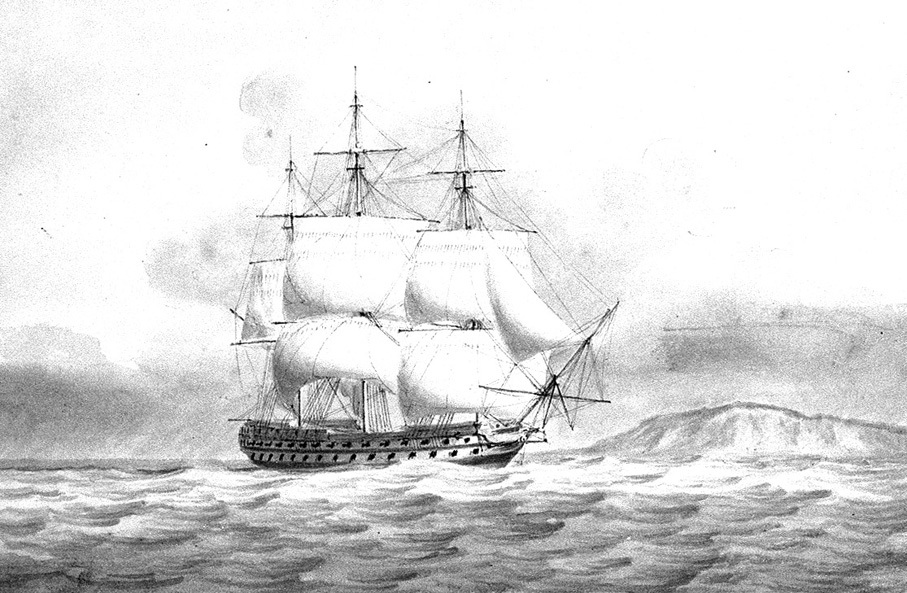
HMS Cumberland at sea

In July 1807 Knatchbull was briefly transferred to HMS Téméraire, a Royal Navy warship renowned for its involvement in the battle of Trafalgar in October 1805. He was aboard HMS Pompée during the British bombardment of Copenhagen and seizure of the Danish fleet in August and September 1807. In November 1807 he served on the hospital ship HMS Matilda, before going on a month's leave. In early January 1808 Knatchbull joined HMS Leonidas under Captain James Dunbar, which was involved in active service in the Mediterranean. He was transferred to HMS Cumberland in November 1808 and served on HMS Ocean from April to July 1809. In July 1809 Knatchbull was transferred to HMS Ajax, a new vessel launched only two months previously. In October Ajax left in a large convoy of ships for the Mediterranean, where it became involved in various actions against French forces, using the port of Mahón on the island of Menorca as a base.

At Mahón in November 1810 Knatchbull passed his examination for promotion to the rank of lieutenant. He was commissioned as acting lieutenant by Sir Charles Cotton, commander-in-chief of the Mediterranean fleet, and appointed to HMS Shearwater, which became engaged in the harassment of enemy forces along the eastern coast of Spain. Knatchbull was confirmed to the rank of lieutenant in December 1810. Knatchbull claimed to have been wounded during his period as a crew-member of Shearwater. In about July 1812 he was given charge of a mortar-boat, a vessel armed with mortars, used for bombarding fixed positions on land. During the bombardment of a French encampment on the Spanish coast the boat was hit by a shell, destroying the vessel and killing several of the crew. Knatchbull was invalided back to England in August 1812 and remained on the sick list until April 1813. He was transferred to the crew of HMS Benbow at Woolwich in mid-May. In November 1813 he was transferred to HMS Queen.

In December 1813, Knatchbull was commissioned to command the sloop HMS Doterel, on service in the West Indies. He left Queen at Portsmouth and obtained a passage for the West Indies aboard Garthland, arriving at Carlisle Bay, Barbados. Upon arrival Knatchbull discovered that Doterel had sailed for Bermuda a week previously. He obtained lodgings in the township, but became bed-ridden with yellow fever. Knatchbull's commission was cancelled in January 1814 and lieutenant Daniel Stow was appointed acting commander of Doterel in his place, during which the vessel engaged in skirmishes against American ships. Knatchbull's own account of his life states that he had joined and taken command of Doterel during this period, but this does not accord with the official records. Naval records indicate that Knatchbull was re-appointed as lieutenant in command of Doterel in early September 1814, when the sloop was being re-fitted at Halifax in Nova Scotia. His command on this occasion was short-lived, as on 28 September Captain Wrayford relieved him of the position and Knatchbull did not resume command of Doterel until 1 January 1815.^{[B]}

In March 1815, Doterel sailed from Halifax to Bermuda, with her officers listed as John Knatchbull (captain) and Daniel Stowe (first lieutenant). After refitting she sailed from Bermuda for the Azores, where she patrolled during April and early May 1815. Doterel arrived back in English waters in mid-May and entered Portsmouth harbour to refit. The battle of Waterloo in June 1815, resulting in the defeat of the French army by coalition forces under the command of the Duke of Wellington, marked the end of the Napoleonic Wars and was a major turning point in Knatchbull's life. After Waterloo the Admiralty undertook a rapid reduction in the Royal Navy. In early September 1815 Knatchbull mustered the crew of Doterel and paid them off. In November the sloop was put out of service and taken from Portsmouth to the Chatham dockyard, with Knatchbull still in command. In December 1815 he was retired on half-pay, receiving thereafter eight shillings and sixpence per day. Knatchbull remained on the list of retired commanders until March 1818.

In April 1817 Thomas Parkin, the British vice-consul at Fayal in the Azores, wrote to the Admiralty to advise them of an unpaid debt owed to him by Knatchbull. The debt had been incurred in April 1815 when Doterel was stationed at the Azores. Knatchbull had persuaded Parkin to supply him with casks of wine, payable by bills upon Knatchbull's agent in London. His agent had refused payment and, after two years of "re-exchange, protests, commission, interest and postage incurred", Parkin was claiming a total debt of £355, payable by the Admiralty. The secretary of the Admiralty wrote to Knatchbull directing him to explain "the charge of so discreditable a nature". Knatchbull replied by claiming part of the debt had been paid, and he would pay the remainder when convenient, as it was "merely a debt of one gentleman to another and not an uncommon thing in the world". In September 1817 Parkin again wrote to the Admiralty, enclosing a demand for payment to be forwarded to Knatchbull. The Admiralty then ordered the navy board to stop Knatchbull's half-pay "until his original debt to the vice-consul shall be discharged". In February 1818 Knatchbull wrote to the Admiralty claiming his debt to Parkin was "an entirely private affair" and asked that his half-pay be resumed. The matter was then re-considered and it was concluded that Knatchbull's "conduct was unbecoming the character of an officer" and his name was removed from the Royal Navy list.

=== Crime and transportation ===
Little is known of Knatchbull's life in the period 1818 to June 1824. His biographer, Colin Roderick, suggests it was unlikely Knatchbull found steady employment during these years, given the large number of unemployed seamen in Britain after the end of the Napoleonic Wars. In his memoirs Knatchbull claims to have fought against the Spanish in South America, with the mercenary forces led by Thomas Cochrane, during the period 1818 and much of 1819. Knatchbull claimed he was involved "in many different engagements under the Venezuelan flag".

Knatchbull's father died on 19 September 1819. Knatchbull's elder half-brother Edward succeeded to the baronetcy and was subsequently elected as a member of parliament for Kent, filling the vacancy caused by his father's death. John Knatchbull, like his many other siblings and half-siblings, received a payment of three hundred pounds under the terms of his father's will. Knatchbull's memoir describes animosity between himself and his eldest half-brother.^{[C]}

In August 1824 Knatchbull was tried, under the name 'John Fitch', with "stealing a pocket-book, and two sovereigns, from the person of John Henry Frederick de Dompierre". The crime, as revealed at his trial, occurred on the evening of 30 June 1824 at a crowded public entertainment and fireworks display held in London at Vauxhall Gardens, on the south bank of the River Thames. During the evening de Dompierre discovered the inside pocket of his coat had been cut and his pocketbook was missing. The pocketbook had contained two sovereigns and a blank cheque. De Dompierre reported the loss to a police officer who already had a suspect in custody after there had been an earlier report of a pickpocketing attempt. The suspected pickpocket gave his name as 'John Fitch'. Upon being searched a blank cheque and a number of coins, including "three or four sovereigns", were found in his pockets. It was believed that 'Fitch' had been operating in concert with a man named Stewart, who was also detained at the event and found to have a knife in his possession.

Knatchbull was tried on 21 August 1824 at the Surrey Assizes in Guildford, south-west of central London, before Justice Burrough. From the report of the proceedings published in The Times, it was apparent that Knatchbull's true identity was known. During Robert Hall's evidence the police officer remarked that he was aware 'Fitch' was not the prisoner's "true name", to which the defence attorney "interrupted the witness by observing, that he need not pursue that subject any further". When Knatchbull spoke in his defence, he claimed to be "as innocent as a child unborn". He described being reared "in the lap of affluence, and after serving for 20 years in an honourable profession, was it to be supposed that he could be so mean, so despicable, so low, as to descend to pick pockets". The jury returned a guilty verdict after deliberating for fifteen minutes. Justice Burrough said that "he had no doubt as to the propriety of the verdict". He added that "he perfectly knew who [the prisoner] was" and then sentenced Knatchbull (Fitch) to transportation for fourteen years.

After the trial Knatchbull was imprisoned on board the hulk Leviathan at Portsmouth. In October he was transferred to the transport vessel Asia, one of 200 convicts to be transported to the colony of New South Wales. Asia departed from Spithead in December 1824 and arrived at Sydney on 29 April 1825.

=== New South Wales ===
After arriving in Australia Knatchbull was initially assigned to a publican at Penrith named Mills, "where he remained for some time". In a document later written by Knatchbull in his condemned cell, he remarked about this period of his life: "formerly he was a Captain in the navy – now a slave". After leaving Mills he went into the service of McHenry at Emu Plains.

During 1825 Knatchbull was transferred to Bathurst, where official records refer to him as "John Fitch" or "John Fitch, alias Knatchbull". He was employed at the Government Establishment, under the supervision of Bathurst's police magistrate Captain John Fennell. In November 1826 Knatchbull was one of nine constables appointed at Bathurst under chief constable James Blackman. He was assigned the task of carrying mail, once a week on foot, between Bathurst and Mount York on the western edge of the Blue Mountains. In March 1829 the bench of magistrates at Bathurst recommended Knatchbull for a ticket-of-leave for the local district. By that stage Knatchbull had been credited with the apprehension of eight runaway convicts, for which consideration was given in the granting of the privilege. In the documentation Knatchbull was described as being of short stature, slightly less than 5 feet 3 inches (159.5 cm), with a ruddy complexion, dark brown hair and blue eyes.

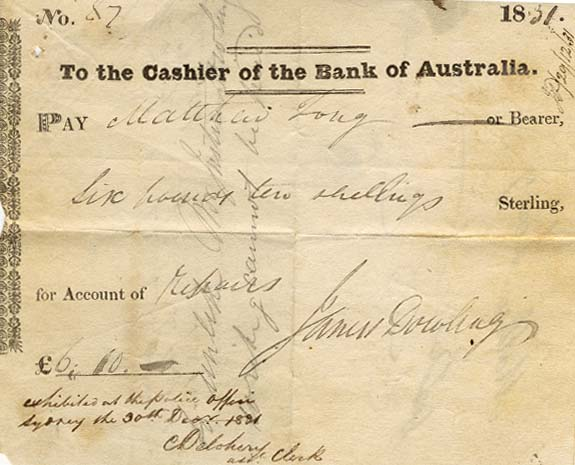
The forged cheque for which Knatchbull was transported to Norfolk Island penal settlement.

In about August 1829 Knatchbull had ceased working as a constable at Bathurst and was residing at Liverpool. The police magistrate at Liverpool, Alexander Kinghorne, requested that Knatchbull's ticket-of-leave be altered for the district of Liverpool, which was so amended in November 1829. For the next two years Knatchbull worked in the Liverpool district. By November 1831 Knatchbull had a job in the Department of Roads and Bridges as overseer of a road gang working on the Parramatta Road, at a locality close to Sydney.

In December 1831 Knatchbull purchased clothes from Charles Bailey's shop in George Street, Sydney, payment for which he tendered a cheque signed by Justice Dowling, to be drawn upon the Bank of Australia. Bailey accepted the cheque but was later informed by the bank that it was a forgery. Bailey later recognised Knatchbull in the market and had him taken into custody. He was tried on 22 February 1832 in the Supreme Court before Justice Stephen, charged with "falsely making, forging, and counterfeiting an order for the payment of money" bearing the signature of James Dowling, "with intent to defraud Charles Bailey". The jury found the prisoner guilty. Knatchbull was initially sentenced to death, which was soon afterwards commuted to incarceration for seven years. He was taken to the prison hulk Phoenix, moored on Sydney Harbour, to await transportation to the penal settlement at Norfolk Island.

Knatchbull remained incarcerated on Phoenix for the next seven months, under the superintendence of Thomas Makeig. Knatchbull resented the harsh conditions on board the prison hulk, and in September 1832 he informed Makeig he wished to write a letter of complaint to the Sheriff of New South Wales, Thomas Macquoid. Makeig the placed him in a solitary cell and provided him with paper, pen and ink. Knatchbull's letter of complaint was sent to Macquoid, together with a covering letter from Makeig accusing Knatchbull of having "a disposition to become troublesome and by his example to create a similar improper spirit among the other prisoners".

Knatchbull left Sydney on 7 October 1832 aboard the Governor Phillip, together with sixty-nine other prisoners being transported to Norfolk Island.

=== Norfolk Island ===
The voyage to the Norfolk Island penal settlement took nine days, during which the prisoners were manacled below deck in the ship. When they arrived at their destination, the officer-in-charge of the military guard, Ensign M. Fortescue, submitted a written report of an attempted mutiny that had occurred aboard Governor Phillip. Fortescue's report named "Knatchbull and four others" as the principal ringleaders of the mutinous activities, though subsequent investigations revealed Knatchbull's role to be that of willing participant rather than an initiator of the conspiracy.

One of the convicts, William Smith, had managed to smuggle poison aboard the government brig prior to her departure from Sydney. He and two others, George Wright and William Taylor, had also managed a procure a serrated knife, with which they began filing their irons as the brig sailed to Norfolk Island. Knatchbull, together with the convicts Alfred Turner and John Jackson, were brought into the conspiracy, with Knatchbull's role to be in charge of sailing the vessel to South America. The plan was for a convict servant named David Hannon to poison the crew and military guard by putting the poison in the coppers used for preparing breakfast. A prisoner named George Topper became aware of the plot and on 12 October, six days into the voyage, as the mutineers were asleep he tore strips of paper from a newspaper and wrote messages revealing details of the plan to be executed the following day. Topper then passed the messages to a soldier. After being informed of the plot Fortescue and four soldiers entered the hold, prompting Alfred Turner to give himself up. Turner was taken before John Hindmarsh, the chief mate of the Governor Phillip, and named Smith, Taylor, Wright and Knatchbull as the ringleaders of the plot.

Upon their arrival on Norfolk Island the commandant of the convict settlement, Lieutenant-Colonel James Morisset, was informed of the attempted mutiny. A week later Morisset convened a court to take evidence from convicts, seamen and soldiers. An examination of the substance found in possession of the ringleaders revealed that it contained arsenic. The depositions were sent to Sydney where the Attorney-General determined that the evidence did not support charges of attempted murder. It was also decided that the return of the prisoners to Sydney was unwarranted to face the misdemeanour charges of conspiracy. Knatchbull and his fellow conspirators became known among their fellow convicts as the "tea-sweeteners".

During 1833 Knatchbull suffered a stroke which left him partially paralysed and requiring crutches to walk for a period of time. His petition to return to Sydney was rejected. Towards the end of 1833 commandant Morisset's health had considerably declined, to the extent that in early January 1834 he relinquished command of the penal settlement and appointed Foster Fyans, who had been captain of the guard on the island since March 1833, as acting commandant.

On the morning of 15 January 1834 an insurrection was attempted on Norfolk Island, according to a pre-arranged plan led by about thirty convicts. Each of the men, from several of the work-gangs, feigned sickness and reported to the hospital at sunrise. As the gaol-gang was being marched to the prison gates, the thirty men rushed from the nearby hospital in an attempt to overcome the guards and seize their weapons. The soldiers fought off their assailants with musket fire and bayonets, and were soon reinforced by soldiers from the nearby barracks. The insurrectionists broke off their attack and ran for the bush, leaving two of their number lying dead and eight badly wounded (three of whom died soon afterwards). Only one of the soldiers was wounded in the melee. In the meantime about fifty convicts had broken out of the Longridge farm and, running towards the settlement, were met by the fleeing convicts carrying only a few muskets. Within three days all of the runaways had been recaptured.

In the following days the acting commandant Foster Fyans began taking depositions from a number of convicts, including Knatchbull. Four of the informants named Knatchbull as being involved in the mutiny, but only as the proposed commander of the Government vessel the mutineers had planned to seize. Knatchbull himself claimed he had told one of the ringleaders: "I did not wish to have anything to do with it, as I thought it nonsense for men to be foolishly led away with such ideas". The new acting commandant, Major Joseph Anderson, who arrived on Norfolk Island in early April 1834 when the investigation and collection of evidence was still underway, had a very low opinion of Knatchbull. In Anderson's autobiography (published posthumously) he describes Knatchbull as a "a desperate and cowardly villain" who was "foremost in every crime which promised him a chance of escape, yet when detected always turned King’s evidence". Anderson claimed that Knatchbull had "an extraordinary influence" over his fellow convicts, not least because "he was the only one of them who understood navigation". In the end Knatchbull was not brought to trial. Fifty-four convicts were charged with conspiracy and assault and tried in June 1834 before Justice William Burton at a special sitting of the Supreme Court on the island. Twenty-nine of the number were singled out as having principal roles in the insurrection and sentenced to death. Sixteen had their sentences commuted and in September 1834 the remaining thirteen mutineers were hanged.

In November 1836 Rev. Thomas Atkins, an Independent clergyman, was sent to Norfolk Island as a chaplain on the recommendation of the London Missionary Society. By that stage Knatchbull was employed on the island as a stonemason. Atkins later wrote of Knatchbull: "... from his personal appearance and conversation, as all traces of a gentleman had long disappeared, he exhibited no external or internal evidence that he had ever been in a higher social position; indeed he appeared to be in his natural place".

In May 1838 Knatchbull petitioned Governor Gipps for remission of the last nine months of his colonial sentence. In his covering dispatch Major Anderson stated that the petitioner's conduct "has been good" and mentioned Knatchbull's "present bad state of health, & former station in life". However, Gipps was unmoved by the petition and Knatchbull served out his full sentence on Norfolk Island. He arrived back in Sydney on 2 May 1839 where he was lodged in Sydney Gaol. A week later he and eleven other prisoners with expired sentences from Norfolk Island were transferred to Hyde Park Barracks "for the purpose of being identified".

=== Port Macquarie and Sydney ===
Knatchbull's colonial sentence of seven years was not concurrent with his original imperial sentence. His years on Norfolk Island was therefore additional to his original sentence of fourteen years, of which in 1839 he had six years yet to serve. In 1839, due to his poor health, Knatchbull was sent to Port Macquarie as an invalid. He was stationed at the hospital establishment with a small number of other convicts, performing day-to-day tasks and repairing local roads, supervised by the police magistrate William Nairn Gray and the superintendent of convicts, Stephen Partridge. In 1840 Knatchbull was placed in charge of the punt crossing the Hastings River, on the newly-established route north to the New England district. In July 1842 he received a ticket-of-leave for the Port Macquarie district.

In 1843 Knatchbull wrote to Governor Gipps requesting an alteration in his ticket-of-leave to enable him to trade between Sydney and Port Macquarie as an employee of Thomas Lewis, the owner of a coasting vessel, the cutter Harriet. In July 1843 his ticket-of-leave was altered to include Sydney, "so long as he remains in the service of Mr. Thomas Lewis". Knatchbull worked for Lewis operating the cutters Harriet and Waterwitch. By the end of 1843, however, Lewis had become insolvent and the ownership of the vessels passed to his creditors, leaving Knatchbull out of work.

From about mid-December 1843 Knatchbull was lodging at the house of Clarence Hollowell in Clarence Lane in Sydney. He told Hollowell that he owned the Harriet coaster and was waiting for the vessel to be sold in order to pay for his lodging. Knatchbull had formed a relationship with a young widowed servant named Harriet Craig. He proposed marriage to Harriet and in December 1843 induced her to leave her service (claiming that he was unwilling "that it should be known by his respectable relations in England that he had married a servant-girl") and live at the house where he was lodging. Knatchbull brought a wedding dress for his bride-to-be, but otherwise lacked money to pay for wedding expenses.^{[D]}

=== Murder ===
On the evening of Saturday, 6 January 1844, John Shalless observed a man acting suspiciously, lurking in the vicinity of a small shop at the corner of Kent Street and Margaret Place in Sydney, where a widow named Ellen Jamieson lived with her two children. Shalless, a builder, lived nearby and he watched from his verandah as the man, later identified as John Knatchbull, entered the shop after a customer left at about ten o'clock. Soon afterwards Shalless saw the door being slammed shut and heard "a noise of something falling... on the floor". Fearing that violence had occurred, he ran to the front door and found it locked, but heard "some strokes given as of some one breaking a coconut with a hammer". He heard no further noise, but saw a light move about upstairs. Knatchbull momentarily appeared at the upper window, looking out at the street.

Shalless "gave an alarm" to a local watchman and then returned to the shop and roused the neighbours. While some watched the front, Shalless and others, armed with sticks, broke open the back door and entered the premises. Ellen Jamieson was found "lying insensible, covered with blood, which was flowing profusely from some wounds in her head". The grocer, Alfred Jaques, reported lifting Mrs. Jamieson and seeing "her skull was fractured, and a part of the brain protruding". They found Knatchbull standing behind the front door. He offered no resistance and as he was being secured, called out several times "O! don't strike me". Constable Norton from the nearby police station arrived on the scene, handcuffed the prisoner and took him away. Mrs. Jamieson's two children were found upstairs, crying in their bed. A doctor was summoned and Mrs. Jamieson was moved upstairs to her bed. The neighbours spent several hours searching for the weapon. It was eventually found by Mrs. Jaques, stowed between the battens and the mattress of Mrs. Jamieson's bed. The weapon used by Knatchbull was a tomahawk, found with fresh blood and hairs adhering to it.

At the police station Knatchbull was searched by inspector Molloy. Cash in notes and silver, amounting to just over seventeen pounds, was found on him, as well as three bills of exchange of fifty pounds each, directed to the prisoner's half-brother Sir Edward Knatchbull. Some of the cash was within a woman's pocket, apparently torn away by force. Splatters of blood were found on Knatchbull's trousers and boots.

Ellen Jamieson was cared for by neighbours but, after eleven days, she succumbed to her severe wounds. She died on the morning of 18 January. On the morning of her death a coronial inquest was held at McKenzie's public house on the corner of Clarence Street and Margaret Place. After the witnesses had given evidence and the prisoner allowed to cross-examine them, the Coroner summarised the case and complimented John Shalless "for the praiseworthy manner in which he had acted". After "a minute's consultation" the jury returned a verdict of "wilful murder" against Knatchbull, who was committed for trial. During the inquest several hundred people had gathered outside McKenzie's public house. As Knatchbull was brought outside and put into a hackney-coach, to be conveyed to gaol, the crowd "expressed their detestation of the culprit" by hissing and hooting at the prisoner.

=== Trial ===
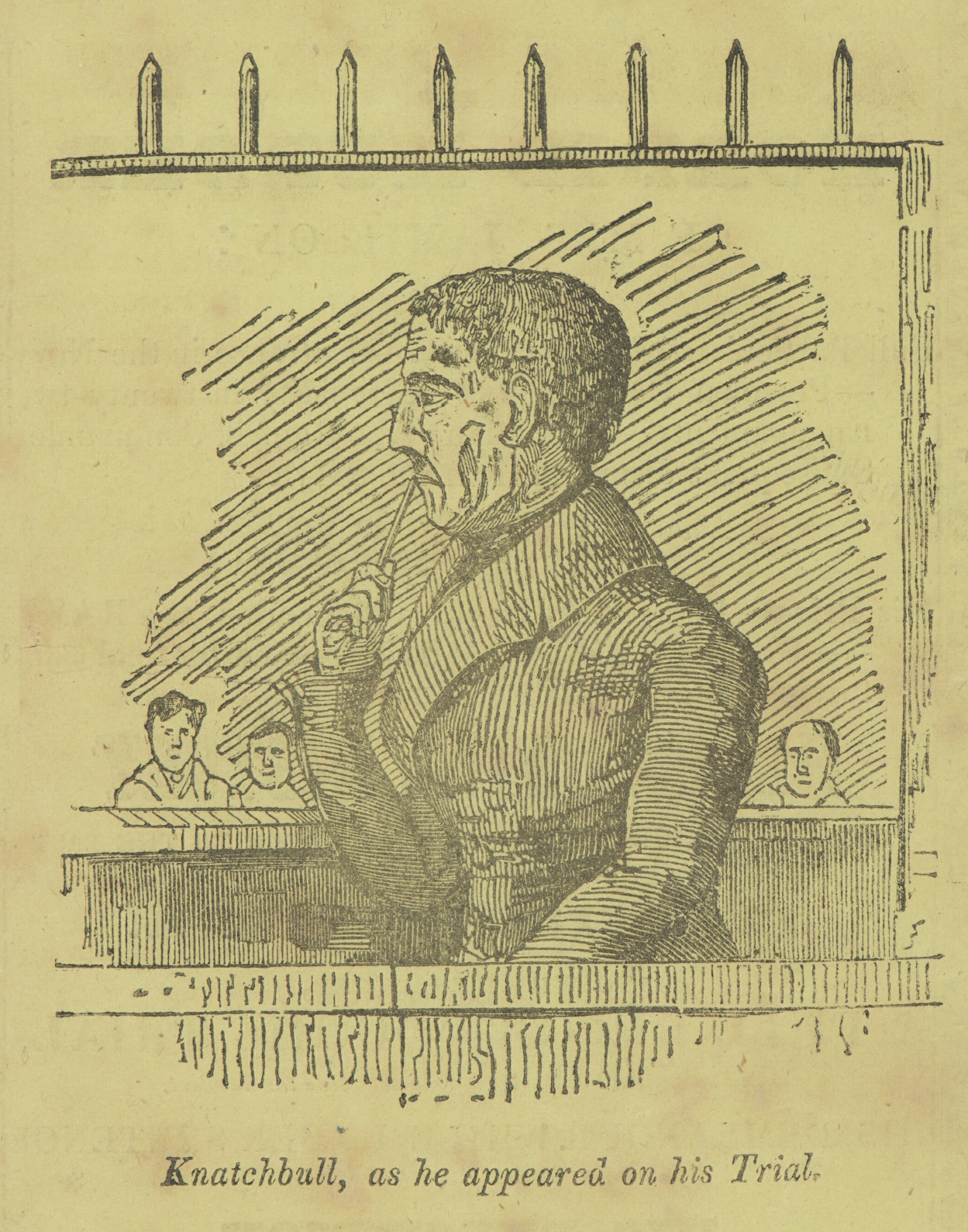
"Knatchbull, as he appeared on his Trial", published in The Life of J. Knatchbull (1844).

On Wednesday, 24 January 1844 Knatchbull was tried before Justice William Burton for the wilful murder of Ellen Jamieson by "inflicting diverse mortal wounds". He had been charged as "John Fitch alias John Knatchbull", but his defence counsel Robert Lowe requested an amendment to the indictment recording that the prisoner's name was 'John Knatchbull' only. After the indictment was amended, Knatchbull pleaded "not guilty".

Prosecution of the case was carried out by the Attorney-General, John Plunkett, who began by describing the circumstances of the murder. He then called witnesses who gave evidence similar to that given at the coroner's inquest. After the prosecution case had been presented, the barrister Robert Lowe rose to address the jury and present the case for the defence, arguing that Knatchbull had yielded to an irresistible impulse and could not be held responsible for his crime. He began by describing in detail a phrenological analysis of the workings of the human brain to support his argument that Knatchbull had committed the murder while in a state of "moral insanity". Lowe asserted that, because "the prisoner was of a noble family" his "self-created vicissitudes" could only have come about by "some mental infirmity which paralysed his better nature". During his address Lowe referred to the recent McNaghten case in England, in which the murderer of Sir Robert Peel's private secretary was acquitted on the ground of insanity. The case had led to the formulation of a set of legal prescriptions for the defence of insanity, known as the McNaghten Rules. Lowe concluded by urging the jury to carefully consider whether "they could believe that a man with the great advantages originally possessed by the prisoner could have fallen, step by step, into the lowest depths of disgrace, unless urged on by some resistless demon of insanity".

In summing up Justice Burton commented that the doctrine asserted by the defence, that the crime had been committed "through the influence of an over-powering internal impulse", was the first of its kind "he had ever heard... broached in a Court of Justice". He noted the fact that no witnesses had been called to support a plea of insanity and stated that the money found on Knatchbull was sufficient as "a probable motive for his conduct". The jury, "without leaving the box", returned a verdict of guilty. Justice Burton then pronounced a sentence of death upon the prisoner.

Five days after the trial Knatchbull's counsel, Robert Lowe, submitted a petition to the Supreme Court claiming that the sentence was illegal because the judge had "omitted to express that the body of the prisoner should be dissected and anatomized", or alternatively "should be buried within the precincts of the prison". The Supreme Court judges delivered their verdict on 1 February, rejecting the premise of Lowe's petition.

During his incarceration Knatchbull wrote his version of the story of his life, which he titled 'Life of John Knatchbull written by himself', a project he initially began with the hope of escaping the gallows. The governor of Woolloomooloo Gaol, Henry Keck, enabled the prisoner to write his autobiography by supplying him with paper and ink. The narrative was completed on the morning of his execution.

=== Execution ===
In the days leading to Knatchbull's execution on 13 February 1844 a printing office in King Street advertised a lithographic print of sketches of both John Knatchbull and his victim, Ellen Jamieson, on sale for one shilling. The sketch of the murderer by the artist C. Rodius was claimed to be "the only correct likeness of Knatchbull now published". At least one other printed likeness of Knatchbull was also being sold in Sydney at the time. A writer for the Sydney Morning Herald commented: "To preserve the portraits of the virtuous is an excellent way of keeping them in remembrance, but we do not approve of any thing likely to perpetuate the memory of such a man as Knatchbull; the sooner he is forgotten the better".

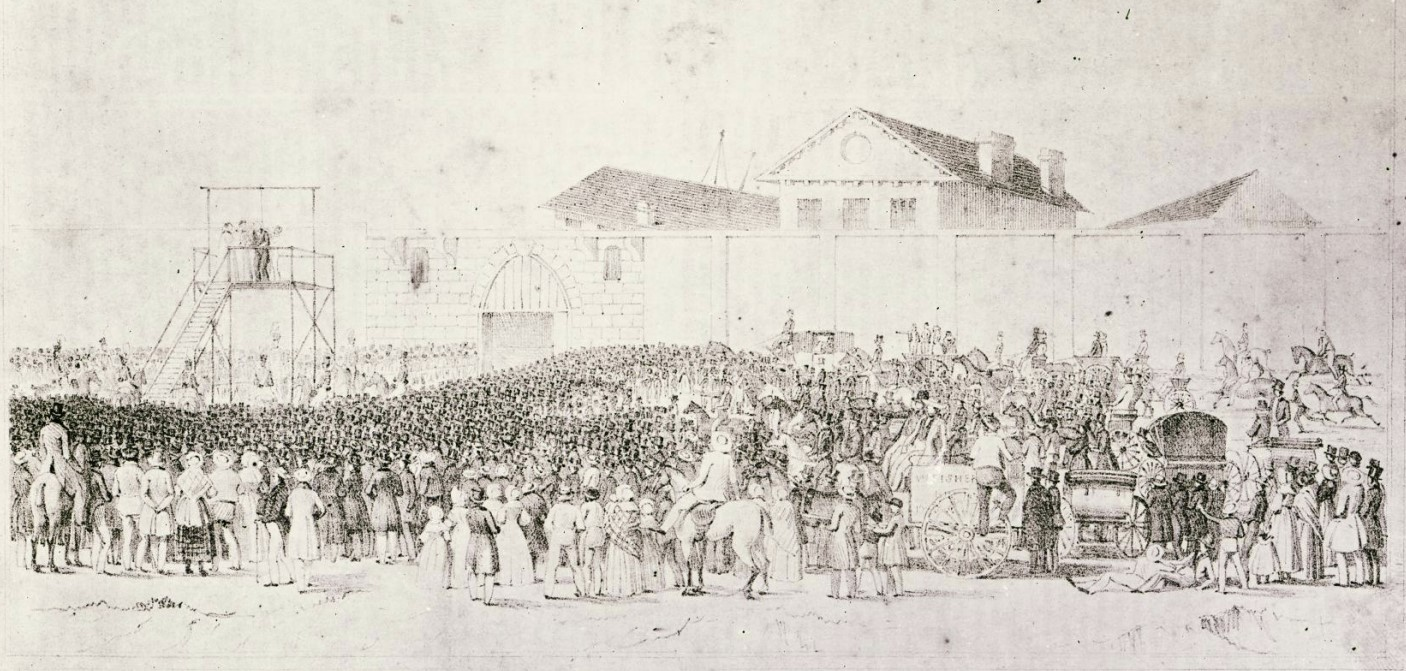
The crowd at the execution of John Knatchbull outside Darlinghurst Gaol.

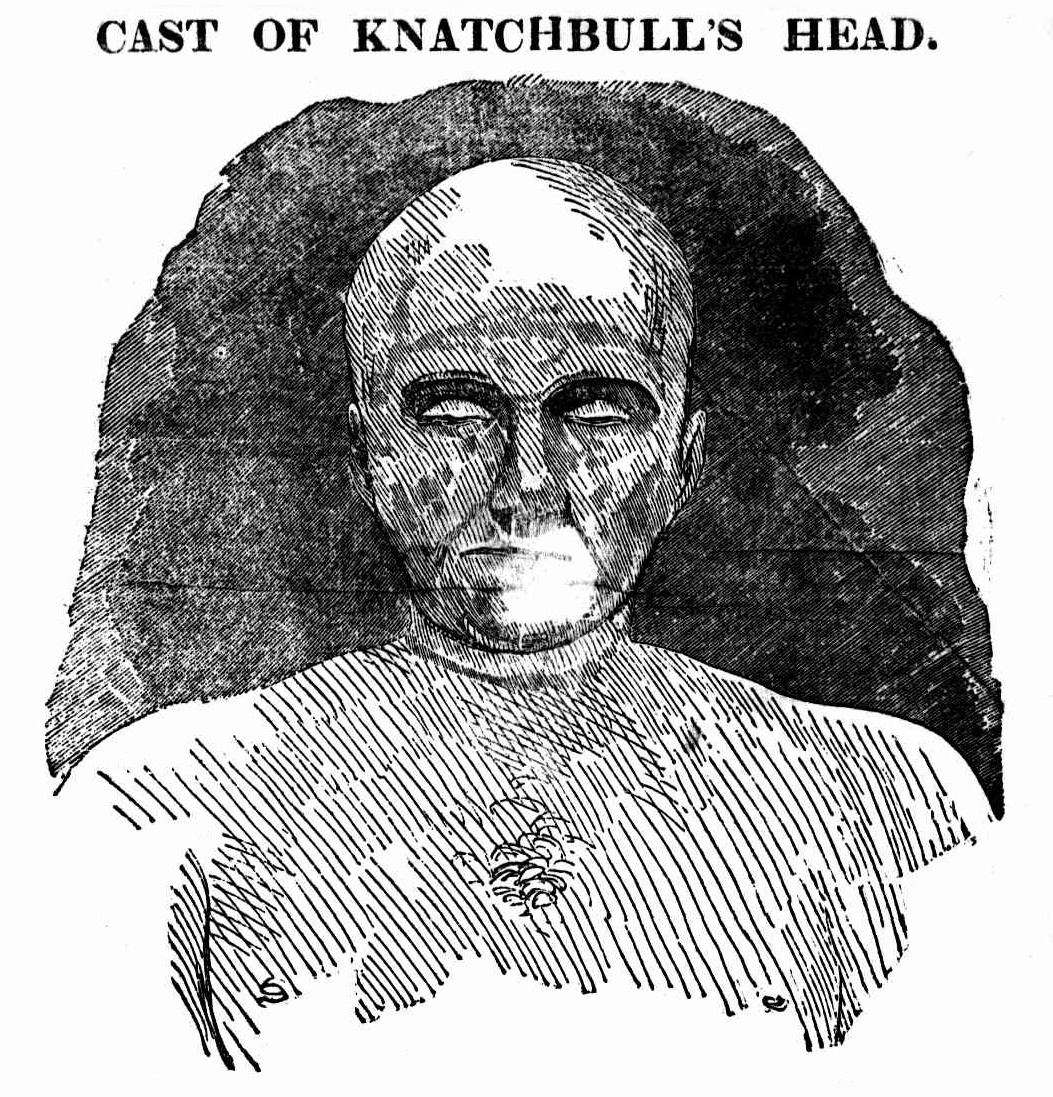
'Cast of Knatchbull's Head' (woodcut print), published on 28 February 1844.

On 7 February Knatchbull was examined by two medical practitioners and pronounced to be sane. On the following day an attorney, Parry Long, delivered a submission on Knatchbull's behalf to the Governor, requesting that a petition be sent to Queen Victoria appealing against his sentence. On 10 February the prisoner was informed his appeal had been ineffective and the execution would be carried out on the day announced. Later that day Knatchbull confessed to having murdered Ellen Jamieson. His admission was in the presence of Rev. Robert Ross, minister of the Pitt Street Congregational Church, Henry Keck, governor of Darlinghurst Gaol, and the magistrate Joseph Long Innes. He also signed a written confession which included the following: "I am Guilty of the Horrid Deed for which I am justly to suffer Death".

On the morning of 13 February 1844 a large crowd, estimated to number ten thousand, gathered on Darlinghurst Hill around the high gallows constructed outside the north gate of Darlinghurst Gaol. At nine o'clock the prisoner emerged from his cell. His appearance was described as "wan and deathlike, and told loudly of the agonies under which his mind had been labouring". He was dressed in a mourning suit, with black gloves and a white handkerchief in his hand (not the sort of apparel "which condemned criminals are usually executed"). His ascent to the scaffold was assisted by the executioner. The noose was adjusted around Knatchbull's neck and "amidst the suspended pulsations of the gazing thousands, the fatal bolt was drawn". The journalist for The Dispatch newspaper observed that the knot of the noose had slipped around the back of the prisoner's neck "and the struggles of expiring strength were long and painful". The crowd observed the execution "in painful and breathless silence... and when the awful scene was over... the mass of the people quietly dispersed".

In the hours after Knatchbull's death a cast of his head was taken "for phrenological purposes". It appears that an artist employed by The True Sun was present during this process. On 28 February 1844 a wood-cut image of Knatchbull, "two hours after his execution" and with a shaven head, was published in the newspaper.

On the morning following his execution Knatchbull's coffin was loaded into a "hearse and mourning coach" at Darlinghurst Gaol. The hearse proceeded to "the Dissenting burial ground". The coffin, with a metal plate bearing the plain inscription, "John Knatchbull, aged fifty-six", was deposited in a prepared grave. The Congregational minister Rev. Ross performed the service, attended by "two gentlemen and two ladies in deep mourning". There was also "a third female, in black, who did not, however, appear to be connected with the other mourners".

The first published account of Knatchbull's life appeared in Sydney's The Dispatch newspaper on 3 February 1844, ten days before its subject was hanged. The account in The Dispatch was expanded and published four days after Knatchbull's execution by a rival newspaper, The True Sun, as a 26-page booklet selling for sixpence. Since then numerous versions of Knatchbull's life have been published, drawing upon the material printed in The Dispatch and the subsequent expanded booklet, depicting Knatchbull (in Colin Roderick's words) "as a monster of bloody appetites and capacious habits".

== The victim ==
- Ellen Jamieson (born in about 1809; maiden name unknown) was married to Robert Jamieson (born in about 1806), a native of Glasgow in west central Scotland . Her husband worked as a steward on the Rose steamer. The couple had two children: Mary (known as 'Polly', born in about 1837) and Robert ('Bobby'). Ellen's husband, Robert Jamieson, died on 17 December 1842, aged 36. The widowed Ellen Jamieson was aged 35 when she was murdered by John Knatchbull in January 1844.

== The Jamieson children ==
After the murder of Mrs. Jamieson a committee was formed for the purpose of collecting subscriptions for the benefit of her two orphaned children. Members of the committee included the Presbyterian minister Rev. John Dunmore Lang and John Shalless, the man whose vigilance was responsible for the swift apprehension of Knatchbull the murderer. Lang made arrangements for the two children to be cared for by a school-master, who was a member of Lang's Presbyterian congregation.

In early March 1844 Robert Lowe, Knatchbull's defence attorney, successfully petitioned the Supreme Court to be appointed guardian of the orphaned Jamieson children. After the court decision Lowe's guardianship of the children was bitterly attacked in the press by Rev. Lang, accusing Lowe of having attempted to "screen a murderer from justice". Lang was outraged that Lowe had been appointed "the legal guardian of the orphaned children of that murderer's victim". He described Lowe's tactic of claiming that Knatchbull murdered Ellen Jamieson while in a state of "moral insanity" as "the most monstrous plea for crime that was ever submitted to a Court of Justice".

In January 1845 Lowe's wife Georgiana wrote in a letter: "Poor little Mary and Bobby (the children of Mrs. Jamieson) are very good, and give no trouble". In a reference to the children's lower class origins, she added: "Bobby gave some symptoms of original sin the other day, and Robert whipped him, which had a most excellent effect". The children's position in the Lowe household was ambiguous, with a status somewhere between adopted children and servants. An article in 1907 about the Lowe's house at Bronte included a recollection of dinner parties at the residence "when the tables groaned under the weight of viands... and Mr. Robert Lowe would carve the saddle of mutton at one end of the table, whilst his wife manipulated a pair of turkeys at the other". The account continued: "Behind her chair, in readiness to wait, would stand the little boy Bobby, whom the Lowes adopted, the son of the murdered Mrs. Jamieson, while his little sister Polly stood behind her master's chair". Robert Lowe's biographer, James Winter, wrote: "Both of the Lowes, and especially Georgiana, were insecure about social position; they seem to have regulated their affection for the children by their sense of what was appropriate to children of such humble origin and unfortunate background". In a letter to England Georgiana Lowe wrote that "the little girl is a favourite with Robert; she reads for him if I am engaged, and is not only clever, but an exceedingly good child... and sensible as a grown-up person". Georgiana added that Polly "talks to her brother and comforts him if he cries as though she were his mother".

In late January 1850 Robert and Georgiana Lowe, together with "their young charges", the orphaned Jamieson children, left Sydney aboard the Kate for England.

The fates of the two Jamieson children are uncertain, with the various accounts from Robert Lowe's biographers being contradictory. Patchett Martin wrote in 1893 that Polly died soon after arriving in England, aged thirteen. An "excellent appointment was obtained" for Bobby, "but he abandoned it without reason". After "various vicissitudes" Robert Jamieson "went to New Zealand and served for a while in the colonial forces against the Maoris" (possibly the First Taranaki War from March 1860 to March 1861 or the Second Taranaki War from 1863 to 1866). Jamieson then returned to England. Martin wrote: "like the proverbial bad coin, he came back and was a source of much trouble and anxiety to his benefactors". It was in reference to Bobby that Lowe was reported to have remarked: "What evil that I have done has ever been visited upon me like this one good action?". In complete contrast, James Winter's 1976 biography of Robert Lowe records that Bobby "died young and in an asylum" (having possibly been "scarred by his gruesome experience in infancy") and Polly probably married at a young age and returned to Australia.

== Notes ==
A.Knatchbull's father, Edward Knatchbull, was a member of parliament for Kent and New Romney. Edward Knatchbull married three times: (1) Mary (née Hugesson); (2) Frances (née Graham); (3) Mary (née Hawkins). He fathered at least twenty children.

B.According to Knatchbull's own account of this period, after recovering from yellow fever on Barbados in January 1814, he obtained a passage to Bermuda aboard the sloop Chidres, only to find Doterel had departed two days previously. He then sailed aboard HMS Lacedaemonian, under Captain Jackson, and joined with Doterel off Cape Hatteras, and "upon going on board, I read my commission and took command". By Knatchbull's account Lacedaemonian and Doterel patrolled the sea-lanes in the vicinity of Cape Hatteras (off North Carolina) for six months. On one occasion, while Lacedaemonian had returned to Bermuda to replenish provisions, Doterel joined with the sloop Morgiana for an attack on ships at the port of Wilmington in North Carolina. In a later confrontation with four American schooners off Nova Scotia, Doterel suffered casualties to her crew and damage to the vessel, and retired to Halifax for repairs. In about August 1814 Knatchbull claimed that he was ordered to join the assault on Baltimore and Washington under Major-General Robert Ross. Knatchbull claimed to have participated in the attack on Washington that resulted in the extensive burning of public buildings. After the short-lived attack on Washington, Knatchbull claimed he was part of Major-General Pakenham's ill-fated attack on New Orleans in late 1814.

C.Knatchbull's memoir describes hostility between himself and his eldest half-brother, and includes a fanciful story that it was Edward who was responsible for him being charged with the crime that led him to be transported to New South Wales. Knatchbull claimed to have contested his father's will, describing how he faced "a cruel and barbarous brother who tried all he could to wrong me out of that property which my father left me by will". According to his account, he was forced into law, which was eventually arbitrated in his favour after a period of four years. Knatchbull wrote that his dissatisfied elder brother supposedly then "formed a plan for my ruin". With the "assistance of emissaries", Edward "got me apprehended and convicted for a piece of blank paper, which was sworn that I abstracted from his lawyers". Knatchbull was then tried, convicted and sentenced to fourteen years transportation on this charge, elaborately concocted by his "cruel" brother (rather than the actual stealing of a pocketbook in a crowded public place, as described in the above article).

D.After Knatchbull's execution Harriet Craig appeared before Roger Therry, Commissioner of the Court of Requests in Sydney, pleading exemption from a debt of five shillings for one month's board and lodging. She admitted the debt was due, but sought exemption on the ground that the debt was due by Knatchbull. Harriet provided sworn testimony regarding her relationship with Knatchbull and his promise to pay for her board and lodging prior to their marriage. The landlady, to whom the debt was due, confirmed the details "but contended that, as Knatchbull had been executed on the previous Monday, the servant-girl was the only party to whom she could look for payment". Therry allowed the debt to be exempted "much to the discomfiture of the aggrieved landlady".

== See also ==
- List of convicts transported to Australia
