= Marks Hall =

Country house in Essex, UK

Coordinates: 51.8968°N 0.6732°E

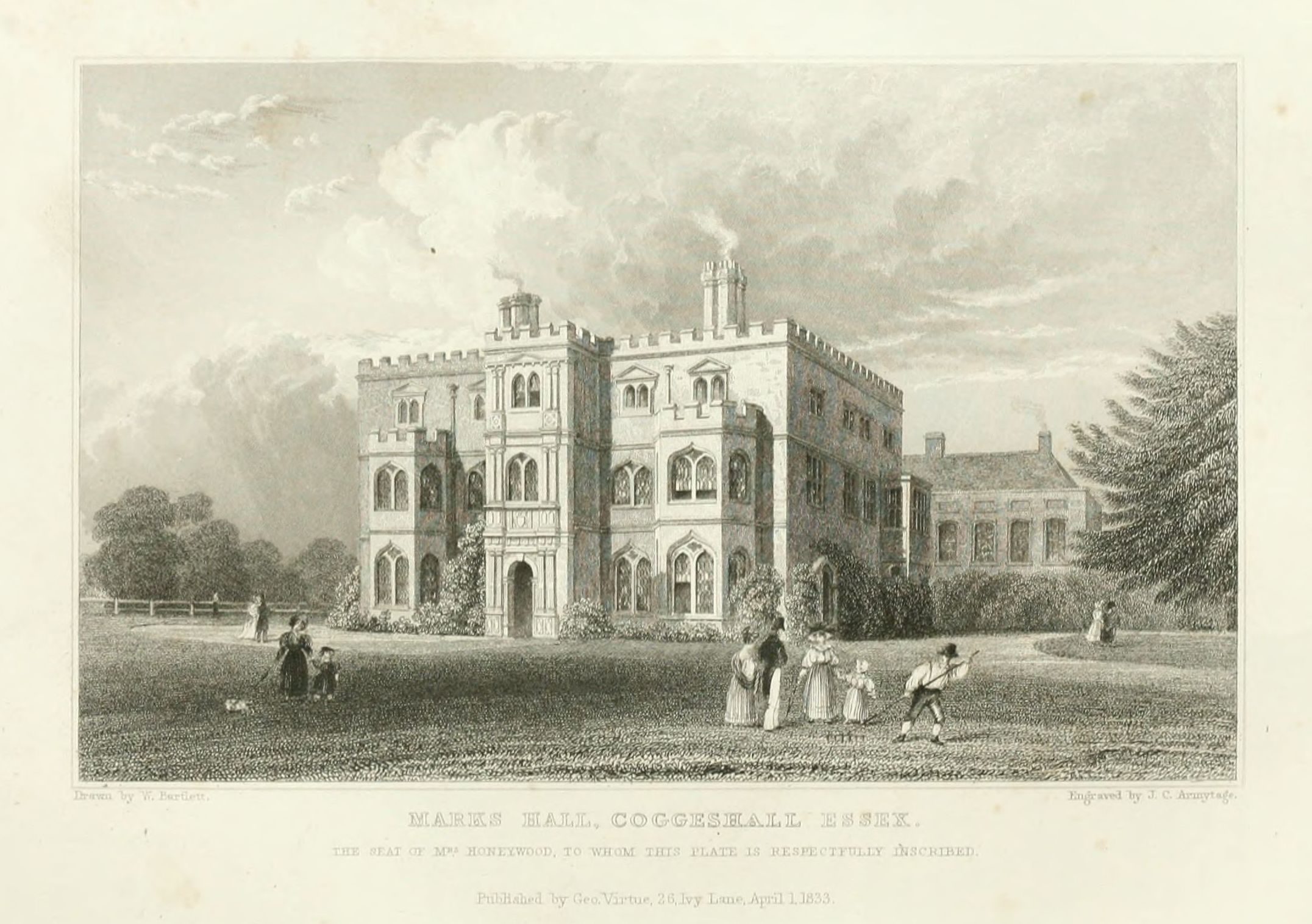
Marks Hall in the 19th century

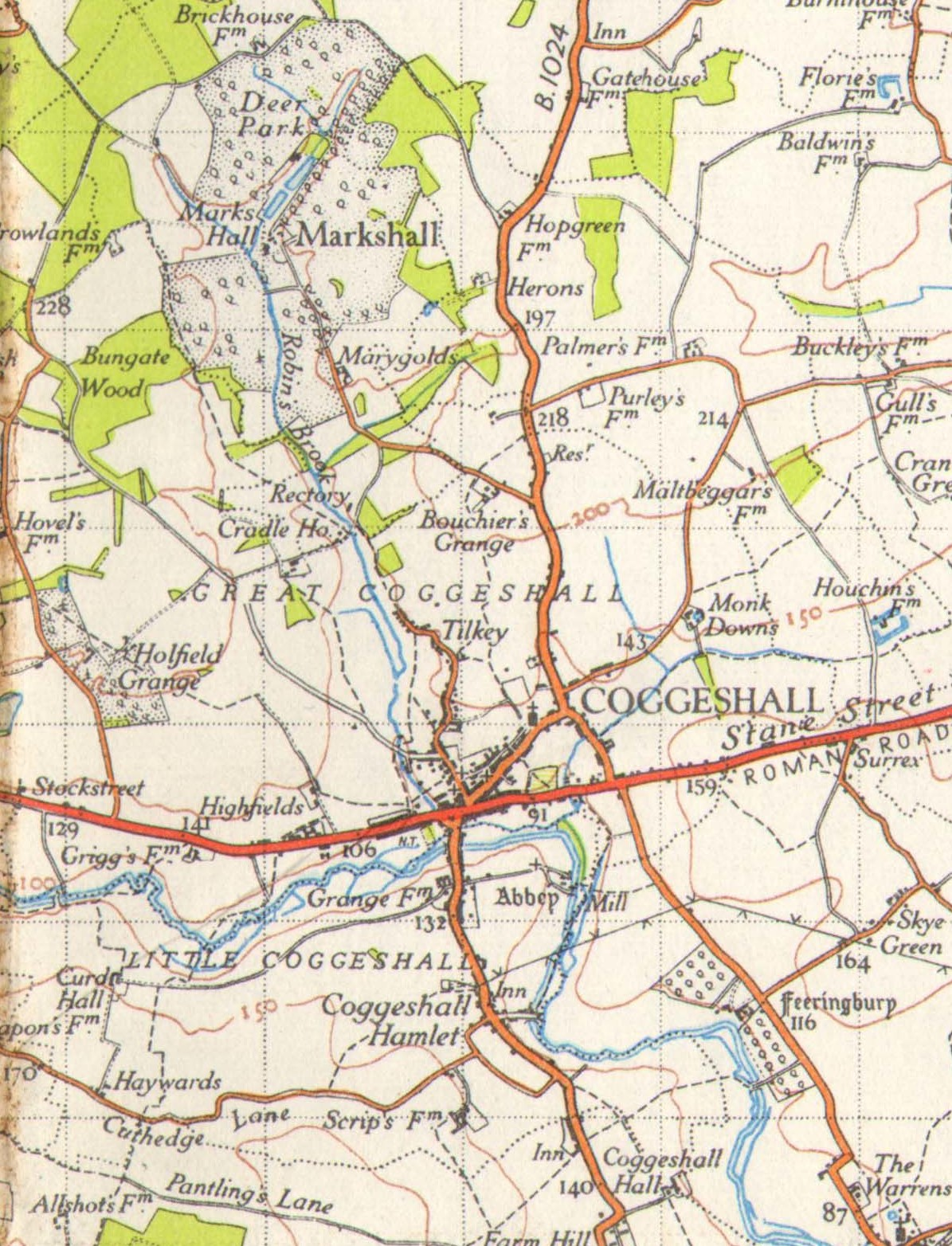
1946 Ordnance Survey map showing Coggeshall at centre, and Marks Hall to its north

Marks Hall, also known as Markshall, was a Jacobean country house some 2 miles (3.2 km) north of Coggeshall in Essex, England. Previously a timber manor house, the 17th-century brick building was demolished in 1950, but the Marks Hall Estate remains the site of gardens and an arboretum.

== History ==
In the Domesday Book of 1086, Markshall is listed as Mercheshala, a manor in Lexden hundred of Essex. A church dedicated to St Margaret was built adjoining the manor house in medieval times, and so Markshall also became a small parish, covering just the 813 acres (329 hectares) immediately around the parkland of the manor house.

In 1163 the manor was granted to the Markshall family after being confiscated from Hugh de Essex. They descended in the Markshall family until the estate was sold to John Cole, who renovated parts of the house. It was then sold to Edward Deraugh in 1581. In 1605 Robert Honywood purchased Marks Hall from Deraugh's grandson, William, pulled down part of the old timber-framed house and built a new brick building in 1609.

The estate then descended in the Honywood family to John Lamotte Honywood who, dying childless by suicide in 1694, left it to his cousin Robert. Robert, the MP for Essex, modernised the house and died in 1735. It was inherited by Robert's second son, grandson, and then his fifth son, Philip. After Philip's death in 1785, and his wife, Elizabeth, sometime later, the estate passed to Philip's distant cousin, Filmer Honywood, the MP for Kent. When Filmer died childless, it passed to his half-nephew, William Honywood and then through his descendants, through to his grandson, William Philip, eldest son of William Philip Honywood. The younger William Philip's widow, Frances Emma, remained at Marks Hall until she died in 1895; after which, the estate passed to Philip Courtenay Honywood, who was the son of Sir Courtenay Honywood, 7th baronet, and the godson of William Philip.

Thomas Phillips Price (1844-1932), a Welsh landowner, mine owner, and Liberal politician, purchased Marks Hall, then a mansion and deer park, at auction in 1898. He made provision in his Will to leave the Marks Hall estate to the nation in the interest of agriculture, arboriculture and forestry. During the Second World War, Earls Colne Airfield was built on the edge of the deer park and much of the property requisitioned for used as the headquarters for a number of local airfields. The 97th Bombardment Wing headquarters was initially located at the manor. By 1949, the mansion was neglected and said to be in a dangerous state, and was demolished in 1950.

The ecclesiastical parish was united with Coggeshall in 1932, and the church of St Margaret, which had been rebuilt in the 18th century, was demolished the following year. The civil parish was similarly abolished in 1949 to become part of Coggeshall.

== Gardens ==
The Marks Hall Estate is now the site of gardens with an arboretum and a tea room.
