= Robert Honywood (cricketer) =

English cricketer

Personal information
- Full name: Robert Honywood
- Born: 6 April 1825; Marks Hall, Essex, England
- Died: 25 December 1870 (aged 45); Westminster, London, England
- Batting: Unknown

Domestic team information
- Years: Team
- 1845–1847: Oxford University

Career statistics
Competition	First-class
Matches	7
Runs scored	88
Batting average	6.76
100s/50s	–/–
Top score	18
Catches/stumpings	1/–
- Source: Cricinfo, 9 April 2020

Robert Honywood (6 April 1825 – 25 December 1870) was an English first-class cricketer.

The son of the politician William Philip Honywood, he was born at Marks Hall in Essex in April 1825. He was educated at Eton College, before going up to Trinity College, Oxford. While studying at Oxford, he played first-class cricket for Oxford University from 1845–47, making seven appearances. He scored 88 runs in his seven appearances, at an average of 6.76 and a high score of 18. Honywood died at Westminster in December 1870.
