= Oxon Hoath =

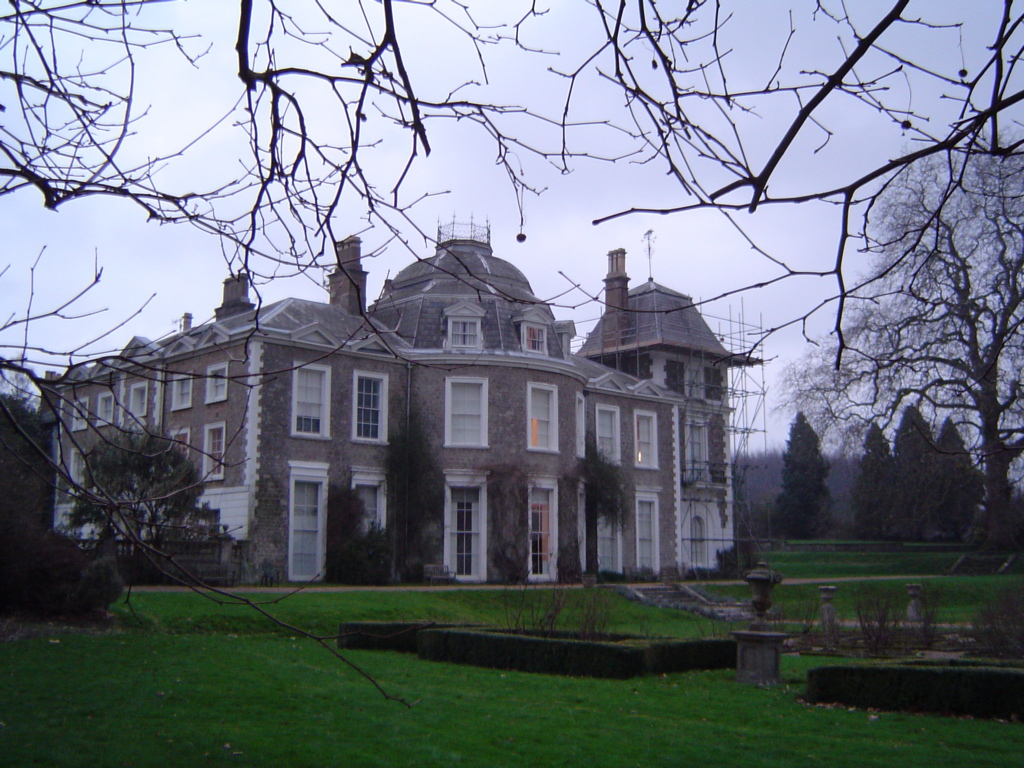
- Oxon Hoath, showing the mansard dome

- Location within Kent
- Alternative names: Oxenhoath, Oxen Hoath, Oxonhoath

General information
- Type: Manor house
- Architectural style: Châteauesque
- Location: West Peckham, Kent, UK
- Coordinates: 51°14′43″N 0°20′05″E
- Construction started: c.1372
- Renovated: 1757, 1846, 1878

Technical details
- Floor count: 3

Renovating team
- Architects: Anthony Salvin (1846); Burn and McVicar Anderson (1878)
- Other designers: William Andrews Nesfield (landscaping, 1846)

Website
- www.oxonhoath.co.uk/

Oxon Hoath is a Grade II* listed Châteauesque-style former manor house with 73 acres (29½ hectares) of grounds at West Peckham, Kent. The spellings Oxenhoath, Oxen Hoath and Oxonhoath are common alternatives. The manor is a former royal deer park. Oxon Hoath has been the seat of two baronetcies, and of five High Sheriffs of Kent. It has a surviving example of parterre gardens in its grounds.

== History ==
Oxon Hoath was built by Sir John Culpeper during the reign of King Edward III, as a Royal Park for oxen and deer. The Culpepers had been in West Peckham since around 1355; a date of 1372 is claimed for the house. On Sir John's death in 1416, the manor passed to his son Sir William Culpeper, who was High Sheriff of Kent in 1426–27. On Sir William's death, the manor passed to his son Sir Richard Culpeper. Richard died without male issue in 1484, and his estate passed to his daughters Elizabeth, Joyce, and Margaret. Oxon Hoath passed to Margaret's husband, William Cotton. On his death, Oxon Hoath passed to his son Sir Thomas Cotton, who alienated the estate to John Chowne of Fairlawne, Plaxtol.

Oxon Hoath then passed to Nicholas Miller of Wrotham, and on his death in 1640 to his son Sir Nicholas Miller, who enlarged the house. On the death of Sir Nicholas in 1658, the estate passed to his son Humphry Miller who died in 1709. The estate then passed to his son Sir Borlase Miller. Upon his death in 1714, Oxon Hoath passed to his sister Elizabeth Bartholomew, and via her, to her husband Leonard Bartholomew. On his death in 1720, the estate passed to his son Philip Bartholomew, who died in 1730. Oxon Hoath then passed to his son Philip, who died in 1757 and left the estate to William Geary, second son of Sir Francis Geary of Polesden Lacey, Great Bookham, Surrey.

Oxon Hoath was remodelled in 1757. In 1846 Sir William Geary commissioned the mansard dome and château tower from Anthony Salvin. The grounds were landscaped in the style of Capability Brown by William Andrews Nesfield. Further additions were made to the house in 1878 by Burn and MacVicar Anderson, who added a billiard room on the east side of the house. The manor remained in the Geary family, passing from Sir William to Sir William Richard Geary in 1825, then to Sir Francis Geary in 1877 and to Sir William Neville Geary in 1895. Sir William Neville Geary died on 26 December 1944.

Oxon Hoath was listed on 1 August 1952. Other structures connected with the estate were listed on 19 April 1985. As of 2010, Oxonhoath is used as an open retreat centre. The main house is listed as Grade II*, The entrance wall and gate to the kitchen garden are listed as Grade II, as are the north, south, east, and west gates; and the gatehouse at the west gate. Oxon Hoath survives as the only unaltered parterre gardens in England.

== Baronetcies ==
Oxon Hoath has been the seat for two separate Baronetcies:

- Miller, (1660–1714)
  - Sir Humphrey Miller, 1st Baronet
  - Sir Borlase Miller, 2nd Baronet
- Geary, (1796–1944)
  - Sir William Geary, 2nd Baronet
  - Sir William Richard Powlett Geary, 3rd Baronet
  - Sir Francis Geary, 4th Baronet
  - Sir William Nevill Montgomerie Geary, 5th Baronet

== High Sheriffs ==
These High Sheriffs of Kent lived at Oxon Hoath:

- Sir William Culpeper, High Sheriff in 1427
- Sir Richard Culpeper, High Sheriff in 1453
- Nicholas Miller, High Sheriff in 1608
- Sir Humphry Miller, High Sheriff in 1666
- Leonard Bartholomew, High Sheriff in 1713

== Sources ==
- Hasted, Edward (1798). The History and Topographical Survey of the County of Kent. Vol. V. Canterbury: W Bristow. p59, p63, p64, p65,
