= Thomas Edwards-Freeman =

British politician

Thomas Edwards-Freeman (c. 1726–1808) was a British politician who sat in the House of Commons from 1768 to 1780.

== Early life ==
Edwards Freeman was the eldest son of Walter Edwards of St. Dunstan’s, London, and his wife Mary Freeman, daughter of Richard Freeman of Batsford, Gloucestershire. In March 1742, he succeeded his uncle Richard Freeman in the Batsford estates and assumed the additional name of Freeman. He matriculated at Queen's College, Oxford, on 3 February 1744, aged 17. He married Elizabeth Reveley, daughter of Henry Reveley of Newby Wisk, Yorkshire on 23 July 1753.

== Political career ==
At the 1768 general election, Edwards Freeman was returned unopposed as Member of Parliament for Steyning on the interest of Sir John Honywood, 3rd Baronet to whom he was distantly related. He seems to have acted completely independently in Parliament. In 1769 he became Director of the South Sea Company. He was reelected MP for Lewes unopposed in 1774 but did not stand again in 1780.

== Later life ==
Edwards Freeman died on 15 February 1808, aged 81. His son Thomas was also MP for Steyning.

Parliament of Great Britain
Preceded by Richard Fuller; Sir John Filmer	Member of Parliament for Steyning; 1768–1780; With: Sir John Filmer; Filmer Honywood	Succeeded by Sir Thomas Skipwith; Filmer Honywood
