= Filmer Honywood =

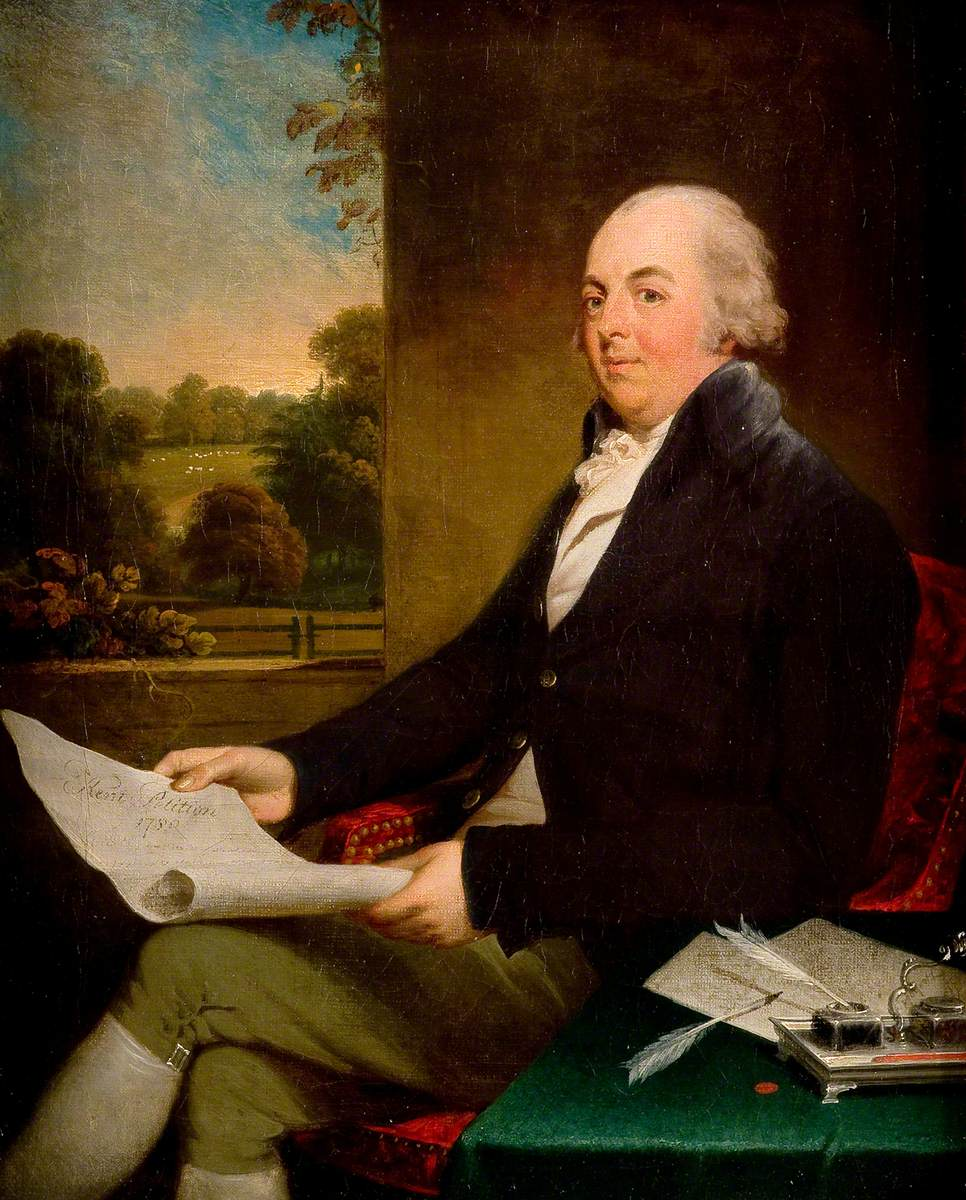

Filmer Honywood (c. 1745 – 2 June 1809) was an English politician who sat in the House of Commons at various times between 1774 and 1806.

Honywood was the son of Sir John Honywood, 3rd Baronet and his second wife Dorothy Filmer, daughter of Sir Edward Filmer, 3rd Baronet.

Honywood was elected Member of Parliament (MP) for Steyning in 1774 and held the seat until 1780. He was elected MP for Kent in 1780 and held the seat until 1796. He was re-elected MP for Kent in 1802 and held the seat until 1806.

Honywood lived at Hull Place in Ottenden and in 1785 inherited Marks Hall, Essex from General Philip Honywood. He died unmarried, and the estate passed to his half-nephew William Honywood.

Parliament of Great Britain
Preceded by Thomas Edwards-Freeman; Sir John Filmer, Bt	Member of Parliament for Steyning; 1774–1780; With: Thomas Edwards-Freeman 1774 – September 1780; Sir Thomas Skipwith, Bt September–November 1780	Succeeded by Sir Thomas Skipwith, Bt; John Bullock
Preceded by Hon. Charles Marsham; Thomas Knight, junior	Member of Parliament for Kent; 1780–1796; With: Hon. Charles Marsham 1780–1790; Sir Edward Knatchbull, Bt 1790–1796	Succeeded by Sir Edward Knatchbull, Bt; Sir William Geary, Bt
Parliament of the United Kingdom
Preceded by Sir Edward Knatchbull, Bt; Sir William Geary, Bt	Member of Parliament for Kent; 1802–1806; With: Sir William Geary, Bt	Succeeded by Sir Edward Knatchbull, Bt; William Honywood
