= HMS Chester (1743) =

Ship of the line of the Royal Navy

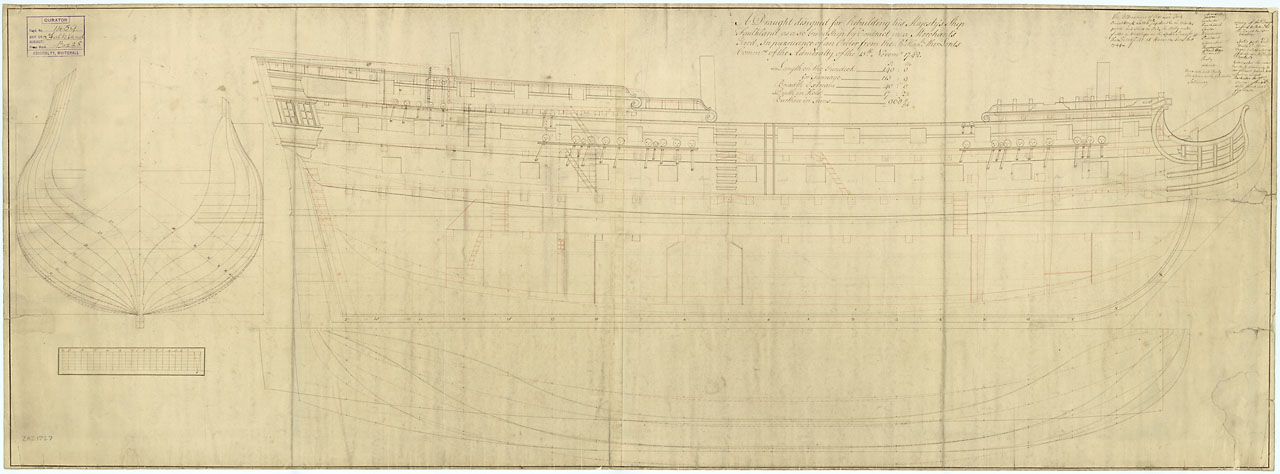
- Chester

History

Great Britain
- Name: HMS Chester
- Ordered: 24 January 1743
- Builder: Bronsdon, Wells & Stanton, Deptford
- Laid down: February 1743
- Launched: 18 February 1744
- Commissioned: February 1744
- Fate: Sold, 28 July 1767

General characteristics
- Class & type: 1741 revised dimensions 50-gun fourth rate ship of the line
- Length: 140 ft (42.7 m) (gundeck)
- Beam: 40 ft (12.2 m)
- Depth of hold: 17 ft 2 1/2 in (5.2 m)
- Propulsion: Sails
- Sail plan: Full-rigged ship
- Armament: 50 guns: Gundeck: 22 × 24 pdrs; Upper gundeck: 22 × 12 pdrs; Quarterdeck: 4 × 6 pdrs; Forecastle: 2 × 6 pdrs

HMS Chester was a 50-gun fourth rate ship of the line of the Royal Navy, one of fourteen such 50-gun ships built to a common design prepared by the Surveyor of the Navy to the dimensions laid down in the 1741 amendments to the 1719 Establishment and constructed by contract with Messrs Bronsden, Wells & Stanton at their private yard at Deptford, and launched on 18 February 1744.

== Guns ==
It was first intended that the 50-gun ships built to 1741 Establishment would carry the same ordnance as their predecessors, i.e. 18-pounder guns on the lower deck and 9-pounder guns on the upper deck. However while they were under construction the 1743 Establishment of Guns was introduced, and in accordance with this, the group all carried 24-pounders on the lower deck and 12-pounders on the upper deck, with 6-pounders on the quarterdeck and forecastle.

== Career and Fate ==
The Chester was paid off in 1748 and fitted at Plymouth as a floating battery for Milford Haven in 1757, but refitted for Channel service in 1762; she was surveyed on 13 May 1767 and sold at Woolwich on 28 July 1767.
