= West Peckham =

Village in Kent, England

Coordinates: 51.252430°N 0.335910°E

- Location within Kent
- Population: 350 (2011 Census)
- District: Tonbridge and Malling
- Shire county: Kent
- Region: South East
- Country: England
- Sovereign state: United Kingdom
- Post town: Maidstone
- Postcode district: ME18
- Police: Kent
- Fire: Kent
- Ambulance: South East Coast
- UK Parliament: Tonbridge
- Website: West Peckham Parish Council

West Peckham is a village and civil parish in the borough of Tonbridge and Malling in Kent, England. The River Bourne flows through the extreme west of the parish, and formerly powered a paper mill (Hamptons Mill) and corn mill (Oxenhoath Mill). The Wateringbury Stream rises in the parish. Oxon Hoath is the former manor house of West Peckham.

== History ==
At the time of the Domesday survey in 1096, about 29 households were in West Peckham, in the ancient hundred of Littlefield, Lathe of Aylesford, West Kent.

The Domesday entry for East and West Peckham reads:-

The Archbishop himself holds Pecheham, In the time of King Edward the Confessor it was taxed at six sulungs, and now six sulungs and one yoke. The arable land is ten carucates. In demesne there are two, and sixteen villeins, with fourteen borderers, having four carucates and a half. There is a church, and ten servants, and one mill, and six acres of meadow. Wood for the pannage of six hogs.
Of the land of this manor, one of the archbishop's tenants holds half a sulung, and was taxed with these six sulungs in the time of King Edward the Confessor, although it could not belong to the manor, except in the scotting, because it was free land.
Richard de Tonebridge holds of the same favour two sulungs and one yoke, and has there twenty-seven villeins, having seven carucates, and wood for the pannage of ten hogs. The whole value being four pounds. In the time of King Edward the Confessor, the manor was worth twelve pounds, when the Archbishop received it eight pounds, and now what he has is worth eight pounds.

== Amenities ==
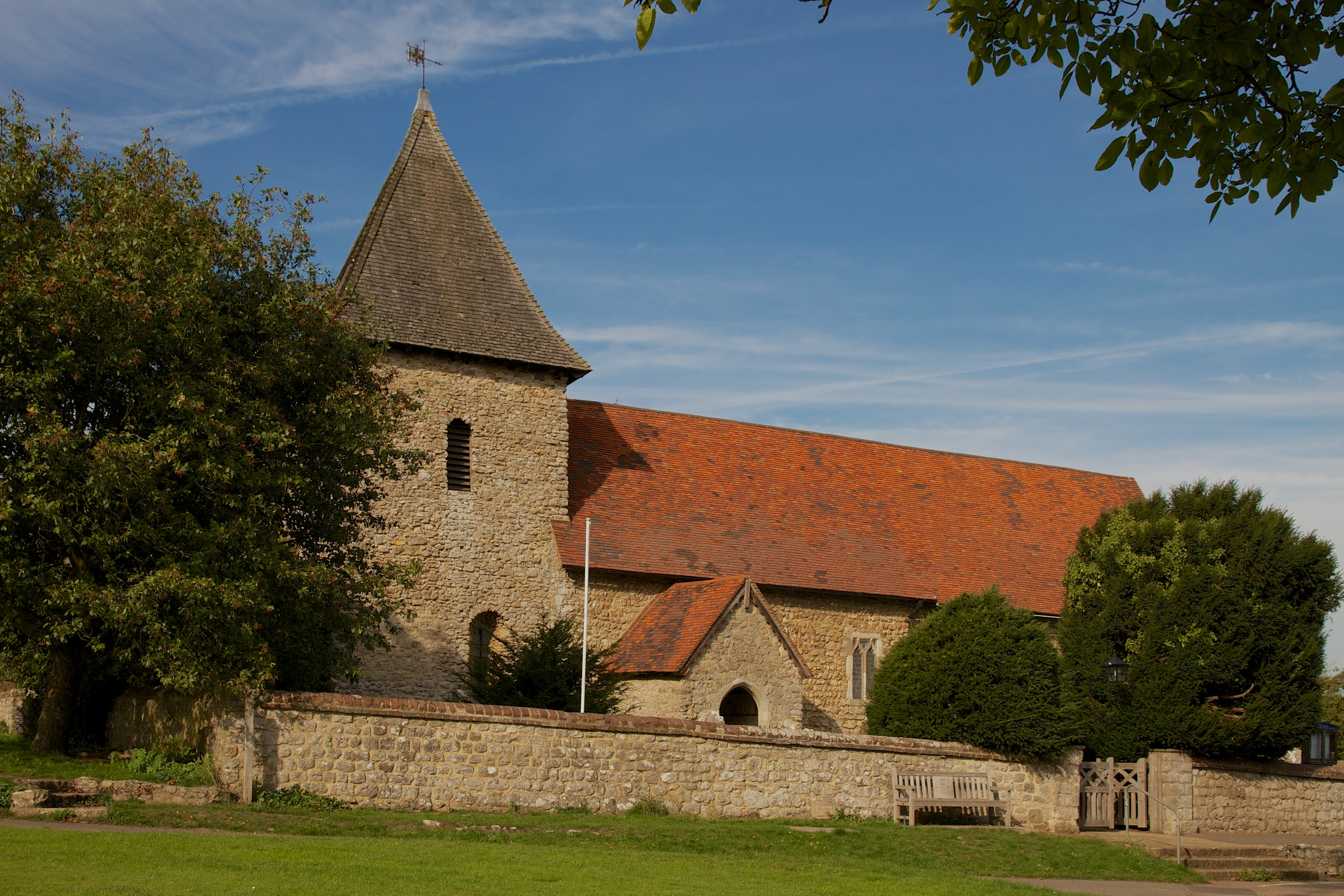
The Saxon church of St Dunstan is a Grade I listed building

The Saxon church of St. Dunstan's is open most days to visitors and the church is still actively used.

Dukes Place on Mereworth Road is a Grade I listed timbered hall house, originally built as Preceptory of the Knight's Hospitallers in 1408 by John Culpepper.

== Notable people ==
- John Culpeper (1366–1414) built Oxon Hoath and established West Peckham Preceptory c1408.
- Joyce Culpeper (c 1480–1531) was born at Oxon Hoath.
- Richard Watts (1529–1579), merchant and MP for Rochester, was probably born in West Peckham.

== See also ==
- Listed buildings in West Peckham
