= Honeywood Winery =

Winery in Salem, Oregon, U.S.

- Location: Salem, Oregon, U.S.
- Coordinates: 44.9264°N 123.0284°W
- Founded: 1934
- Website: www.honeywoodwinery.com

Honeywood Winery is a winery in Salem, Oregon, United States, located within the Willamette Valley AVA. Founded in 1934, it is the oldest continually producing winery in Oregon.

== History ==
The winery was founded as Columbia Distilleries by Ron Honeyman and John Wood. It was issued a bonded winery license on December 6, 1933—the first day it was legal to do so after the repeal of Prohibition in the United States—making it the oldest continually producing winery in Oregon. After scouting several locations across Oregon, Wood selected Salem as the location for the distillery due to the availability of local fruits. Columbia Distilleries, Inc. was incorporated in December 1934.

The company was granted a license to operate a distillery in Salem by the Oregon Liquor Control Commission in July 1937, by which point it had been renamed Honeywood Distilleries, Inc. Wood related in a 1938 newspaper interview that the name was a reference to the "House of Honeywood", an inn from Oliver Goldsmith's play The Good-Natur'd Man.

According to writer Scott Stursa: "John Wood died in 1955. Management of the company apparently suffered, and this, along with declining demand for sweet and fruit wines, led to imminent bankruptcy in 1962." Mary Reinke, who started as a secretary at the company in 1943, took over as president in 1963.

In 1973, Honeywood Winery was acquired by Northwest Distillers, a company formed by three Minneapolis investors—Paul Gallick, Charles Newman, and William F. Miller. Gallick later became the sole proprietor of the winery.

As of 2025, the winery remains under the management of the Gallick family.
