= Philip Honywood (British Army officer, died 1785) =

British army officer and politician

General Philip Honywood
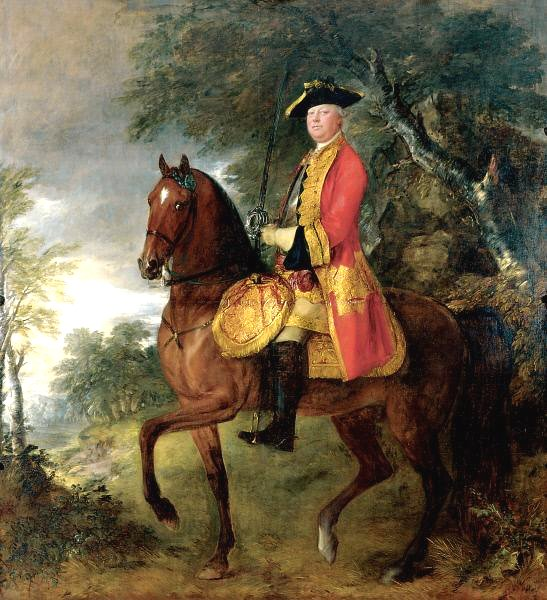
- Portrait by Thomas Gainsborough, 1765

Member of Parliament for Appleby
- In office 1754–1784

Personal details
- Born: c. 1710
- Died: 21 February 1785

Military service
- Allegiance: Great Britain
- Branch/service: British Army
- Years of service: 1735–1785
- Rank: General
- Battles/wars: Jacobite rising of 1745; Clifton Moor Skirmish (WIA); War of the Austrian Succession; Battle of Dettingen (WIA)

General Philip Honywood (c. 1710 – 21 February 1785) was a British army officer who sat in the House of Commons from 1754 to 1784.

Honywood was the fifth son of Robert Honywood and his wife Mary Sandford, daughter of Sir Richard Sandford, Bart. and sister and heiress of Sir Richard Sandford, 3rd Baronet of Howgill Castle. He succeeded his brother to the Marks Hall estate in Essex in 1755.

== Military career ==
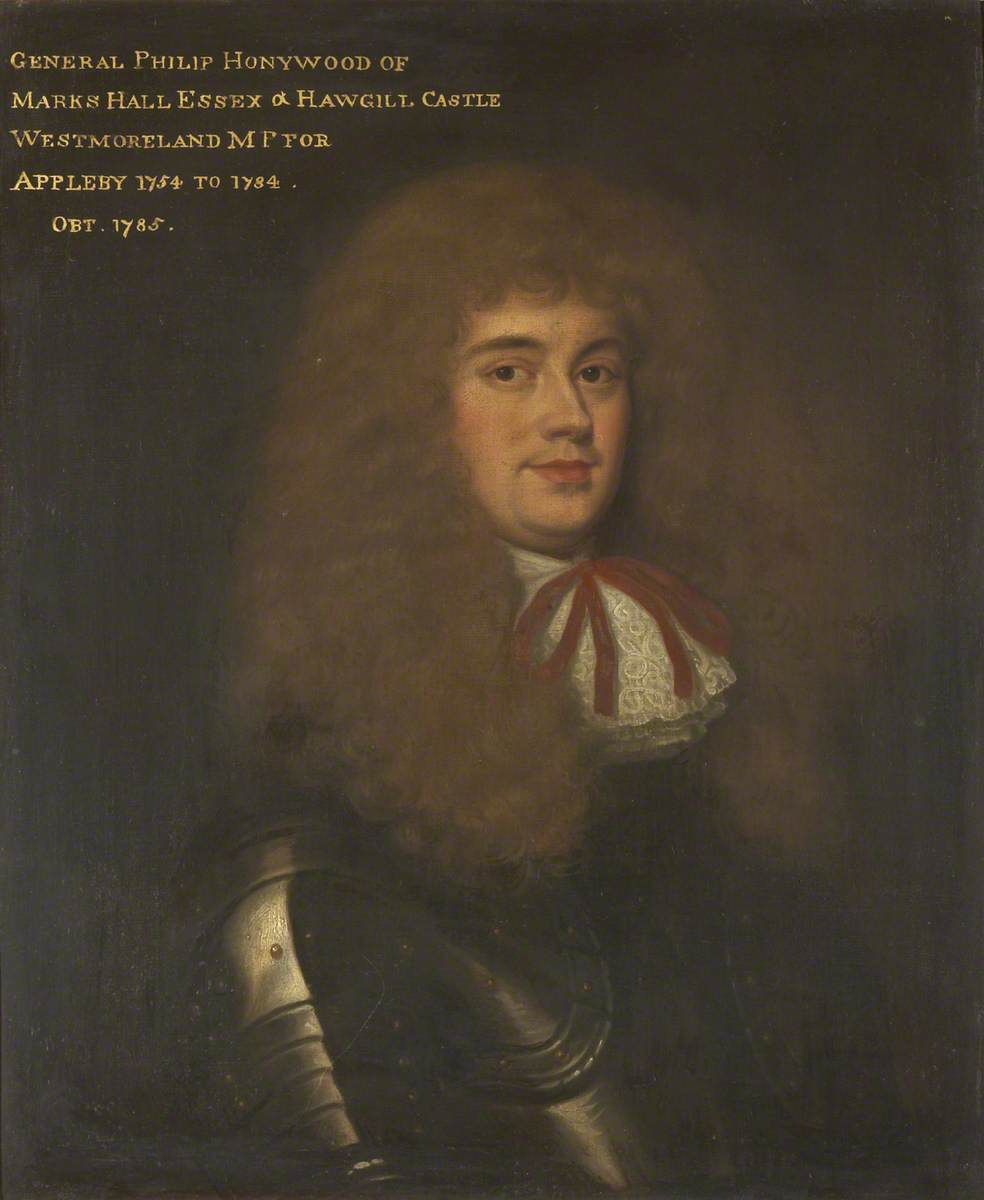
A portrait, possibly portraying Honywood, by Michael Dahl

He joined the Army as a cornet and rose through the ranks to become a major in 1741. At the Battle of Dettingen in 1743, he received at least twenty-three broadsword wounds and two musket shots which were never removed, distinguishing himself by his personal valour. He was afterwards promoted to a lieutenant-colonelcy in the regiment of his uncle, also Philip Honywood. He took part in the Jacobite Rising of 1745 and was seriously wounded at the skirmish at Clifton in 1745. He was promoted colonel in 1752 and awarded the colonelcy of the 20th Foot in 1755–56 and the 9th Dragoons from 1756 to 1759. He was made major-general in 1758, given the colonelcy of the 4th Horse from 1759 to 1782 and made lieutenant-general in 1760.

He was Governor of Kingston-upon-Hull from 1766 to his death. He was finally promoted to full General in 1777 and transferred to be Colonel of the 3rd Dragoon Guards from 1782 to his death.

== Parliamentary career ==
Honywood was elected Member of Parliament for Appleby in 1754 and held the seat until 1784.

Honywood died in 1785 aged 75. He had married Elizabeth Wastell, but their only child, Philip, who was born 27 June 1760, died aged 19. He left his Marks Hall estate worth nearly £6000 per annum to his cousin Filmer Honywood, M.P. for Kent.

Parliament of Great Britain
Preceded by Randle Wilbraham; Sir John Ramsden, Bt	Member of Parliament for Appleby; 1754–1784; With: William Lee 1754–1756; Fletcher Norton 1756–1761; John Stanwix 1761–1767; Charles Jenkinson 1767–1773; Fletcher Norton 1773–1774; George Johnstone 1774–1780; William Lowther 1780–1781; William Pitt 1781–1784	Succeeded by Richard Penn; John Leveson-Gower
Military offices
Preceded by The Earl of Albemarle	Colonel of the 20th Regiment of Foot; 1755–1756	Succeeded by William Kingsley
Preceded by John Jordan	Colonel of the 9th Regiment of Dragoons; 1755–1756	Succeeded by Henry Whitley
Preceded by Hon. Henry Seymour Conway	Colonel of the 4th Regiment of Horse; 1759–1782	Succeeded by Studholme Hodgson
Preceded by Harry Pulteney	Governor of Kingston-upon-Hull; 1766–1785	Succeeded by James Murray
Preceded by Lord Robert Manners	Colonel of 3rd (The Prince of Wales's) Dragoon Guards; 1782–1785	Succeeded by Richard Burton Phillipson
