= John Culpeper =

English landowner

Sir John Culpeper (c. 1366 - 1414) was an English landowner whose holding was at Oxenhoath (Oxon Hoath) in the Kent parish of West Peckham.

The Colepepers or Culpepers, during the reign of Edward III, separated into two branches. One branch settled at Bay Hall, near Pepenbury, Kent, from which descended Baron Colepeper, master of the Rolls in the time of Charles I. The other settled in Preston Hall, near Aylesford, Kent.

Born about 1366, the son of William Culpeper, he married Catherine Charles, daughter of Richard Charles. His son and heir was Sir William Culpeper, who married Elizabeth Ferrers and died on 20 July 1457, both being buried in West Peckham church.
