= HMS Zealand =

There have been three ships that have served in the Royal Navy named HMS Zealand. Each has been a vessel captured from the Royal Netherlands Navy.

- HMS Zealand (1665), a fourth-rate ship of the line originally named Wapen Van Zealand with 42 guns, captured from the Dutch in 1665 and sold in 1667.
- HMS Zealand (1667), a 8-gun flyboat captured from the Dutch in 1667 and sold in 1668.
- HMS Zealand (1796), a third-rate ship of the line seized from the Dutch in 1796 and transferred to Plymouth for harbour service. The vessel was renamed HMS Justitia in 1812 and broken up in 1830.

== See also ==
- HMS Zealandia
- HMS New Zealand
