= William Honywood (died 1818) =

William Honywood (c. 1759 – 9 February 1818) was a British soldier and Whig politician who sat in the House of Commons from 1806 to 1812.

Honeywood was the son of William Honywood and his wife Elizabeth Clark of Wallingford. He served in the American War.

Honywood was elected as a Member of Parliament (MP) for Kent at the 1806 general election and held the seat until the 1812 general election, which he did not contest.

In 1809, Honywood inherited the Marks Hall estate from his half-uncle Filmer Honywood, who was also a Member of Parliament.

Honywood married Mary Brockman. He died at his home in Charles Street, Berkeley Square, London, at the age of 59. Their son, William Philip, was also MP for Kent, and inherited the Marks Hall estate.

Parliament of the United Kingdom
Preceded by Filmer Honywood; Sir William Geary, Bt	Member of Parliament for Kent; 1806–1812; With: Sir Edward Knatchbull, 8th Bt	Succeeded by Sir Edward Knatchbull, 8th Bt; Sir William Geary, Bt
