= William Philip Honywood =

Member of Parliament for Kent

Personal details
- Born: William Philip Honywood; 15 April 1790
- Died: 22 April 1831 (aged 41)
- Party: Whig
- Spouse: Priscilla Hanbury
- Parents: William Honywood (father); Mary Brockman (mother)
- Education: Rugby College (1800); Jesus College, Cambridge (1808)

William Philip Honywood (15 April 1790 – 22 April 1831) was an English Whig politician who sat in the House of Commons from 1818 to 1830.

== Early life and education ==
Honywood was the eldest son of William Honywood and his wife Mary Brockman. He graduated from Rugby in 1800 and Jesus College, Cambridge in 1808.

== Military career ==
He was a Captain in the Ashford regiment of the Kent militia in 1809.

== Politics ==
Honywood was a staunch Whig and was elected Member of Parliament (MP) for Kent at the 1818 general election. He held the seat until the 1830 general election when he retired on the grounds of ill-health.

== Personal life and death ==
He married Priscilla Hanbury, the daughter of Charles Hanbury of Sloe Farm, Halstead on 11 September 1820. They had three sons: William Philip, Robert, and Walter; and one daughter. The Honywoods lived at Marks Hall, Essex. Honywood died aged 41 on 22 April 1831.

Parliament of the United Kingdom
| Preceded by Sir Edward Knatchbull, 8th Bt; Sir William Geary, Bt | Member of Parliament for Kent; 1818 – 1830; With: Sir Edward Knatchbull, 8th Bt 1818–1819; Sir Edward Knatchbull, 9th Bt 1819–1830 | Succeeded by Thomas Law Hodges; Sir Edward Knatchbull, 9th Bt |
