= Honywood baronets =

Title in the Baronetage of England

The Honywood Baronetcy, of Evington in the County of Kent, is a title in the Baronetage of England. It was created on 19 July 1660 for Edward Honywood. He was the son of Sir John Honywood, high sheriff of Kent from 1607 to 1609. The second Baronet represented Canterbury in the House of Commons. The fourth Baronet sat as Member of Parliament for Steyning, Canterbury and Honiton. The eighth Baronet was an Alderman of the Kent County Council. The tenth Baronet was a Colonel in the British Army.

== Honywood baronets, of Evington (1660) ==
- Sir Edward Honywood, 1st Baronet (c. 1628–1670)
- Sir William Honywood, 2nd Baronet (c. 1654–1748)
- Sir John Honywood, 3rd Baronet (c. 1710–1781)
- Sir John Honywood, 4th Baronet (c. 1757–1806)
- Sir John Courtenay Honywood, 5th Baronet (1787–1832)
- Sir John Edward Honywood, 6th Baronet (1812–1845)
- Sir Courtenay Honywood, 7th Baronet (1835–1878)
- Sir John William Honywood, 8th Baronet (1857–1907)
- Sir Courtenay John Honywood, 9th Baronet (1880–1944)
- Sir William Wynne Honywood, 10th Baronet (1891–1982)
- Sir Filmer Courtenay William Honywood, 11th Baronet (1930–2025)
- Sir Rupert Anthony Honywood, 12th Baronet (born 1957)

The heir apparent to the baronetcy is Samuel Thomas Courtenay Honywood (born 1996), son of the 12th Baronet.
