= Pushpagiri =

Pushpagiri may refer to:

- Pushpagiri Vihara, an ancient Buddhist monastery in Odisha, India
- Pushpagiri Wildlife Sanctuary, a wildlife sanctuary in Karnataka, India
  - Pushpagiri, a peak in the Pushpagiri Wildlife Sanctuary
- Pushpagiri, Andhra Pradesh, a village in India
  - Pushpagiri Temple Complex, located by the village of Pushpagiri

== See also ==
- Pushpa (disambiguation)
- Giri (disambiguation)
