= Jagadguru Adi Shankara =

2013 film directed by J. K. Bharavi

- Film poster
- Directed by: J. K. Bharavi
- Written by: J. K. Bharavi
- Produced by: Nara Jaya Sri Devi
- Starring: Kaushik Babu; Nagarjuna Akkineni; Mohan Babu; Suman; Srihari; Sai Kumar
- Cinematography: S. Gopal Reddy; P. K. H. Das
- Edited by: Gautham Raju
- Music by: Nag Sri Vatsa
- Production company: Global Peace Creators
- Release date: 15 August 2013
- Running time: 130 minutes
- Country: India
- Language: Telugu

Jagadguru Adi Shankara is a 2013 Indian Telugu-language biographical film written and directed by J. K. Bharavi that depicts the life of 9th-century philosopher Adi Shankara .The ensemble cast includes Kaushik Babu in the title role of Adi Shankaracharya, Nagarjuna, Mohan Babu, Suman, Srihari and Sai Kumar. Some of Chiranjeevi's scenes from Sri Manjunatha (2001) were reused in the film.

== Plot ==
Adi Shankara is born at Kalady in Kerala to Shivaguru and Aryamba from a Kerala Brahmin family. Soon after Adi Shankara is born, Agni the fire-god, says to Rudraksha Rushi that he has only 8 years to live. So, Rudraksha Rushi gives 24 years of life to Shankara from his span, at a cycle of every 8 years, whenever Shankara's life is in trouble. After his father's death, his mother's health declines, and Shankara shows his remarkable power in acquiring mastery over the four Vedas at the age of eight and being able to chant the Om sound for a long duration in one breath.

Shankara, while seeking alms, meets a poor woman who gives him only a dry gooseberry fruit. Shankara, seeing the woman's despair, spontaneously composes the Kanakadhara Stotram. Instantly, Goddess Lakshmi showers him with golden gooseberry fruits. Shankara and his friends divert the Poorna River to flow by his mother's house for her daily bath. One day, he is caught by a crocodile in the river, and he seeks the permission of his mother to become a Sanyasi (renunciate); and then only the crocodile leaves him. Reluctantly, his mother accepts his proposal and then the crocodile disappears.

At only 10 years old, Shankara leaves for North India in search of a guru. Then in Omkareshwar, he finds his guru, Govinda Bhagavatpada. When Bhagavatpada asks him who he is, he replies with the Nirvana Shatakam, which impresses Bhagavatpada. Bhagavatpada teaches Shankara the Advaita philosophy, magical control over the five elements and Parakaya Pravesha (A soul leaving one's own body and entering another body), etc. Soon, Shankara decides to preach his Advaita Vedanta philosophy to the people who are quarrelling among themselves in the name of caste and religion. Shankara teaches a lesson to one such person, Kapalikudu, who is responsible for the quarrels among the people. In another sequence, a Chandala proves to Shankara that all the people are equal before God, irrespective of race, caste, gender and profession.

During his philosophical tour which spans the cities of Srisailam, Sringeri, Srirangam, Pithapuram, Nashik, Khajuraho, Ujjain, Kathmandu, Simhachalam, Aravalli, Kanchipuram, Varanasi, Madurai, Pushpagiri, Kurukshetra, Khandwa, Dwaraka, Kumbakonam, Draksharamam, Ajanta, Somnath, Kolar, Konark, Murudeshwara, Kanyakumari, Badrinath, Nanjangud, Guruvayur, Dandakaranya, Alampuram, Shravanabelagola, Sarnath, Chidambaram, Puri, Tirumala, Haridwar, Taxila, Prayagraj, Ayodhya, Patna, Parli, Srikalahasti and Bhimashankara. Along the way, he recruits three direct disciples; Padmapadacharya, who was named so because he crossed the Ganga river on a lotus flower bridge when Shankara called him, Totakacharya, who spontaneously composed the Totakashtakam and Hastamalaka, who was already a child genius on Advaita philosophy when he met Shankara. While in Varanasi, Shankara meets Goddess Ganga, who gives him a few scriptures to study.

Shankara gets a chance to debate with Maṇḍana Miśra. While Miśra is about to give up, his wife Ubhaya Bharati challenges Shankara by asking some questions on love, sex and related subjects. As Shankara is a Sanyasi, he cannot answer her questions. He then asks for a recess of 15 days. He later does Parakaya Pravesha and enters the dead body of King Amaraka Maharaju. He then makes love with his wife and learns and gets the answers to the questions posed by Ubhaya Bharati, who declares him to be undefeatable, and Mandana Misra joins Shankara as his fourth direct disciple, assuming the name Sureśvara. He assigns them as the custodians of four cardinal monasteries. Padmapada for Puri (East), Totakacharya for Joshimath (North), Hastamalaka for Dwaraka (West) and Suresvara for Sringeri (South).

Shankara then finds out through his intuition that his mother wishes to see him again. He returns to Kalady and meets his mother, who finally dies after chanting the name of Lord Vishnu. However, Shankara, being a sanyasi, isn't allowed to perform the funerary rites of his mother. He eventually decides to perform the funerary rites after Lord Shiva helps him by lighting the crematory fire using his third eye. This act makes the Brahmins of Kalady excommunicate Shankara, who, in turn, utters a curse on the whole town that the residents will cremate their kith and kin in the backyard of their own houses rather than the cremation ground. However, they repent for their actions later. Finally, having attained the 'Sarvagnapeetha' of Kashmir, the 32-year-old Adi Shankara hands over the succession to his disciples and walks to Kedarnath. He walks behind the mountains and meets Lord Shiva, who grants him salvation and entry to heaven. To this day, Adi Shankara is revered as an incarnation (avatar) of Lord Shiva himself.

== Cast ==
- Kaushik Babu as Adi Shankara
- Nagarjuna as Chandala
- Srihari as Govinda Bhagavatpada
- Mohan Babu as Rudraksha Rushi
- P. Sai Kumar as Mandana Misra
- Meena as Goddess Ganga
- Roja as Goddess Lakshmi
- Tulasi
- Tanikella Bharani
- Kamalinee Mukherjee as Ubhaya Bharati
- Anand as Siva Guru, Sankara's father
- Rohini as Aryambha, Sankara's mother
- Suman
- Nagendra Babu
- Sreerama Chandra as Amaraka Maharaju
- Suthi Velu as the dead body
- L. B. Sriram as a saint
- Kamna Jethmalani as the Queen, Amaraka's wife
- Posani Krishna Murali as Maha Mantri
- Vijayachander as Raja Jothishudu
- Geetha Singh as a citizen of Amaraka's Kingdom.
- Sana as Goddess Saraswati
- Chiranjeevi as Shiva/narrator (cameo appearance)

== Soundtrack ==
Jagadguru Adi Shankara

Film score by Nag Sri Vatsa
- Released: 11 March 2013
- Recorded: 2013
- Genre: Soundtrack
- Length: 45:31
- Label: Aditya Music
- Producer: Nag Sri Vatsa

Music was composed by Nag Sri Vatsa. Music was released on ADITYA Music Company. The soundtrack of fourteen tracks was released by Paripoornananda Saraswati, on 11 March 2013. Some of the songs were composed by Adi Shankara and Vyasa.

No.	Title	Lyrics	Singer(s)	Length
1.	"Omkaram"	Vyasa	Shankar Mahadevan	3:23
2.	"Akhila Charachara"	Vyasa	Unni Krishnan	3:52
3.	"Om Namah Shivaya"	Vyasa	Karthik	3:39
4.	"Bhaja Govindam"	Adi Shankara	Madhu Balakrishnan	3:52
5.	"Bhrama Ani Telusu"	J. K. Bharavi	Sreerama Chandra	4:36
6.	"Sri Krishnaha"	Vyasa	S. P. Balasubrahmanyam, Mani Nagaraj	2:59
7.	"Yavadu Neevu"	J. K. Bharavi	S. P. Balasubrahmanyam	3:17
8.	"Lakshmi Padmalaya (lyrics taken from Kanakadhara Stotram)"	Adi Shankara	Sharath Santosh	1:31
9.	"Soundarya Lahari"	Adi Shankara	Ranjith	2:38
10.	"Lakshmi Nrusimha (lyrics taken from Lakshmi Narasimha Karavalamba Stotram)"	Adi Shankara	Tippu	2:15
11.	"Veda Thandavam"	Vedas	Chorus	1:29
12.	"Annapurna Ashtakam"	Adi Shankara	S. P. Balasubrahmanyam	4:36
13.	"Shankara Vijayam"	Vyasa	Chorus	1:42
14.	"Shivoham (lyrics taken from Nirvana Shatakam)"	Adi Shankara	Hariharan	3:15
15.	"Chiranjeevi About Adi Shankaracharya"	J. K. Bharavi	Chiranjeevi	2:13
Total length:				45:31

== Home media ==
Producers planned in low expensive. Blu-ray studio took copy from producers. Later on 30 September 2013 HD DVD came in force. Later broadcast right acquired by Gemini TV.

== Reception ==
Karthik Pasupulate of The Times of India, rated the film 1.5/5 and wrote: "The movie isn't great enough to be even funny." Pasupalate criticized the lead actor by stating, "Kaushik is an absolute disaster who when not looking dazed, looks intensely agitated." 123Telugu.com which rated the film 3/5, opined, "‘Jagadguru Adishankara’ is a film that will appeal to elderly people and folks who are devotionally inclined." The reviewer, however, criticized the technical departments of the film such as VFX, cinematography and editing.
