= Brahmagiri =

Brahmagiri may refer to:

- Brahmagiri (Maharashtra), a hill in the Western Ghats range in Maharashtra, India; source of the River Godavari
- Brahmagiri (Karnataka), a mountain range in the Western Ghats range in Karnataka, India
- Brahmagiri archaeological site, in Karnataka
- Brahmagiri Wildlife Sanctuary, in Karnataka
- Brahmagiri, Odisha, India, a town
- Brahmagiri Assembly constituency, a constituency of the Odisha Legislative Assembly

== See also ==
- Brahma (disambiguation)
- Giri (disambiguation)
