= Geary =

Geary, an Anglicized rendering of the Irish name O'Gadhra, has a number of meanings:

== Places ==
=== United States ===
- Geary, Kansas, a ghost town in Doniphan County
- Geary County, Kansas, a county
- Geary, Oklahoma, a city

=== Other countries ===
- Geary, New Brunswick, Canada, a rural community
- Geary, Isle of Skye, Scotland, a township
- Geary River, a river in Victoria, Australia

== People ==
- Geary (surname)
- Geary (given name)

== Other uses ==
- Geary Act, an 1892 U.S. government law that restricted the rights of Chinese immigrants in the United States
- Geary Boulevard, a major thoroughfare in San Francisco, California
- Geary baronets, a baronetcy in the Baronetage of Great Britain
- Geary (email client), an email application for the GNOME 3 desktop
- D. L. Geary Brewing Company, a microbrewery located in Portland, Maine
- Battery Geary, part of the defenses of Corregidor during World War II

== See also ==
- Ambush of Geary, a 1776 American Revolutionary War skirmish
- Giri (disambiguation)
