= Maya (1999 film) =

- Poster in Tamil
- Directed by: Rama Narayanan
- Written by: Rama Narayanan
- Dialogues by: Pugazhmani (Tamil); K. Seetharam (Kannada)
- Produced by: N. Radha
- Starring: Napolean; Nagma
- Cinematography: W. R. Chandran
- Edited by: Rajkeerthi
- Music by: RRG
- Production company: Sri Thenandal Films
- Release date: 15 January 1999
- Running time: 146 minutes
- Country: India
- Languages: Tamil; Kannada

Maya is a 1999 Indian Tamil-language devotional film, produced and directed by Rama Narayanan. The film stars Napoleon and Nagma, while S. P. Balasubrahmanyam plays a supporting role. The venture was simultaneously shot in Kannada as Jayasoorya. The Tamil version was dubbed in Telugu as Gurupoornima and in Hindi as Sai Teri Maya. The films, which had music composed by R. R. G, were released on 15 January 1999.

== Cast ==
Actor (Tamil)	Actor (Kannada)	Role (Tamil)	Role (Kannada)
Napolean		Pratap	Pratap
Nagma		Lakshmi	Lakshmi
S. P. Balasubrahmanyam		Bomma Rangan	Bomma Rangan
Vadivelu	Tennis Krishna		
Rami Reddy		Bangara Raju	Bangar Rao
Vadivukkarasi		Anitha	Anitha
Anuja			
T. P. Gajendran	Bank Janardhan		
Sheela		Jayasurya	Jayasurya

== Production ==
Some scenes were shot at Kotilingeshwara Temple at Kolar district, Karnataka.

== Soundtrack ==
The soundtrack was composed by RRG.

Tamil

- Baba Oru Karunalayam - S. P. Balasubrahmanyam (Lyrics Piraisoodan)
- Thataka Pithaka - Sabesh

Kannada

The lyrics were written by Geethapriya.

== Release and reception ==
The Tamil and Kannada versions were released in 1999, with the Telugu version released shortly thereafter. D. S. Ramanujam of The Hindu wrote, "Rama Narayanan has chosen an ideal story to utilise the modern wizardy on the screen. Followers of Shirdi Sai Baba will flock the cinemas, because of the miracles this messenger of God performs, in the film, to save his devotees from the evil force" He also appreciated the visual effects and cinematography.
