= William Geary =

William Geary may refer to:

- Sir William Geary, 2nd Baronet (1756–1825), MP for Kent 1796–1806 and 1812–1818
- Sir William Geary, 3rd Baronet (1825–1877), MP for West Kent 1835–1837
- Sir William Nevill Montgomerie Geary, 5th Baronet (1895–1944), see Geary baronets

== See also ==
- Geary (disambiguation)
