= McGeary =

McGeary is a surname. Notable people with the surname include:

- Clarence McGeary (1926–1993), American footballer
- Liam McGeary (born 1982), English martial artist
- Mike McGeary (1851–1933), American baseball player

== See also ==
- Geary (surname)
