= Nishabdha =

- Directed by: Dinesh Babu
- Written by: Dinesh Babu
- Produced by: Jayashree Devi
- Starring: Vishnuvardhan; Sumanth; Mohini; Revathi
- Cinematography: Dinesh Babu
- Edited by: B. S. Kemparaj
- Music by: Stephen-Dharma
- Production company: Chinni films
- Release date: 10 March 1998
- Running time: 125 min
- Country: India
- Language: Kannada

Nishabdha (transl. Silence) is a 1998 Indian Kannada thriller film directed and written by Dinesh Babu and stars Vishnuvardhan, Sumanth, Mohini and Revathy in the lead roles. The film was produced by Jayashri Devi for the "Chinni Films" banner and the music is composed by Stephen-Dharma. This was Revathy's second and final Kannada film to date.

== Cast ==
- Vishnuvardhan as Major Vishwanath
- Revathi as Dr. Vineetha
- Ramakrishna as Vasu
- Mohini as Varsha
- Sumanth as Vijay
- Sunil Puranik as Vinod Gowda
- J. K. Bharavi as Veerendra Gowda
- Kashi
- Sihi Kahi Geetha
- Nizhalgal Ravi as Vikram Gowda
- G. K. Govinda Rao as College Principal

== Legacy ==
Devraj Kumar titled his film as Nishabda 2 released in 2017 which had no relation with this film.
