= Geary (surname) =

Geary is a surname of Irish origin, being an anglicised form of Ó Gadhra or Mac Gadhra. Another version of the name, commonly found in England, derives from the Old French first name, Geri.

== Politics ==
- Carl Robin Geary (d. 1910), elected posthumously as mayor of Tracy City, Tennessee
- George Reginald Geary (1873–1954), mayor of Toronto, Ontario, Canada from 1910 to 1912
- John W. Geary (1819–1873), mayor of San Francisco, governor of the Kansas Territory, governor of Pennsylvania and general in the American Civil War
- Thomas J. Geary, (1854-1929), U.S. Representative from California
- Sir William Geary, 2nd Baronet (1756-1825), English politician
- Sir William Geary, 3rd Baronet (1810-1877), English politician

== Academics ==
- David C. Geary (b. 1957), American academic psychologist
- Dick Geary (1945–2021), British historian
- Patrick J. Geary (b. 1948), American medieval historian
- Roy C. Geary, (1896-1983), Irish social scientist

== Military ==
- Benjamin Handley Geary (1891–1976), British soldier in World War I and a recipient of the Victoria Cross
- Sir Francis Geary, 1st Baronet (1709-1796), Royal Navy admiral
- Francis Geary (1752–1776), British officer (and son of Admiral Francis Geary) killed in the Ambush of Geary during the American Revolutionary War
- General John W. Geary US Civil war general

== Arts and writers ==
- Anthony "Tony" Geary (1947–2025), American actor
- Bernard Geary (1934–2023), Irish composer
- Bud Geary (1898–1946), American film actor
- Caron Geary (born 1963), English reggae musician, known as "MC Kinky"
- Clifford Geary (1916–2008), American illustrator
- Cynthia Geary (born 1965), American actress
- David Geary (born 1963), New Zealand playwright
- Emma Geary (born 1977), British Pop-Surrealist artist, known as "Anarkitty"
- Jackie Geary (born 1977), American actress, writer, and producer
- James Geary (born 1962), London-based editor of Time magazine and author of The Body Electric
- Karl Geary (born 1972), Irish-American actor
- Linda Geary (born 1960), American visual artist, teacher
- Lois Geary (1928–2015), American actress
- Mark Geary (born 1971), Irish singer-songwriter and musician
- Patricia Geary, American novelist
- Paul Geary (born 1961), American rock and roll drummer and manager
- Rick Geary (born 1946), American cartoonist and illustrator
- Thomas Augustine Geary (1775–1801), Irish composer

== Sport ==
- Albert Geary (1900–1989), English cricketer
- Anna Geary, Former Irish camogie player & television presenter
- Bob Geary (1933–2001), Canadian football player and manager
- Bob Geary (1891–1980), American baseball player
- Brian Geary (b. 1980), Irish hurling player
- Derek Geary (b. 1980), Irish footballer
- Donald Geary (1926–2015), American ice hockey player
- Fred Geary (1868–1955), English footballer
- Fred Geary (1887–1980), English cricketer
- Geoff Geary (b. 1976), American Major League Baseball player
- George Geary (1893–1981) England cricketer
- Guillermo Geary (1926–unknown), Argentinian athlete
- Huck Geary (1917–1981), American baseball player
- Jarryn Geary (b. 1988), Australian rules footballer
- Karl Geary (b. 1982), English cricketer
- Reggie Geary (b. 1973), American basketball player and coach
- Richard Geary (b. 1963), Australian rules footballer
- Sharon Geary, American swimmer
- Terry Geary, Australian rugby league footballer

== Others ==
- Bob Geary (1939–2025), San Francisco police officer best known for his ventriloquist's dummy, Brendan O'Smarty
- Leslie "Ted" Geary (1885–1960), American yacht designer
- Stephen Geary (1797–1854), British architect

== Fictional characters ==
- John Geary, protagonist of the military science fiction novel series The Lost Fleet
- Pat Geary, character in the film The Godfather, Part II
- Roy Geary (Prison Break), character from the television show Prison Break

== See also ==
- Geary baronets
- Geary (given name)
- McGeary
