= J. K. Bharavi =

Indian musician, actor and director

- Born: 1 December 1970 (age 55); Warangal, Andhra Pradesh, (present-day Telangana) India
- Occupations: Writer; Director

J. K. Bharavi is an Indian film, writer, lyricist, playback singer, composer, actor, producer and director known for his works predominantly in Telugu cinema. In 2004, he scripted Bommalata which received the National Film Award for Best Feature Film in Telugu for that year.

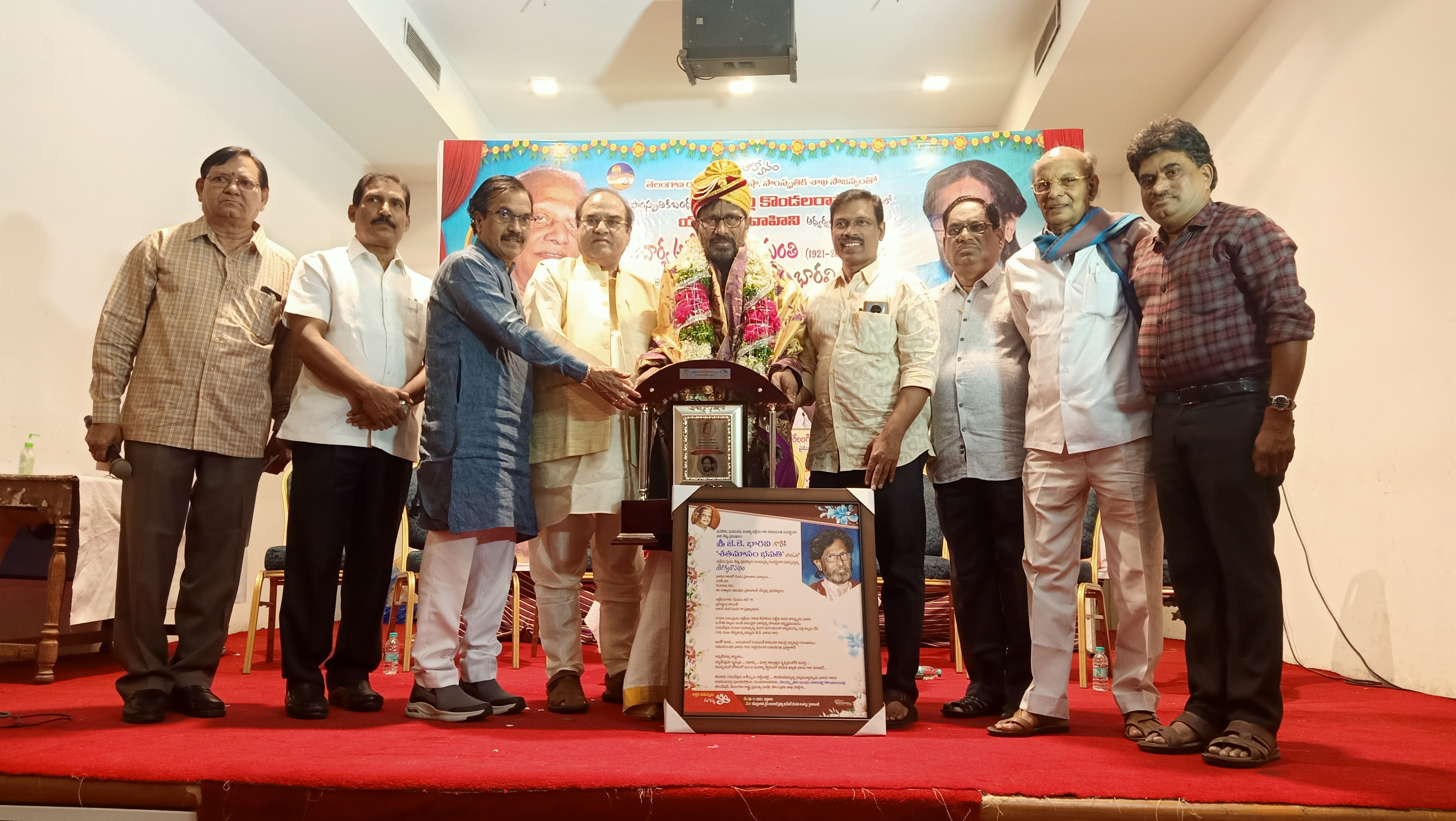
JK Bharavi receiving Aatreya-PriyaShishya Award

== Filmography ==
As director

- Chitikela Pandiri
- Rangavalli
- Jagadguru Adi Sankara

As writer.

- 1997 Annamayya
- 1998 Nishabdha
- 1998 Love Story 1999
- 1999 Habba (Kannada)
- 2001 Sri Manjunatha
- 2001 Vande Matharam (Kannada)
- 2006 Sri Ramadasu
- 2006 Bommalata
- 2008 Pandurangadu
- 2011 Shakti
- 2017 Om Namo Venkatesaya
- 2019 Muniratna Kurukshetra (Kannada)

As actor

- 1998 Nishabdha (Kannada)
- 2008 Pandurangadu
- 2006 Sri Ramadasu

As composer

- 2002 Chandravamsam

As producer

- 1995: Kona Edaithe (Kannada)
- 2002: Chandravamsam
