= Geary (given name) =

Geary is a given name. Notable people with the name include:

- Geary Eppley (1895–1978), American university administrator, professor, agronomist, military officer, athlete and track and field coach
- Geary Gravel (born 1951), American science fiction author and sign language interpreter
- Geary Higgins, American politician from Virginia
- Geary Hobson (born 1941), Cherokee, Quapaw/Chickasaw scholar, editor and writer of fiction and poetry

== See also ==
- Geary (surname)
