= Giri =

Giri may refer to:

== People ==
- Agam Singh Giri (1927–1971), Indian Nepali poet and lyricist
- Anish Giri (born 1994), Dutch chess prodigy and grandmaster
- Deepak Giri, Nepalese politician
- Deepak Raj Giri, Nepalese actor, director, and producer
- Dipak Giri (born 1984), Indian writer and academic
- Gehendra Giri, Nepalese politician
- Haridhos Giri, Hindu guru who disappeared in 1994
- Helen Giri, Indian musicologist and historian
- Kedar Prasad Giri (1944–2018), 18th Chief Justice of Nepal
- Laxmi Giri (born 1955), Nepali actress
- Maya Giri (born 1929), athlete who competed for England
- Neelam Giri, Indian pediatric hematologist/oncologist
- Padam Giri, Nepali communist politician
- Puran Giri, Indian cricketer
- Ram Bahadur Giri (born 1960), Nepalese boxer
- Satyananda Giri (1896–1971), Indian monk and Yukteswar Giri's chief monastic disciple in India
- Sunan Giri (born 1420), a Wali Sanga (Islamic saint) of Indonesia
- Tulsi Giri (1926–2018), Prime Minister of Nepal from 1975 to 1977
- V. Mohini Giri (born 1938), Indian community service worker and activist
- V. V. Giri, Varahagiri Venkata Giri (1894–1980), President of India from 1969 to 1974

== Places ==
- Giri, Iran, a village in Gilan Province, Iran
- Giri, Razavi Khorasan, a village in Razavi Khorasan Province, Iran
- Giri River, a tributary of the Yamuna River in northern India
- Giri or Ngiri River, a tributary of the Ubangi River in the Democratic Republic of the Congo

== Other uses ==
- Giri (film), a 2004 Tamil film written and directed by Sundar C
- Giri (Japanese), a Japanese value roughly corresponding to "duty", "obligation", or even "burden of obligation"
- Giri or Kire language, spoken in Papua New Guinea
- Giri/Haji, a 2019 British television series
- Genetic Information Research Institute, a private, non-profit research institution based in Mountain View, California
- Cyclone Giri of the 2010 North Indian Ocean cyclone season

== See also ==
- Geary (disambiguation)
