= Helen Giri Syiem =

Indian musicologist and historian

- Born: Meghalaya, India
- Occupations: Musicologist; Historian
- Known for: Khasi music
- Awards: Padma Shri

Helen Giri Syiem is an Indian musicologist and historian, known for her efforts in promoting Khasi music tradition. A former member of faculty at the North Eastern Hill University, she is a member of the executive council of the Sangeet Natak Akademi.

== Biography ==
She is known to have contributed in the restoration of traditional Khasi musical instruments and has instituted a scholarship fund at the Martin Luther Christian University, Shillong for the promotion of Khasi music.

She assisted in the establishment of 35 traditional music institutes and has organized music festivals, besides working for the rehabilitation of physically disabled children.

Her book, Khasi Under British Rule, 1824-1947, is a historical narrative of Khasi life during the pre-independence period.

The Government of India awarded her the fourth highest civilian honour of the Padma Shri in 2008, for her contributions to Khasi music.

== See also ==
- Khasi people
