= Pushpagiri, Andhra Pradesh =

Pushpagiri
- Village
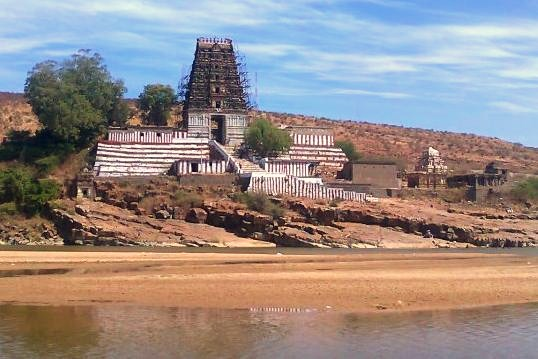
- Sri Chennakesava Swamy temple in Pushpagiri village

- Location in Andhra Pradesh, India
- Coordinates: 14.595°N 78.757°E
- Country: India
- State: Andhra Pradesh
- District: Kadapa

Languages
  - Official: Telugu
- Time zone: UTC+5:30 (IST)

Pushpagiri is a village in Kadapa District, in Andhra Pradesh, India. It lies on the Penna River, about 16 km to the north of Kadapa. It has a number of important temples, of which the largest, Chennakesava Temple, is thought to date from 1298 AD.

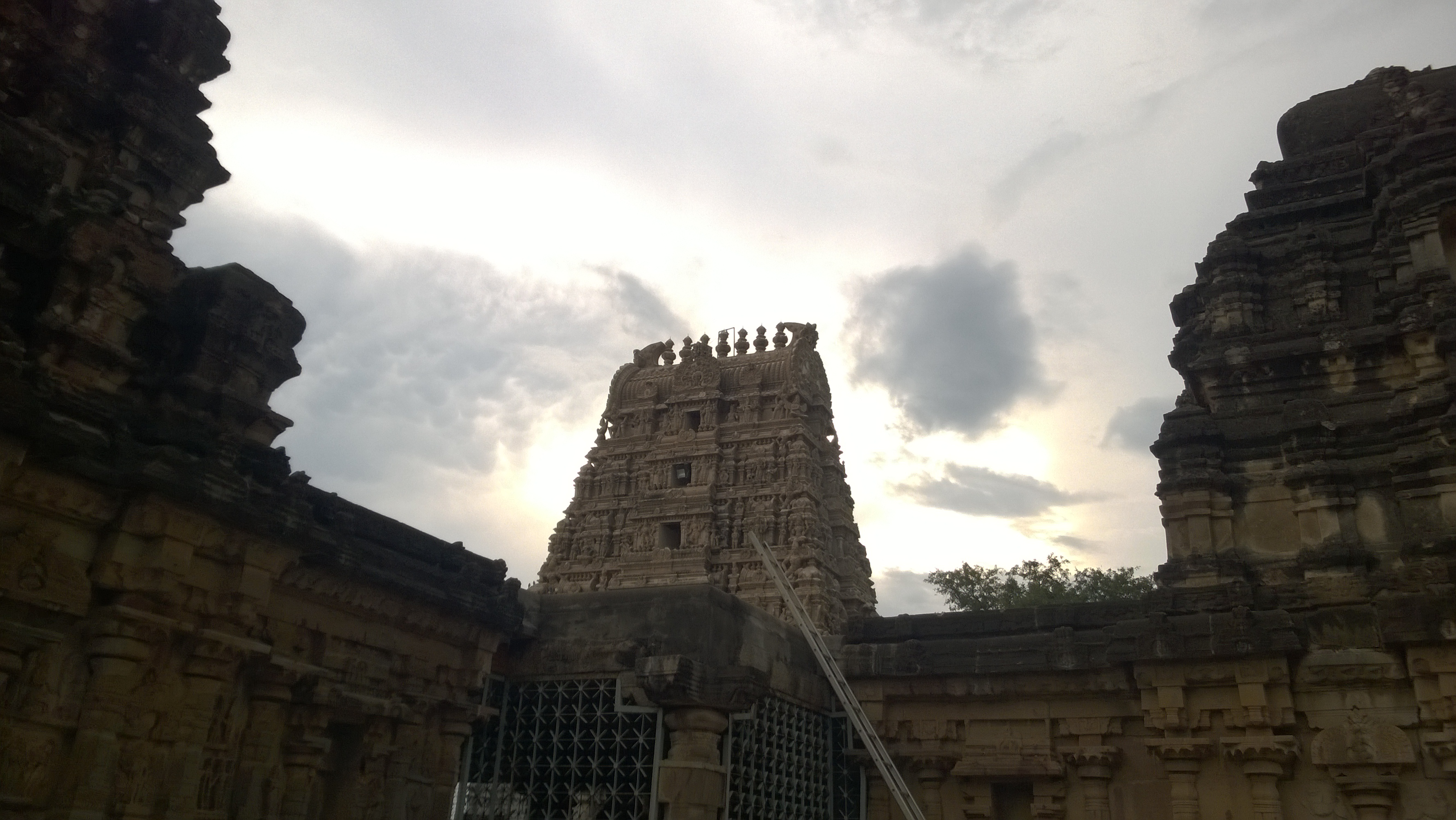
Chennakesava Swamy Temple, Pushpaigiri, Andhra Pradesh

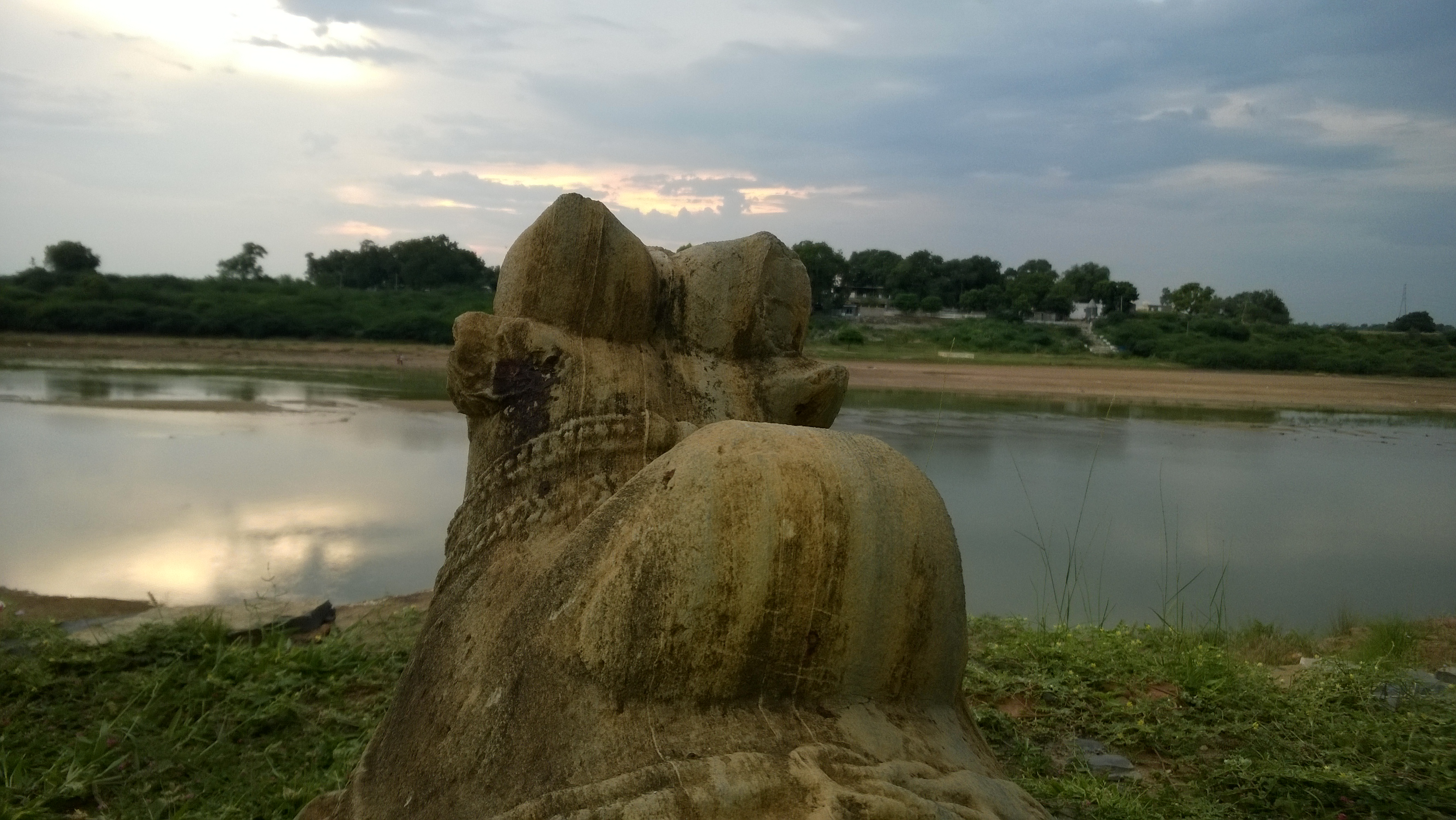
Nandi at Chennakesava Temple, Pushpagiri, Andhra Pradesh

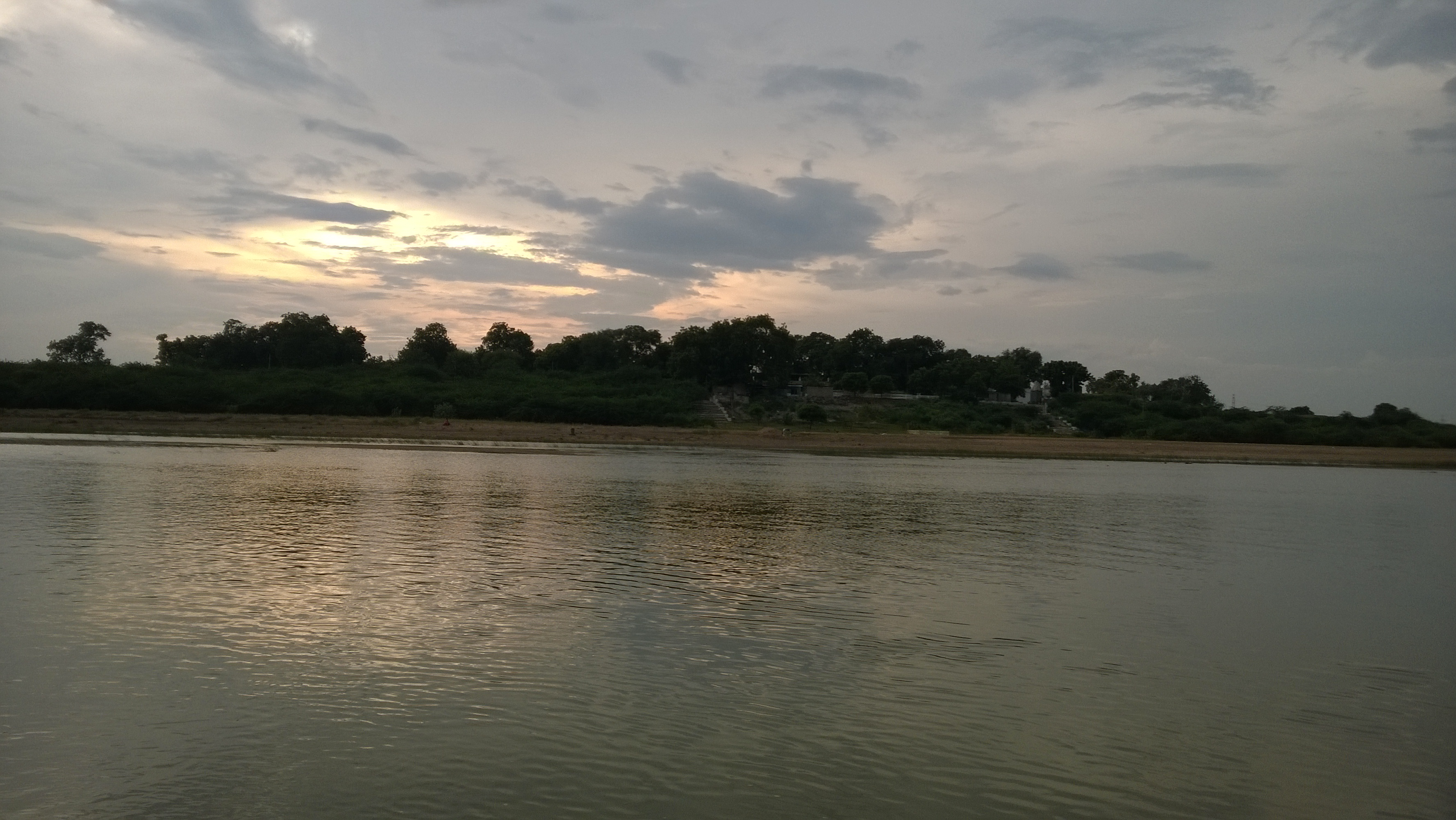
Pinakini River, Pushpagiri, Andhra Pradesh, India
