= Sri Manjunatha (film) =

- Theatrical release poster
- Directed by: Kovelamudi Raghavendra Rao
- Written by: J. K. Bharavi (story and dialogues)
- Produced by: Nara Jaya Sridevi
- Starring: Chiranjeevi; Arjun; Soundarya; Ambareesh; Meena; Sumalatha; Aanand Vardhan
- Cinematography: Sundarnath Suvarna
- Edited by: R. Janardhan
- Music by: Hamsalekha
- Production company: Chinni films
- Release date: 22 June 2001
- Running time: 157 minutes
- Country: India
- Languages: Kannada; Telugu

Sri Manjunatha is a 2001 Indian Kannada and Telugu-language hagiographical film directed by Kovelamudi Raghavendra Rao. The film stars Chiranjeevi, Arjun Sarja, Soundarya, Meena, Ambareesh, and Sumalatha in main roles. The film is based on the life of the Shiva devotee, Bhakta Manjunatha of the Kotilingeshwara Temple.

The film was partially reshot in Telugu under the same title with Chiranjeevi's scenes redone and Brahmanandam and Tanikella Bharani replacing Dwarakish and Mimicry Dayanand respectively. All other scenes were dubbed from the Kannada original.

The film was released on 22 June 2001 worldwide. Upon release, the film received positive reviews and was a moderate success at the box office. The film was screened in the International Film Festival of India.

== Background ==
Manjunatha is an aspect of Shiva. Manju means 'snow' and Natha means 'lord.' Since Lord Shiva resides on Mount Kailash, and hence the ruler of the Himalaya Mountains, as he is the lord of that loka (dimension), he is called Manjunatha. Manjunatha is one of the most common names in Karnataka state for males and Manjula for females. Both are commonly called by the nickname name "Manju." This is mostly because of the Sri Dharmasthala Manjunatha Swami Temple located in Dharmasthala, Karnataka

== Plot ==
Manjunatha is an atheist, but a good person helping others in need and fighting evil. Even though Manjunatha hates his namesake Lord Siva, the latter loves his would be devotee. Being an atheist, Manjunatha always scolds Lord Shiva which is watched by Shiva's vehicle Nandi and his attendant Bhrungi. Manjunatha meets Katyayini who is about to become a devadasi (Servant of the Lord) and marries her. Soon they beget a son, Siddhartha ("Siddhu"), who like his mother is a staunch devotee of Lord Shiva.

After marriage Manjunatha realizes the existence of Lord Shiva and slowly transforms himself into a great devotee of Lord Shiva. With his devotion, he lights the lamps of the Manjunatha Temple in Dharmasthala without using a matchstick and wins the hearts of everybody including the local King, Ambikeswara Maharaju who invites him to his court where he felicitates Manjunatha much to Manjunatha's dislike. Here, the king realises that Manjunatha is going to die.

In the meantime Manjunatha starts a Koti Lingam Puja with over 1,000 lingams worshipped and both Manjunatha and the king singing the Lingashtakam and performing the puja. Manjunatha is also troubled by his enemies and is aided by Lord Shiva who comes in various disguises to save his devotee helping him and his wife attain salvation.

== Cast ==
- Chiranjeevi as Lord Shiva
- Arjun Sarja as Manjunatha
- Soundarya as Katyayani
- Meena as Goddess Parvati
- Ambareesh as Ambikeshwara Maharaja
- Sumalatha as Sumalata Devi
- Dwarakish / Tanikella Bharani (Telugu) as Bhrungi
- Mimicry Dayanand / Brahmanandam (Telugu) as Nandi
- Anand
- Aanand Vardhan
- Sadashiva Brahmavar

=== Special appearances ===
- Sudha Rani as Bhoodevi
- Abhijit
- Kumar Govind
- Vinod Raj
- Yamuna as Ganga

== Production ==
The film was launched at Sri Manjunatheswara temple at Dharmasthala and another at Ganesha Temple at R T Nagar in Bangalore and also at Kanteerava Studios.

== Soundtrack ==
=== Kannada Version ===
All music is composed by Hamsalekha

Tracklist
No.	Title	Lyrics	Singer(s)	Length
1.	"Yavon Kanda Ninna"	Hamsalekha	S. P. Balasubrahmanyam, K. S. Chithra	6:03
2.	"Brahmamurari"	Bhakta Rushi	Ramesh Chandra, Nanditha	3:10
3.	"Koti Janmada"	Hamsalekha	Chorus	0:45
4.	"Sriman Maha Manjunatha"	Sri Vedavyaasa	Chorus	1:33
5.	"Obbane Obbane (Bit)"	Hamsalekha	Nanditha	0:36
6.	"Sri Manjunatha Charithe (Shiva Purana)"	Hamsalekha	S. P. Balasubrahmanyam, K. S. Chithra	7:51
7.	"Ee Paadha Punya Pada"	Hamsalekha	S. P. Balasubrahmanyam	5:16
8.	"Jogappa Jogamma"	Hamsalekha	S. P. Balasubrahmanyam, K. S. Chithra	5:30
9.	"Thanuvina Manege"	Hamsalekha	S. P. Balasubrahmanyam	4:35
10.	"Dharma Jyothi (Mangala Slokam)"	Sri Vedavyaasa	Hemanth Kumar	2:06
11.	"Om Mahaprana Deepam"	Sri Vedavyaasa	Shankar Mahadevan	4:59
12.	"Ananda Paramananda"	Hamsalekha	S. P. Balasubrahmanyam, K. S. Chithra	4:31
13.	"Aksharaya Namaha"	J. K. Bharavi	Hemanth Kumar, K. S. Chithra	6:14
14.	"Hey Hey Bindege"	Hamsalekha	Hemanth Kumar, Nanditha	5:08
15.	"Obbane Obbane"	Hamsalekha	S. P. Balasubrahmanyam	4:04
Total length:				01:01:34

=== Telugu Version ===
All music is composed by Hamsalekha

Tracklist
No.	Title	Lyrics	Singer(s)	Length
1.	"Mangala Slokam - Dharmasthala"	Sri Vedavyaasa	Hemanth Kumar	2:05
2.	"Om Mahaprana Deepam"	Sri Vedavyaasa	Shankar Mahadevan	4:59
3.	"Ananda Paramananda"	Viswanatha Sastry	S. P. Balasubrahmanyam, Nanditha	4:32
4.	"Oho Garala Kanta"	Bhuvanachandra	S. P. Balasubrahmanyam, Anuradha Sriram	6:05
5.	"Hey Hey Bittiri"	Chandrabose	Hemanth Kumar, Nanditha	5:08
6.	"Aksharaya Namaha"	J. K. Bharavi	Hemanth Kumar, K. S. Chithra	6:14
7.	"Brahmamurari"	Bhakta Rushi	Ramesh Chandra, Nanditha	3:10
8.	"Okkade Okkade"	J. K. Bharavi	S. P. Balasubrahmanyam	4:06
9.	"Olammo Gowrammo"	J. K. Bharavi	S. P. Balasubrahmanyam, Swarnalatha	5:29
10.	"Aakashame Aakaramai - Sri Manjunatha Charitham"	Jonnavittula Ramalingeswara Rao	S. P. Balasubrahmanyam, Anuradha Sriram	7:51
11.	"Ee Padam"	Samavedam Shanmukha Sarma	S. P. Balasubrahmanyam	5:18
12.	"Enni Janmala Phalamidi"	J. K. Bharavi	Chorus	0:45
13.	"Swagathamayya"	J. K. Bharavi	S. P. Balasubrahmanyam	4:36
14.	"Sri Maham Manjunatha"	Sri Vedavyaasa	Chorus	1:31
15.	"Okkade Okkade (bit)"	J. K. Bharavi	Nanditha	0:37
Total length:				01:01:15

== Reception ==
A critic from Chitraloka wrote that "In the annals of Kannada film history this film is undoubtedly a masterpiece". A critic from Online Bangalore wrote that "This film is undoubtedly a masterpiece. It has a wonderful star cast, director, music, singers, [and] cinematography".

Regarding the partially reshot Telugu version, Jeevi of Idlebrain.com wrote that "He takes us through a journey till the heart-touching climax by making the best use of the histrionics of Chiranjeevi, Arjun and other actors". A critic from Full Hyderabad wrote that "'Sri Manjunatha' is an example of doing justice to a particular genre with complete honesty. It will reap the dividends due to this trait".

== Accolades ==
Award	Date of ceremony (Note: Date is linked to the article about the awards held that year, wherever possible.)	Category	Nominee(s)	Result	Ref.
2001–02 Karnataka State Film Awards	21 January 2003	Best Art Direction	Arun Sagar	Won	
2001–02 Karnataka State Film Awards	21 January 2003	Best Lyricist	Hamsalekha	Won	
