= Kotilingeshwara =

Temple in Kammasandra, Karntaka, India

Kotilingeshwara Temple
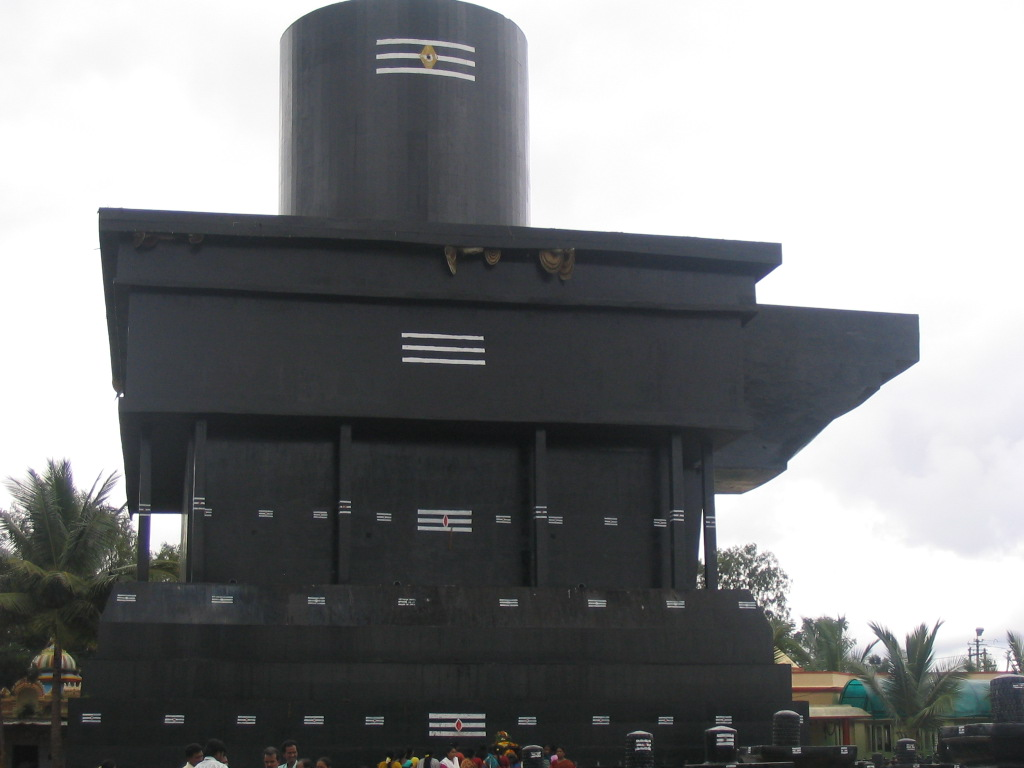

- Kotilingeshwara Temple, Kammasandra, Kolar, Karnataka

Religion
- Affiliation: Hinduism
- District: Kolar
- Deity: Shiva
- Festival: Maha Shivaratri

Location
- Location: Kammasandra
- State: Karnataka
- Country: India
- Interactive map of Kotilingeshwara Temple
- Coordinates: 12°59′42.7″N 78°17′44.9″E

Architecture
- Elevation: 839.39 m (2,754 ft)

Kotilingeshwara Temple (Kannada: ಕೋಟಿಲಿಂಗೇಶ್ವರ) a Hindu temple in the village of Kammasandra in Kolar district, Karnataka, India. The presiding deity of the temple is Shiva. The temple has one of the largest Shivalingams in the world.

== Background Information ==
According to legend the lingas were first placed at what became the temple site by a former atheist who had become a devotee of Shiva, a story which was made into a hagiographical film, Sri Manjunatha, released in 2001.

The main attraction of the temple is a huge linga measuring 108 ft (33 m) tall and 35 ft (11 m) tall Nandi idol, surrounded by lakhs of small lingas spread over an area of 15 acres (61,000 m^{2}). The Nandi idol is installed over a platform which is 60 feet (18 m) in length, 40 feet (12 m) in width and 4 feet (1.2 m) in height. There are eleven small temples constructed within the premises for various deities. A water tank is set up close to the Linga, used by the devotees to perform Abhisheka. The idols vary between 1 foot (0.30 m) and 3 feet (0.91 m) in height. There is a guest house, a marriage hall, a meditation hall and an exhibition center attached to the temple. The temple has the largest and tallest linga in Asia. The number of lingas is ~6.5 lakhs (i.e. 10 lingas within 1 m^{2} of land, implies 61,000 m^{2} of land can accommodate approximately 6.1 lakhs of lingas) and not one crore (ten million).

== About Kotilingeshwara Temple ==
‘Koti’ in Kannada means a crore and Kotilingeshwara is 1 crore Shivalingas. The temple with the tallest Shivalinga in the world is installed here along with 90+ lakhs of other Shivalingas of different sizes. The 33 mts high Shivalinga and 11 mts high Lord Nandi, the Bull are the main attractions of the temple. The temple is open for donations of Shivalingas of various sizes which can be installed with the name of the donor embedded on it. In 1980, the temple was initiated and constructed by Swami Sambha Shiva Murthy. The road to the temple is easily approachable and is located in Kammasanadra, a small village in Kolar District. Even though there are a lot of devotees who visit the temple every day, the temple attracts millions of tourists on Maha Shivaratri. Shivaratri is a festival dedicated to Lord Shiva and usually occurs in the month of February or March. There are 11 smaller temples dedicated to the other deities like Lord Vishnu, Brahma, Mahesh, Rama, Goddess Annapoorneshwari, Goddess Karumaari Amma, Lord Venkataramani Swamy, Lord Panduranga Swamy, Lord Rama, Sita and Lakshmana Temple, Lord Panchamukha Ganapathy, Lord Anjaneya, and the Goddess Kannika Parameshwari Temple in the same premises.

== Temple Timings ==
The temple typically opens at 6:00 am on most days and closes at 9:00 pm
