= Emma Geary =

Irish artist

Emma Geary (born November 1977 in Larne (artist name: Anarkitty) is a pop-surrealist artist from Northern Ireland. She currently lives outside Belfast.

== Early life and education ==
Geary went to the University of Ulster in Belfast and gained a B.A(Hons) degree in Art and Design, specializing in Visual Communications. After graduation she moved to London for 6 years where she worked for a number of ad agencies and graphic design houses.

== Early career ==
While working in London for graphic design houses, Geary mostly worked on digital-based character illustrations. Her work has appeared in publications such as Creative Review, Computer Arts and DPI (Taiwan) magazine. She also created works for MTV, BBC and Pictoploasma. However, it was not before she returned to Northern Ireland that she started to move her characters onto canvas and started her own career.

== Anarkitty works and style ==
After having created Anarkitty as her artist synonym (she also signs all her works with an illustrated 'AK'), her influences came from manga, tattoo, pinup girls, graffiti and toy cultures. She says that she was most inspired by artists like Allen Lee, Brian Fraud, Kay Neelson and Banksy, but also The London Police, Flying Fortress and Dalak. However, she was most inspired by Miss Van and Fafi's work. Currently, Anarkitty has focused on Pop Surrealism which is also represented by artists like Walton Ford, Mark Ryden, Ana Bagayan, David LaChapelle, Kehinde Wiley, Tara Mc Pherson, Rebecca Stevenson, Audrey Kawasaki, Stella im Hultberg, Amy Sol and Jaw Cooper.

== Notable exhibitions ==
- Poisoned Lace Exhibition; The Frameworks Gallery, Belfast, Northern Ireland
- Adorned Exhibition; FB69 Gallery, Münster, Germany
