= Pushpagiri Temple Complex =

Pushpagiri Temple complex
- Religious complex
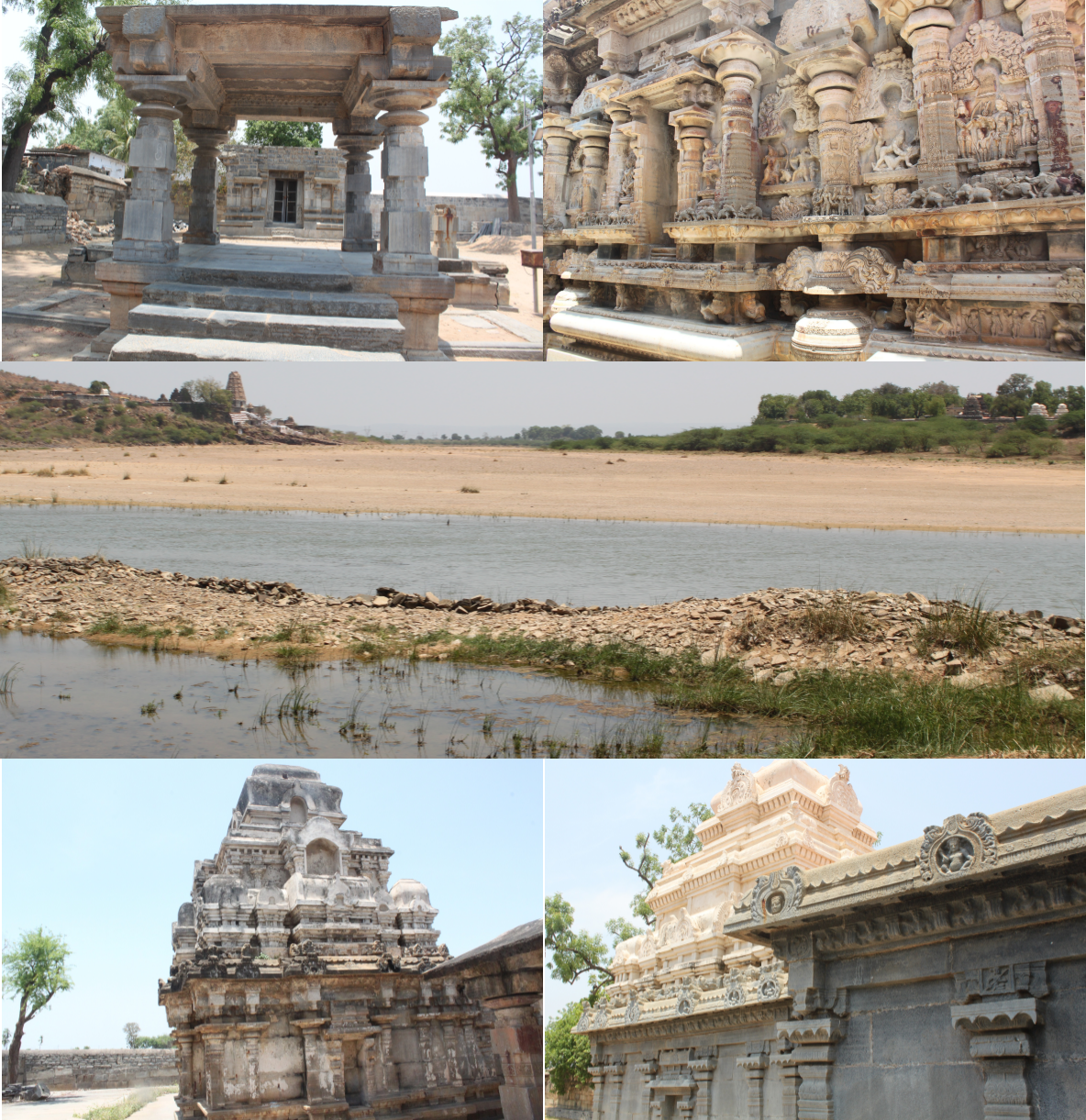
- Top left to bottom left, Vaidyanatheswara Swamy temple; reliefs on Chennakesava Swamy's temple walls; Pushpagiri and the river Penna; Indranatheswara Swamy temple; Trikuteswara Swamy temple

- Location in Andhra Pradesh, India
- Coordinates: 14.594749°N 78.763004°E
- Country: India
- State: Andhra Pradesh
- Region: Rayalaseema
- District: Kadapa
- Established: c. 180 CE

Area
  - Total: 7.5 km^{2} (2.9 sq mi)
- Elevation: 380 m (1,250 ft)

Population (2001)
  - Total: 500 (approx)
  - Density: 67/km^{2} (170/sq mi)

Languages
  - Official: Telugu
- Time zone: UTC+5:30 (IST)
- PIN: 516162
- Telephone code: +91 - 8562
- Vehicle registration: AP04

Pushpagiri Temple Complex is a temple complex located in Kadapa district in Andhra Pradesh, India. Founded around 7th Century CE, it houses some of the oldest temple congregations in the region.

Srisaila Khanda of Skand Purana praises this temple as 'Nirvrutti Sangameswara' because of its reputation of devotees giving up lives in devotion to Shiva.

Whatever is the legend if is associated, it is now widely acknowledged that the temple of Sri Vaidyanatheswara has been in this temple complex from at least around 7th Century CE. This is corroborated by various Puranas including the Srisaila Khanda of Skanda Purana and Sriranga Mahatmya of Garuda Purana.

Geographically Pushpagiri temple complex is located on the banks of the Pinakini river that meanders through the District which has origins on Nandi Hills in Karnataka and is at a distance of about 16 kilometres from the district headquarters.

== Geography ==
The temple complex is located at 380 metres (1,000 ft) above the sea level and covers an approximate area of 7.5 square kilometres (2.9 sq mi).

Despite the hot tropical summers in the region, there is always water in the area due to the underwater level butted by the river. Apart from the small arid mountainous area where the mound is supposed to have fallen, the entire region is full of greenery on all sides with plenty of crops mainly paddy.

During the rainy season, the area is quite a sight for the beholders. The river Pinakini flows from west to east, changing its course towards the south at Pushpagiri and soon after the hamlet of Sivalapalle, the river changes its course again to travel east finally opening into the sea in Nellore District.

== Climate ==
Pushpagiri shares a tropical climate with the Cuddapah district as with the encompassing region of Rayalaseema. The summers are long and hot with temperatures ranging between 37 °C and 45 °C. The river almost dries up during the summer season with water left only in some pools made by the previous flow. The summer will occur between the months of April and July.

With the onset of monsoons the climate starts cooling down and the river swells up during the rains which could sometimes be very hazardous especially during the torrential rains in the months of August to October when the occurrence of hurricanes and low depressions are very common. The floods to the river can cause the swirling waters to precariously perch on the edges of the banks with all the river bed submerged.

The months between September and March are relatively cool, December being the coolest with a temperature averaging between 17 °C and 23 °C. This is the best time to visit the temples around and many people visit the area to perform spiritual pilgrimages as well as for sightseeing.

Climate data for Pushpagiri, Cuddapah
| Month | Jan | Feb | Mar | Apr | May | Jun | Jul | Aug | Sep | Oct | Nov | Dec | Year |
|---|---|---|---|---|---|---|---|---|---|---|---|---|---|
| Mean daily maximum °C (°F) | 22 (72) | 28 (82) | 35 (95) | 40 (104) | 45 (113) | 40 (104) | 36 (97) | 35 (95) | 35 (95) | 35 (95) | 28 (82) | 22 (72) | 33 (92) |
| Mean daily minimum °C (°F) | 15 (59) | 19 (66) | 22 (72) | 27 (81) | 32 (90) | 29 (84) | 28 (82) | 27 (81) | 27 (81) | 27 (81) | 22 (72) | 17 (63) | 24 (76) |
Source: Indian Meteorological Department

== History ==
The temple is mentioned in the Skanda Purana in Srisaila Khanda, Rasaratnakara of Satyanatha.

It has architectural styles originating from the Early Cholas culminating in the modern architecture and houses a variety of temples that have varied ages and significance. Since there is a belief among the later kingdoms that reigned the region that from the joyful cosmic dance of Shiva at the Bhoga Nandeeswara Swamy temple on top of the Nandi Hills, three rivers took their origin. Pinakini or Penna River (in vernacular language), Arkavati and Palar.

=== Patronage under later kings and chieftains ===
Gangaya Sahini and Ambadeva who were the chieftains of Kakatiya dynasty built various other temples in the names of themselves as well as their wives and daughters which added to the complex.

== Architecture ==
The architectural styles of the Pushpagiri temple complex range from the age of Ikshvakus to the modern chieftains that subordinated to the kings of Vijayanagara empire. The geographical position of Cuddapah district with mountainous boundaries gave rise to a lot of local feudal kingdoms that have thwarted the onslaught of foreign rules (both Indian and foreign) for a long time. The temple complex has documented history from early Ikshvakus to the local Zamindars that ruled the area. To name a few, it has remnants of the past belonging to Ikshvakus, Pallavas, Cholas, Chalukyas, Rashtrakutas, Vaidumbas, Kayasthas and Vijayanagara empires.

Long before the struggle between Shaivites and Vaishnavites started, there was a sense of communal harmony amongst the people of Cuddapah district, especially those in the Pushpagiri region, It is evident from a variety of undamaged structures in the region that have stood side by side with no vandalism instigated by the various communal philosophies. There are various temples that stand testimony to this fact, two of which are just kilometers apart. The Vaishnavaite temple of Chennakesava and the temples surrounding it are of Indranatha, Bhimeswara, Trikuteswara and Vaidyanatheswara. While the Chennakesava temple stands towards the east bank of the river with its magnificent gateway-tower facing west, the Indranatha Swamy temple is ducked on the north bank of the river just opposite to the village of Pushpagiri. The earliest reference to this temple was made in an inscription in 1078 CE which registers a land by the Ahavamalladeva of Vaidumba dynasty. Another inscription dated 1182 CE grants some land in the area of Mulakanadu for the daily worship of the presiding deity of the temple.

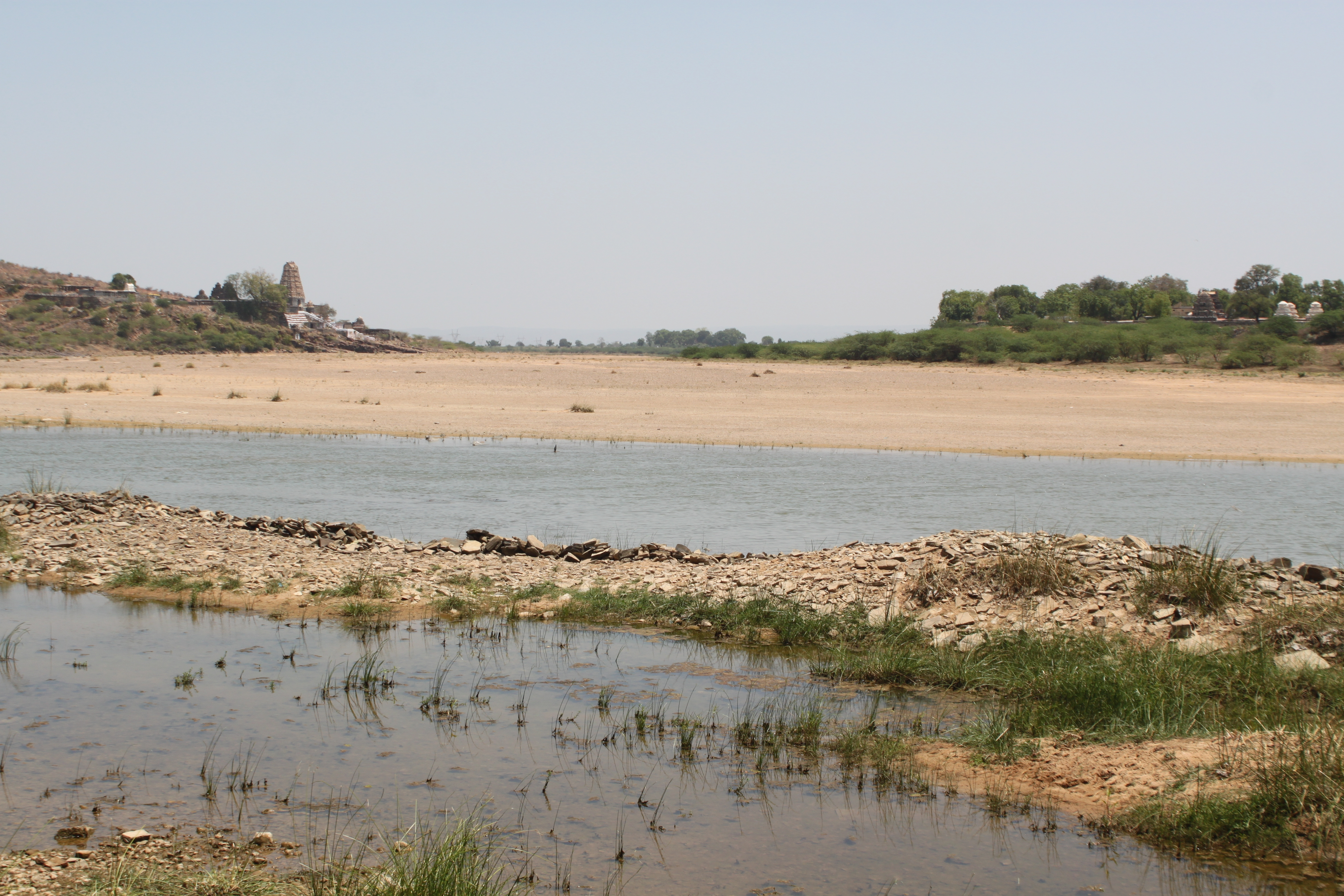
View of Pushpagiri Village and Chennakesava temple from Indranatha Swamy temple

The Indranatha Swamy temple faces east with a deck of steps arising from the Penna river There is a temple courtyard, a dilapidated gateway-tower. The Gopura of the temple is slightly towards the south-west of the temple and the temple is roughly a square. As one enters the temple there is a Mandapa towards the left supported by 12 pillars sculpted in perfect harmony. In the circumambulation path of the temple, towards the North-west is a "Bilva tree" which was considered sacred for the worship of Shiva.

Inline with the ancient architecture, the Linga housed inside a sanctum sanctorum before which is a 16-pillared Mukhamandapa that is surrounded by three sub-shrines. The Antaralaya emanates from the Mukhamantapa and leads to the main shrine where the Linga is still residing, though there is no worship as such. Outside the structure lies a Mandapa for Nandi. The characteristic feature of this temple is the 16-pillared and vast open-pillared mandapa that leads into the main shrine. All the sub-shrines are vacant with no idols of any sort except the main shrine.

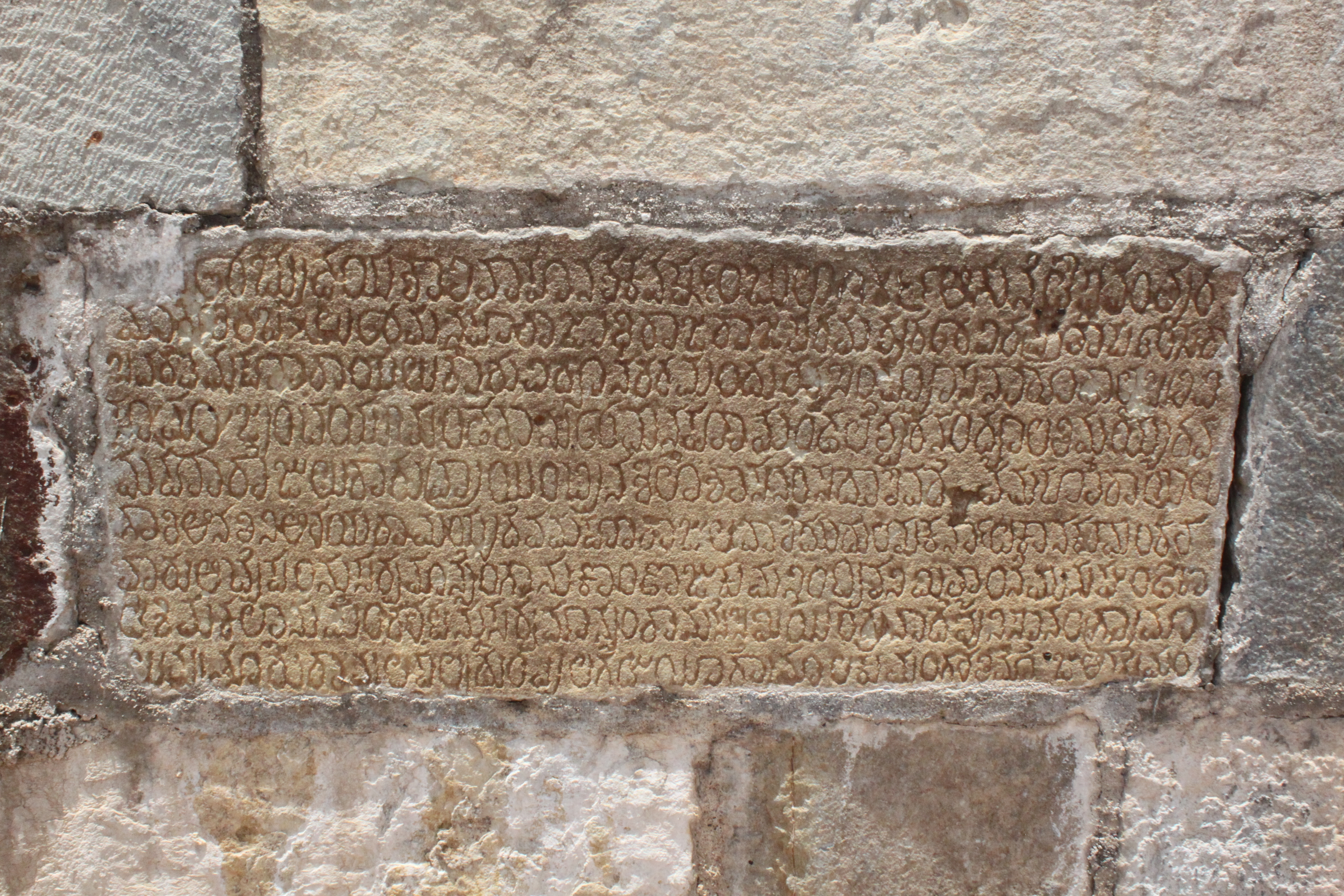
Inscription on the frontal wall of Indranatha Swamy temple, Pushpagiri

The Chennakesava temple faces west with a tall Dwajasthambam (flag-staff) overlooking the Penna river as it changes course from east to south. From the main gateway-tower, there is a path that leads to the Pushpagiri temples inside the hamlet of Pushpagiri. The temple of Chennakesava is an artistic structure with three Shrines inside and two sub-shrines outside of the elevated platform. The shrines inside the platform have the main deity of Chennakesava and Shrine to the left dedicated for a Shiva Linga. There is another small shrine where it was said that a seated structure of Umamaheswara Swamy was once present which was vandalised and left vacant now. A relief on the back wall of the shrine is supposed to be a replica of the deity that once adorned the Shrine. In the circumambulation path of the temple, there is another sub-shrine that houses a Shiva Linga towards the North-east side of the elevated platform.

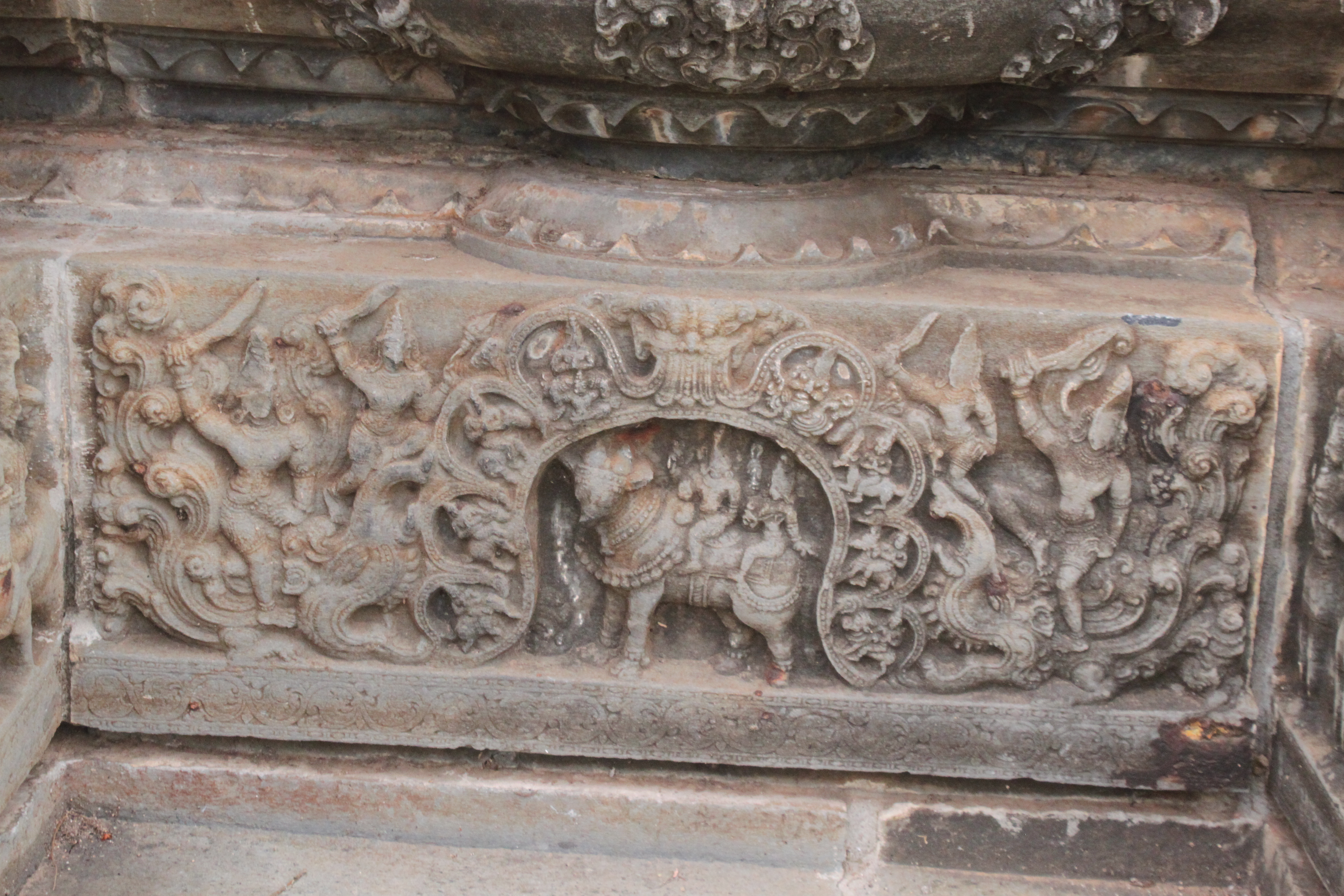
Umamaheswara Seated on a Bull, Chennakesava Temple, Pushpagiri Temple Complex, Cuddapah District

The temple is built with elaborate carvings on all sides and the shrines that house the Shiva Linga and the Chennakesava Swamy are separated by a ridge so that a Parikrama can be done for individual shrines. However, the characteristic feature of this temple is that both the Shrines have a single flag-staff that has Garuda with folded hands facing the Chennakesava Swamy shrine.

The shrine of Chennakesava faces west and houses an idol of standing Chennakesava Swamy towering at almost 10 feet. The elaborate carvings on the stone "halo" of the idol show the ten avataras of Vishnu. The temple is still in worship today with both the Linga and idol revered. As the Parikrama of the shrine is completed, there is a shrine for Rajyalakshmi Devi, the consort of Chennakesava Swamy. There is a mandapa towards the right of the shrine for Rajyalakshmi devi and a shrine lowering to the level of the steps into the river for Hanuman which seems to have been added to the complex at a later stage. The Gopuram that faces west has its origins from the time of Aghora Sivacharya and is renovated multiple times during various periods.

The carvings on the shrines depict various Hindu deities in various postures and depict the stories of Ramayana and Mahabharatha. Most of the carvings are in a relatively better position than Indranatha Swamy temple and the temple is currently under the protection of Central Archaeological Survey of India (ASI) catalogued #41 as Sivakesava Swamy temple.

== Inscriptions ==
Pushpagiri temple complex has a variety of inscriptions ranging a wide range of periods. The architectural styles of the temples that adorn the complex have undergone quite a lot of changes during the rules of various Kings and their feudal subjects.

Some of the inscriptions have either become non-readable or have worn out due to wither negligence or vandalism of the subsequent rulers. Some of the noteworthy inscriptions that could are still legible are as below:

1. Trailokya Malla Raju - In the year 991 CE, Malla Raju has noticed that the main idol of the Chennakesava Swamy temple was in a dilapidated situation and has undertaken a restoration work. An inscription to this effect is visible on the temple walls. A stepped route from the river to the temple has also been built during this time. The inscription has been written in old Kannada and Tamil scripts.
2. Murari Kesavaraju Somadeva Raju - In the year 1062 CE, Somadeva Raju has ceded the village of Vadde Cheruvu to the Indranathaswamy temple and an inscription to this effect has been installed on the said temple premises.
3. Ahava Malla Raju - In the year 1073 CE, when Malla Raju was ruling the area from the town of Valluru, he ceded the village of Chintalapatturu to Indranathaswamy temple and has erected an inscription.
4. Malladeva Raju - In the year 1083, Malladeva Raju erected an inscription mentioning a hamlet of Kommaluru to Indranathaswamy temple.
5. Bilvuni Bijjana Pallava Raju - In the year 1104 CE, Pallava Raju presented the village Rakshinama to Indranathaswamy temple and an inscription to this effect is seen today in the temple.
6. Simhana Bhupati Raju - While the year of the inscription is not mentioned, Bhupati Raju presented the village of Lakshmipura to the Vaidyanatheswara Swamy temple.
7. Bhujabala Veera Malla Raju - After Simhana Bhupati Raju, Veera Malla Raju ascended to the throne and one of the inscription mention that he has presented some land for the daily maintenance of the Vaidyanatheswara temple.
8. Krishna Kannada Deva Raju - Another inscription which is undated mentions that Deva Raju has presented some land to the temples in Pushpagiri for the sake of maintenance. The inscription is in Kannada language and script.
9. Mallikshitisham Raju - In the year 1171, Mallikshitisham Raju has presented the villages of Gundapuram and Lilapusta Puram to the Nageswara temple for the sake of daily worship and maintenance.
10. Kamala Bhai - In the year 1178 CE, the queen of Gangaya Sahini, Kamala Bhai has visited the Kaleswaram temple and installed a Linga for Kaleswara. For the maintenance of the temple it was inscribed at Pedadurti that she has presented some land. Kamala Bhai once again visited Pushpagiri and presented the villages of Gangavaran or Ganganapalle in the year 1178 CE.
11. Kakatiya Ganapati Deva - In the year 1179 CE, a feudatory of Kakatiya Ganapati Deva by the name Kayastha Gangaya visited Pushpagiri and rededicated the villages presented by Kamala Bhai to the Vaidyanatheswara Swamy temple under the orders of Ganapati Deva.
12. Kayasta Gangaya Sahini - In the year 1179 CE, the chieftain of Kakatiya Empire, Gangaya Sahini belonging to the Kayastha community was made in charge of the Valluru Mandal in Kadapa district. He then ceded some land to Pushpagiri 'Sethicharyulu' towards the North-West of Pushpagiri. The inscription was erected in Nagari script. The same Ganagaya Sahini has mentioned in another inscription that he has also presented the village of Atluru which was at a distance of about 30 kilometres from Pushpagiri to the temple complex. The inscription to this effect was erected in the year 1196 CE.
13. Tripurari Sivayya - In the year 1226 CE, when Ambadeva, another chieftain of Kakatiya Empire was ruling the southern districts, Sivayya has presented some land to his Guru, 'Sivacharyulu' under the ayacut of Cuddapah Pond.
14. Sammeta Kampayya - In the year 1348 CE, a feudatory to the king of Nellore, Kampayya has circumabulated the hill of Pushpagiri for 1000 times and made some repairs to the ballasts of the Chennakesava temple and other temples in the complex.
15. Deva Raya - In the year 1406 CE, Deva Raya has visited Pushpagiri and erected an inscription at the Indranatha Swany temple. The inscription is currently illegible due to climatic wear and tear.
16. Krishna Deva Raya - In the year 1509 CE, as soon as Krishna Deva Raya was instilled on throne at Vijayanagara, he has presented the village of Chinnamachupalle to Pushpagiri Chennakesava Swamy temple A Kannada inscription to this effect has been found in the village of Chinnamachupalle.

== Gallery ==
Below is a gallery of the exquisitely detailed carvings on the walls of the shrines at the temple of Chennakesava Swamy (Sivakesava Swamy) temple in Pushpagiri.

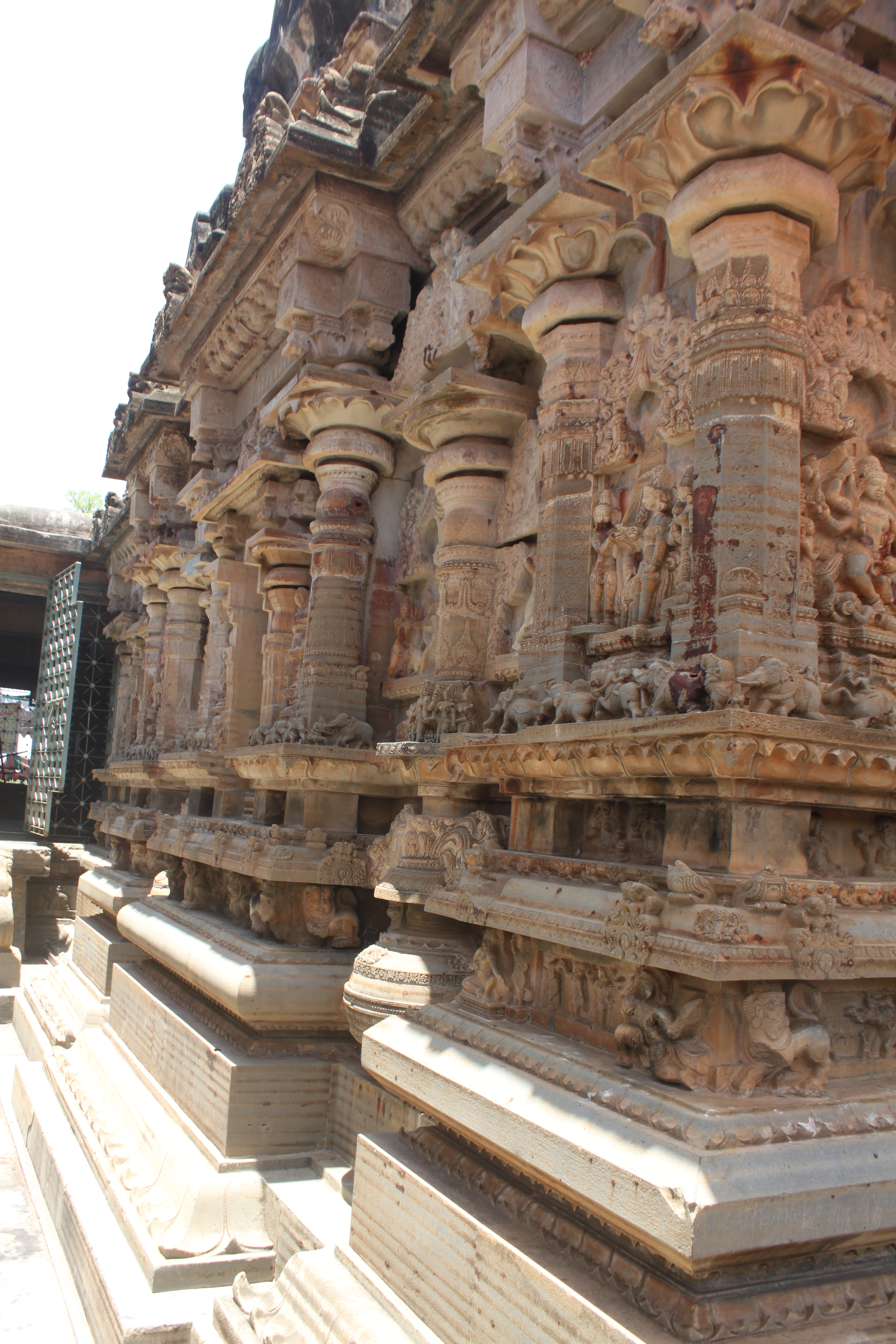
The ridge between the two inner shrines, Chennakesava temple, Pushpagiri

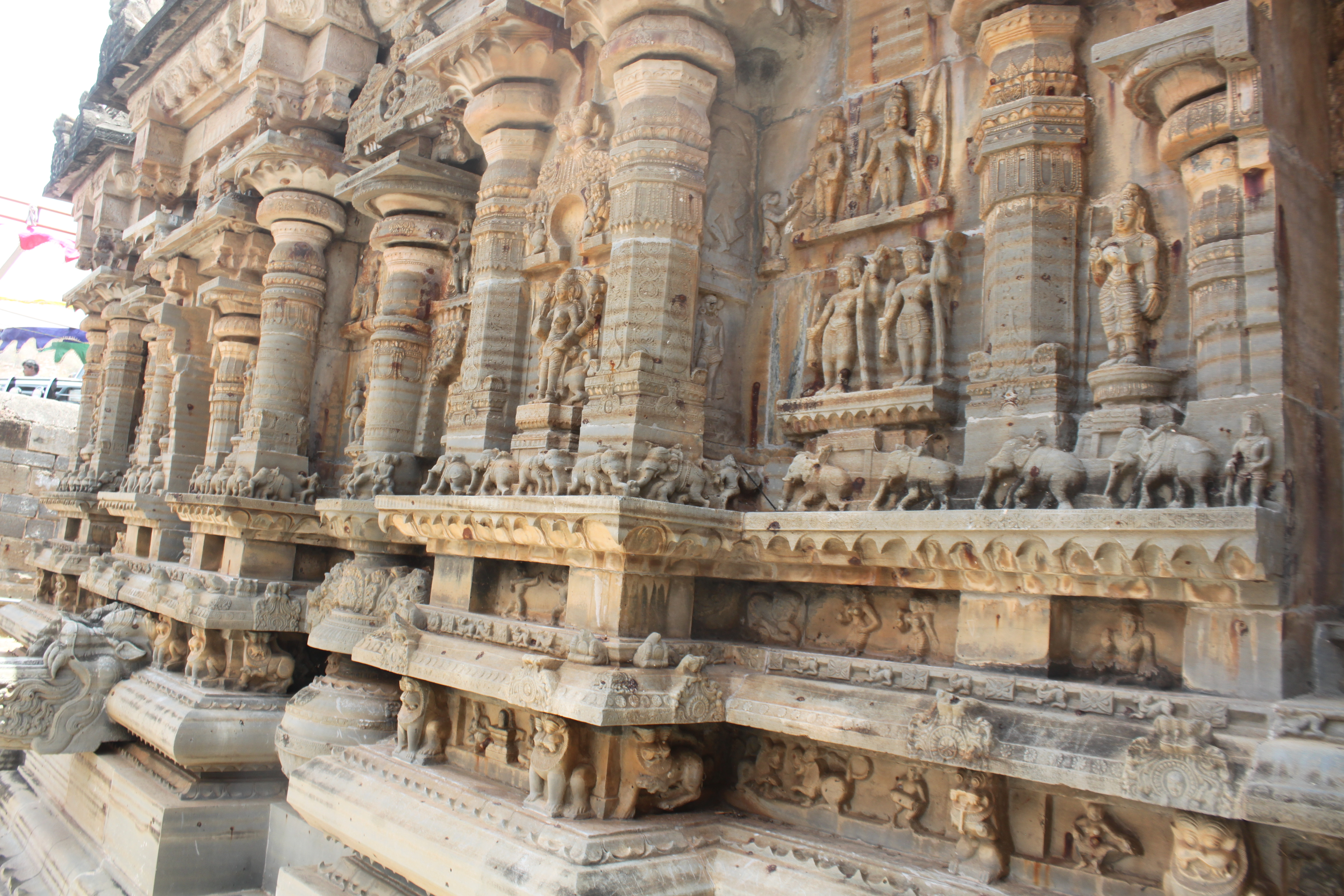
Chola Style architecture with Puranic sculptures

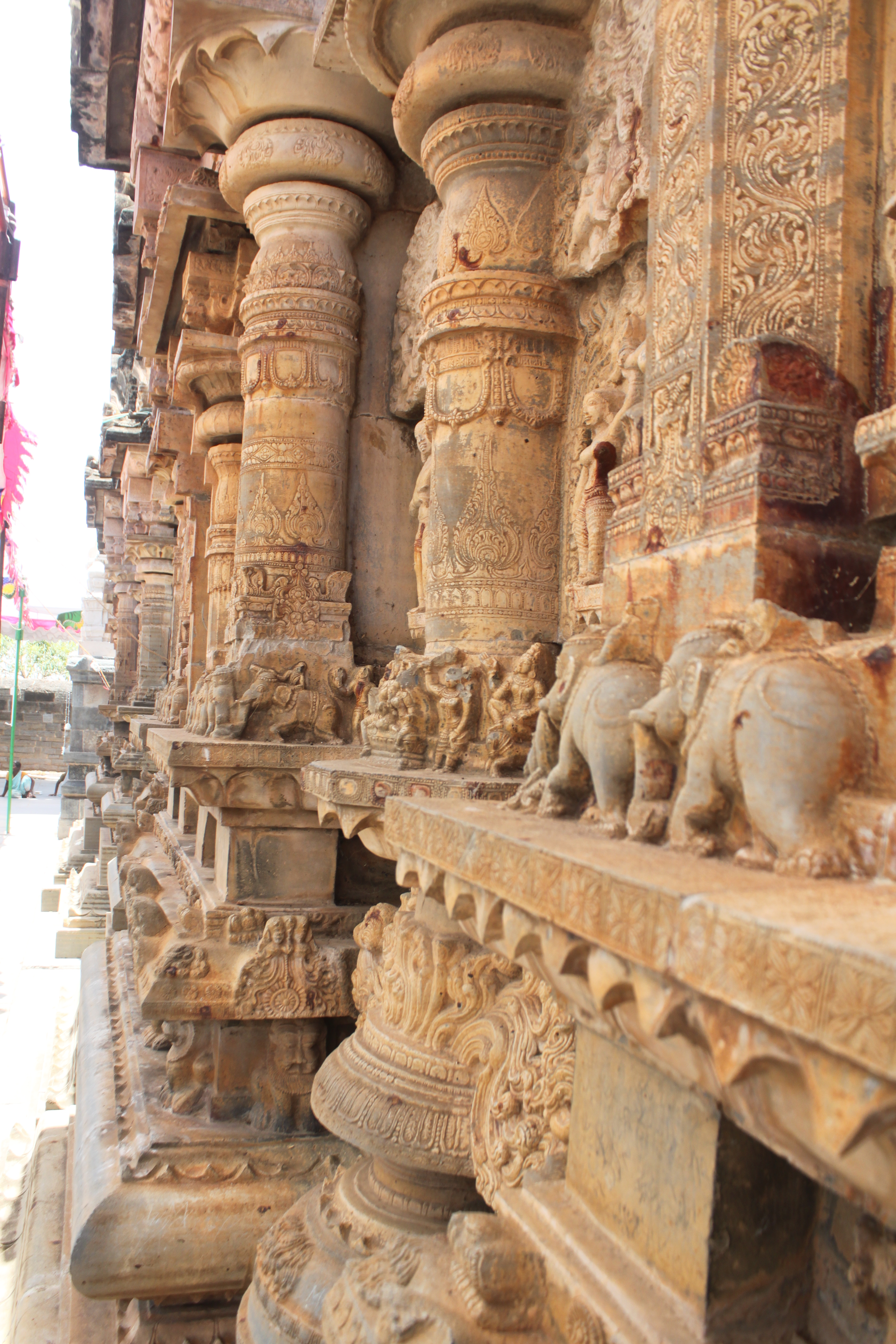
Intricate details of Chola style architecture

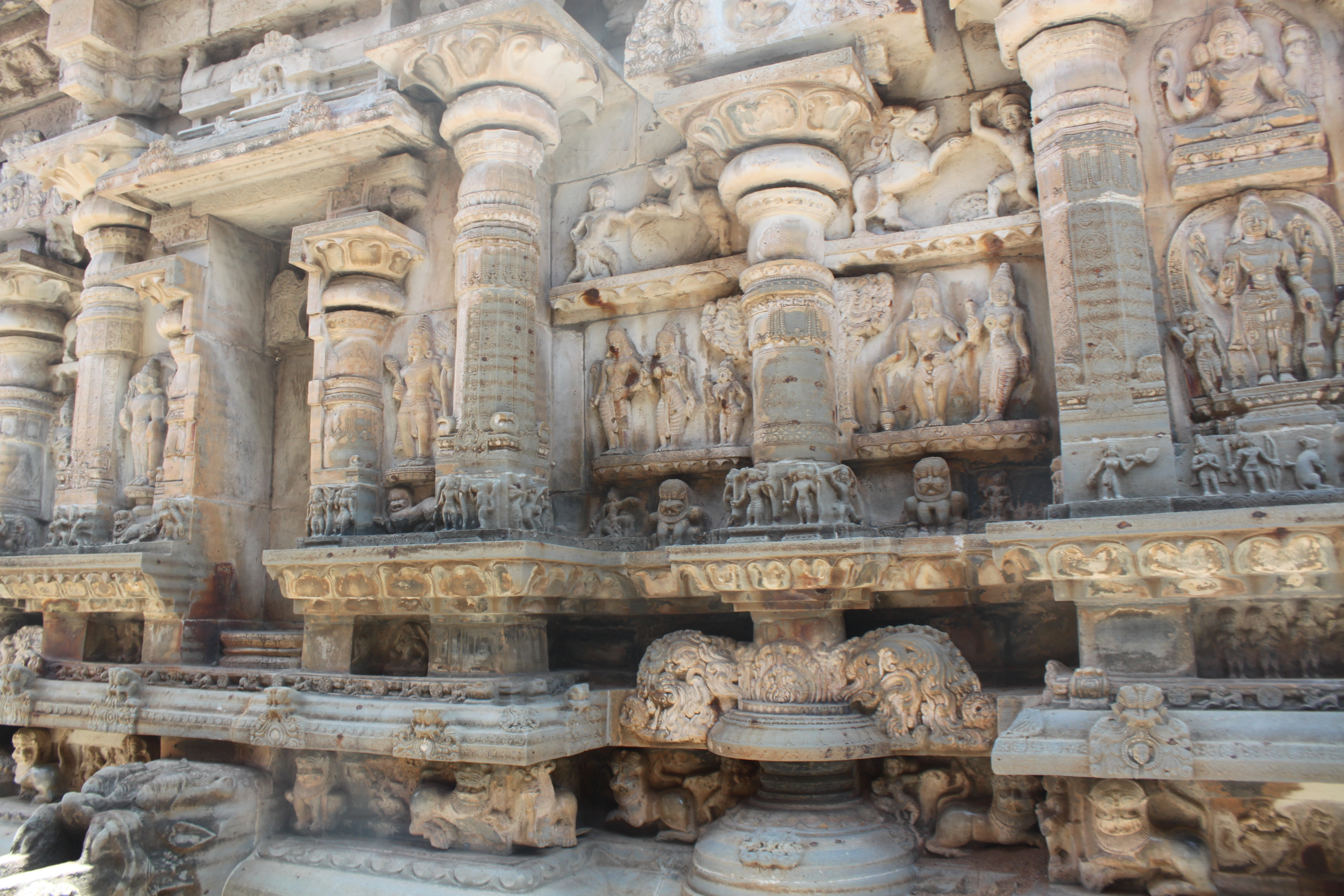
Pot shaped ballasts in temple architecture, characteristic of Cholas, Chennakesava Swamy temple, Pushpagiri

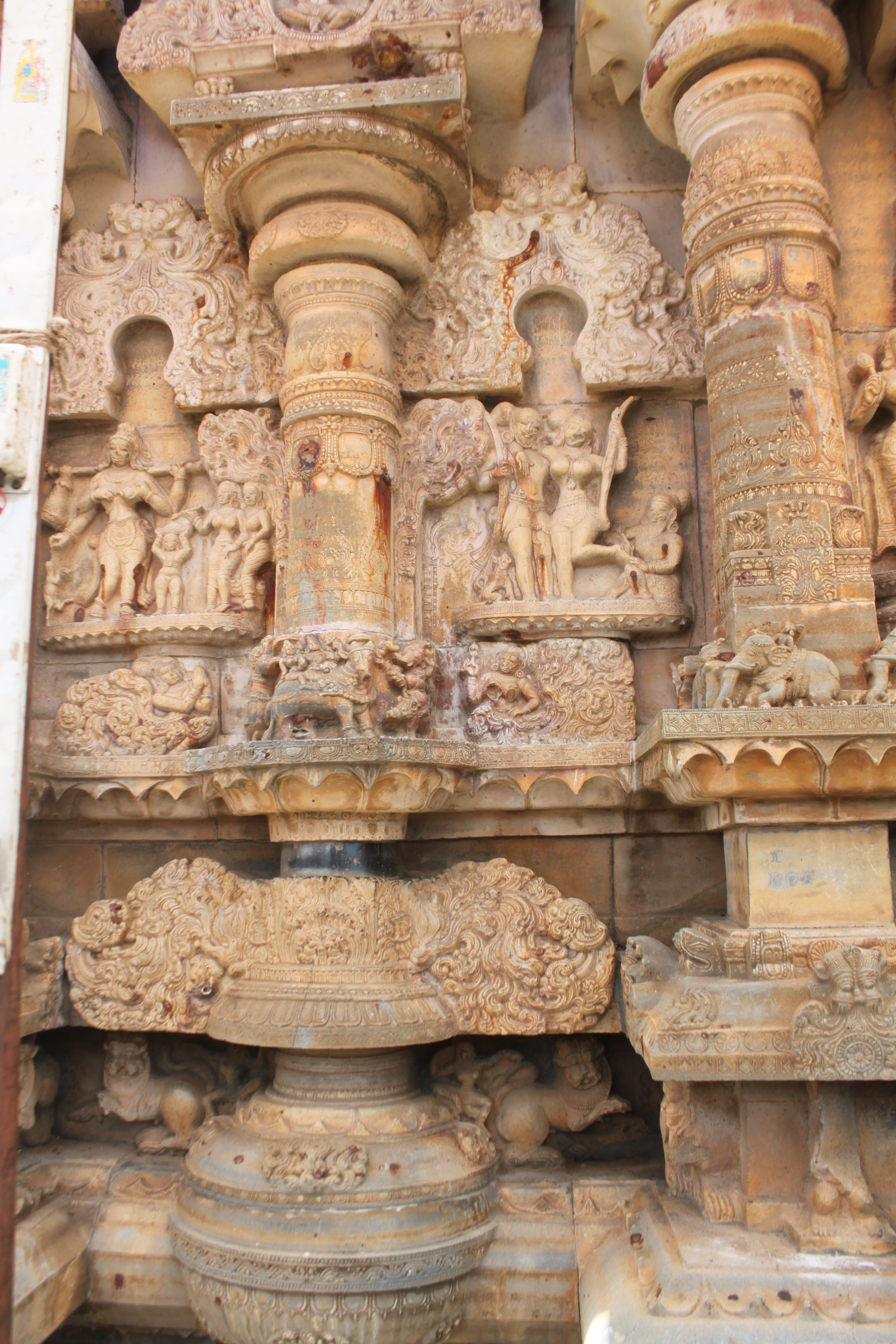
Pot shaped buttress for the temple architecture, Chola age, Chennakesava Swamy temple, Pushpagiri

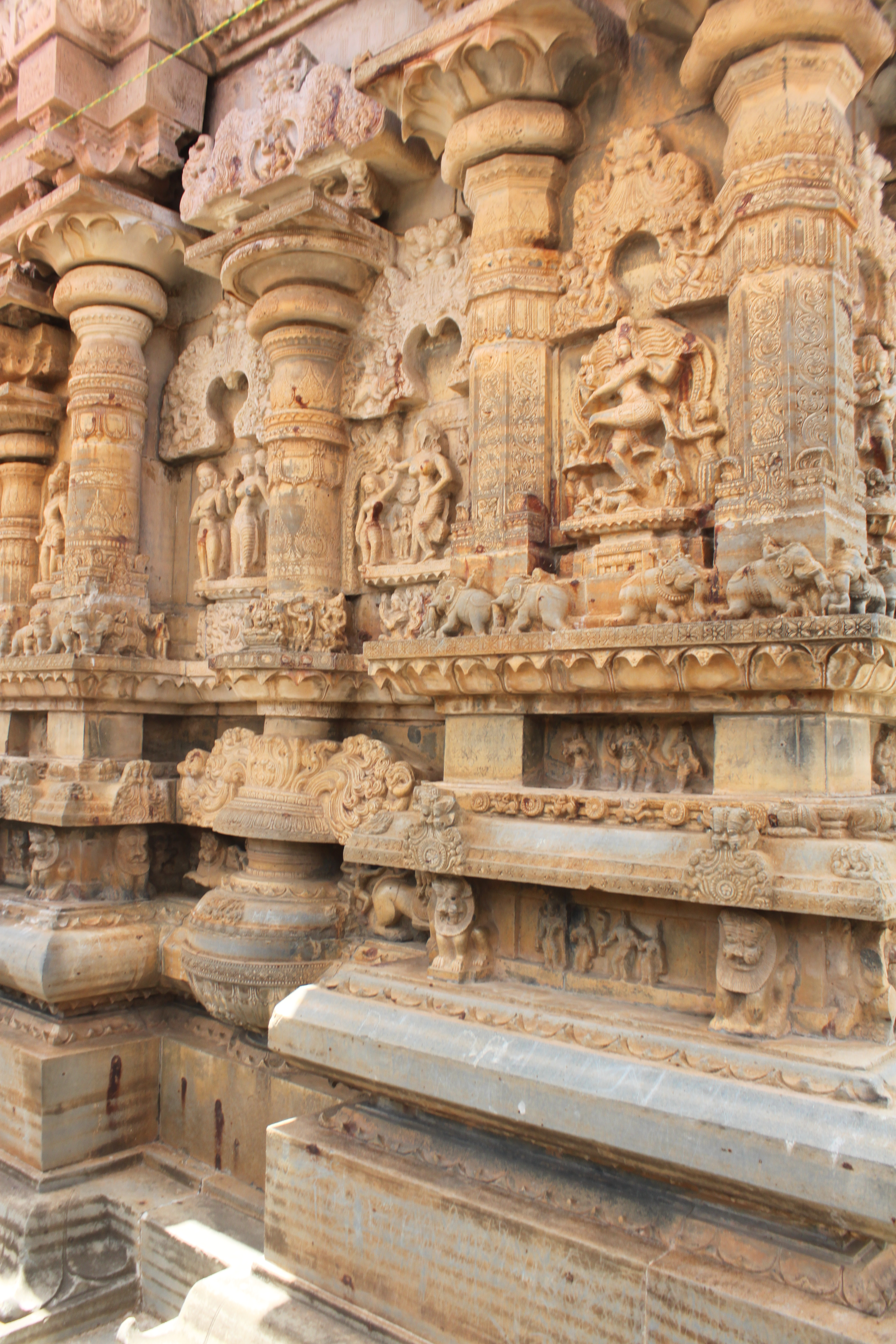
Shaivaite sculptures on the walls

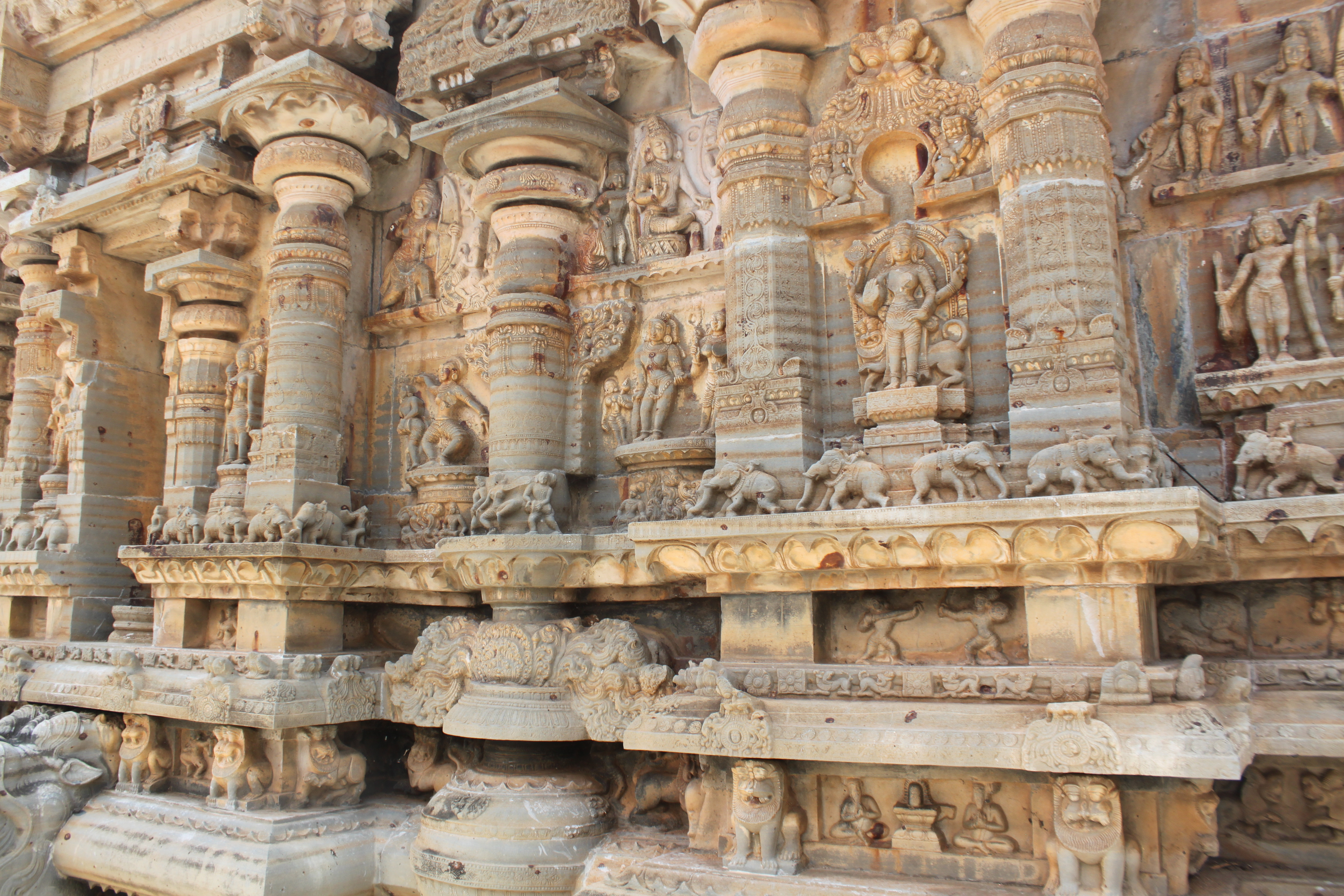
Carvings on the Chennakesava Temple

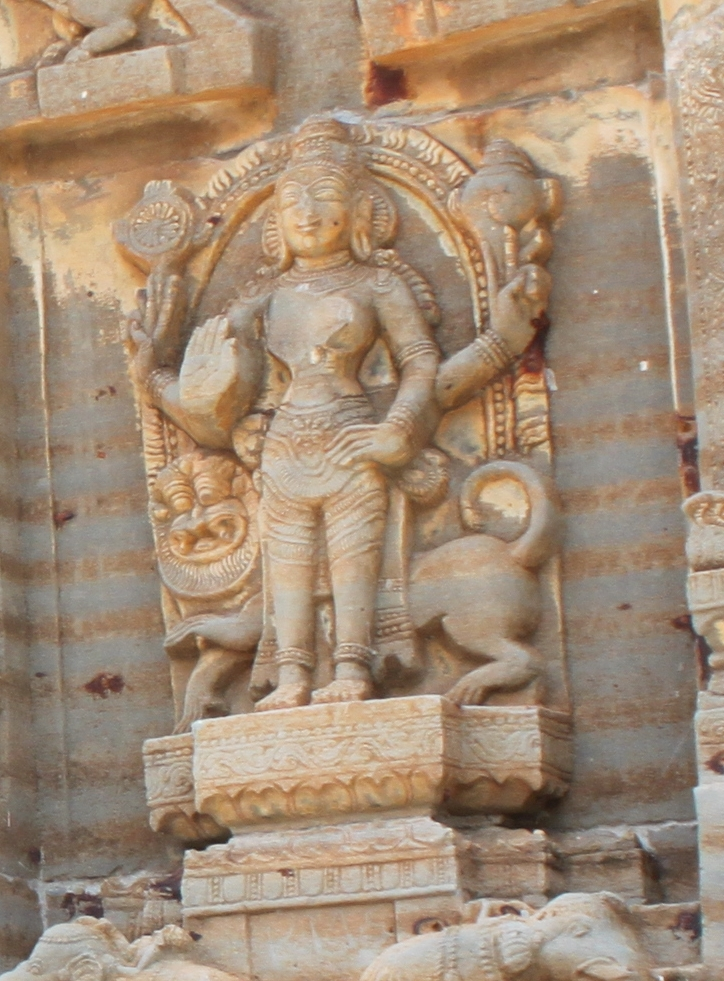
Vishnu Durga

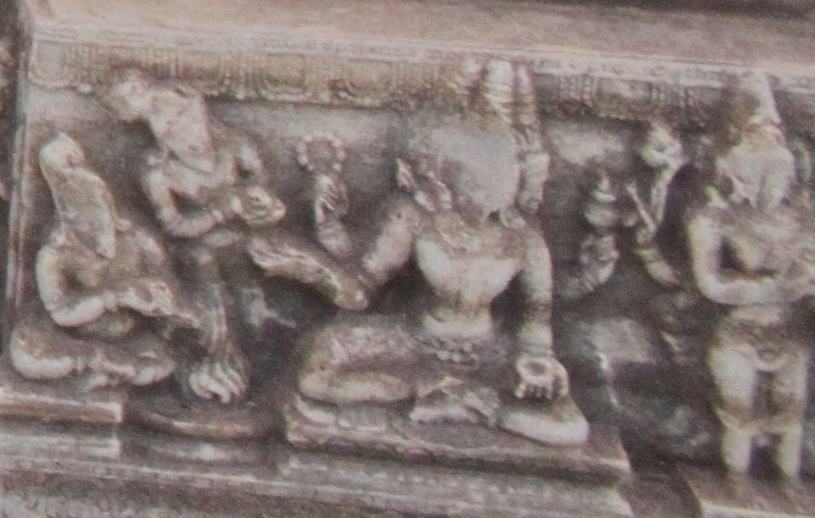
Brahma with sages, Pushpagiri

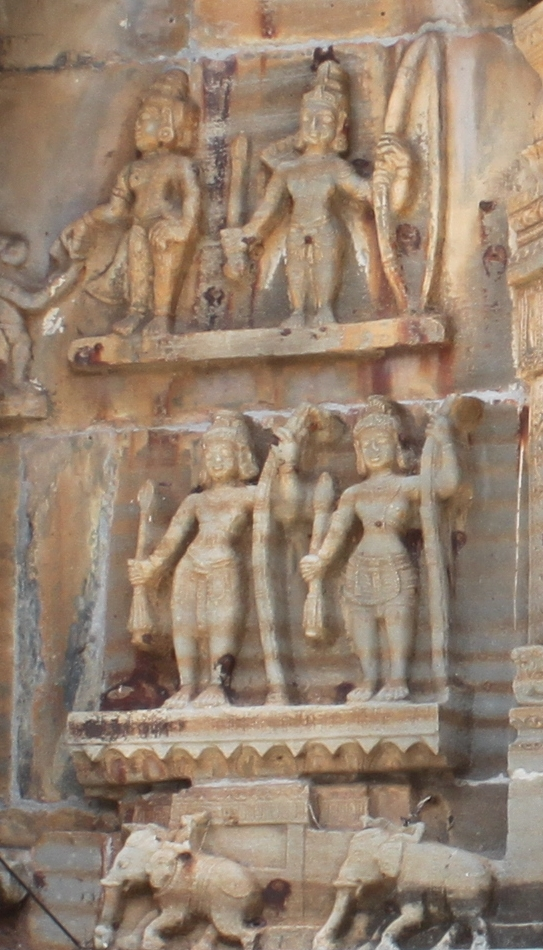
Ramayanam Scenes, Pushpagiri

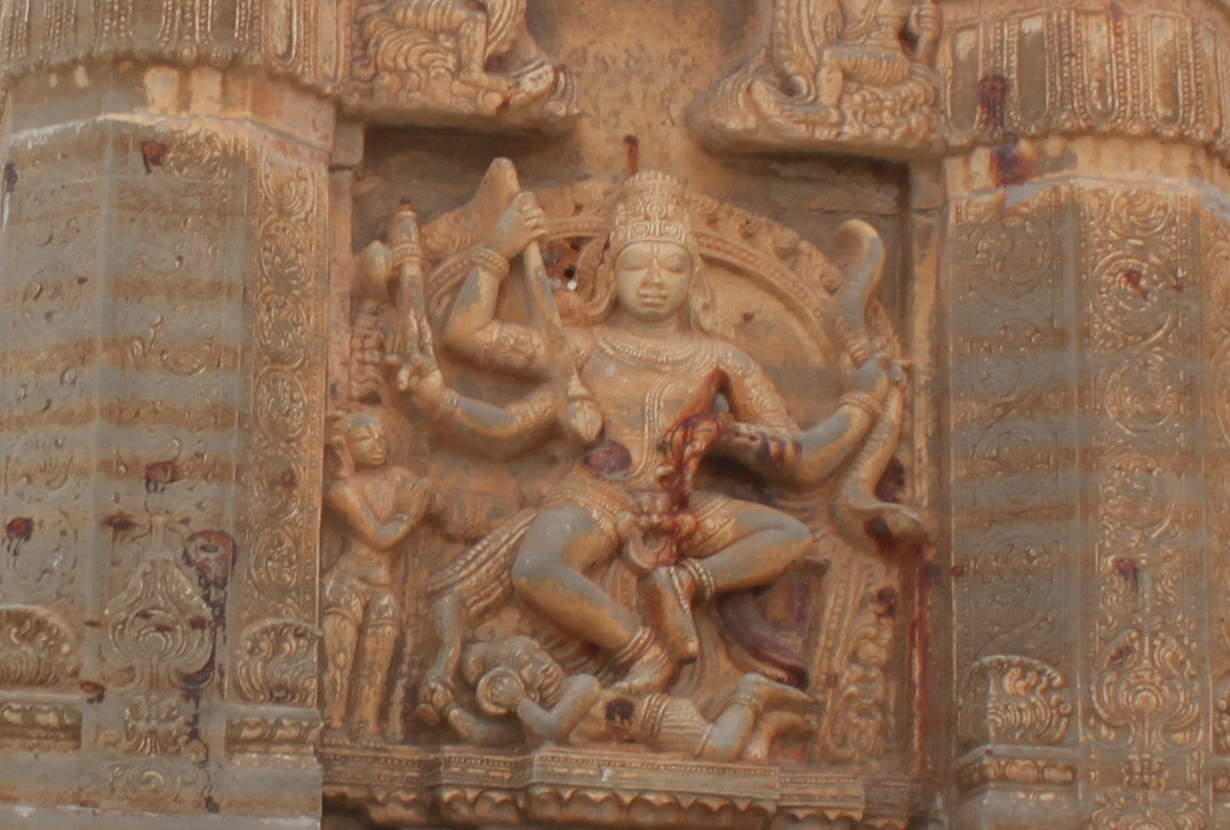
Mahishasura Mardhini, Pushpagiri

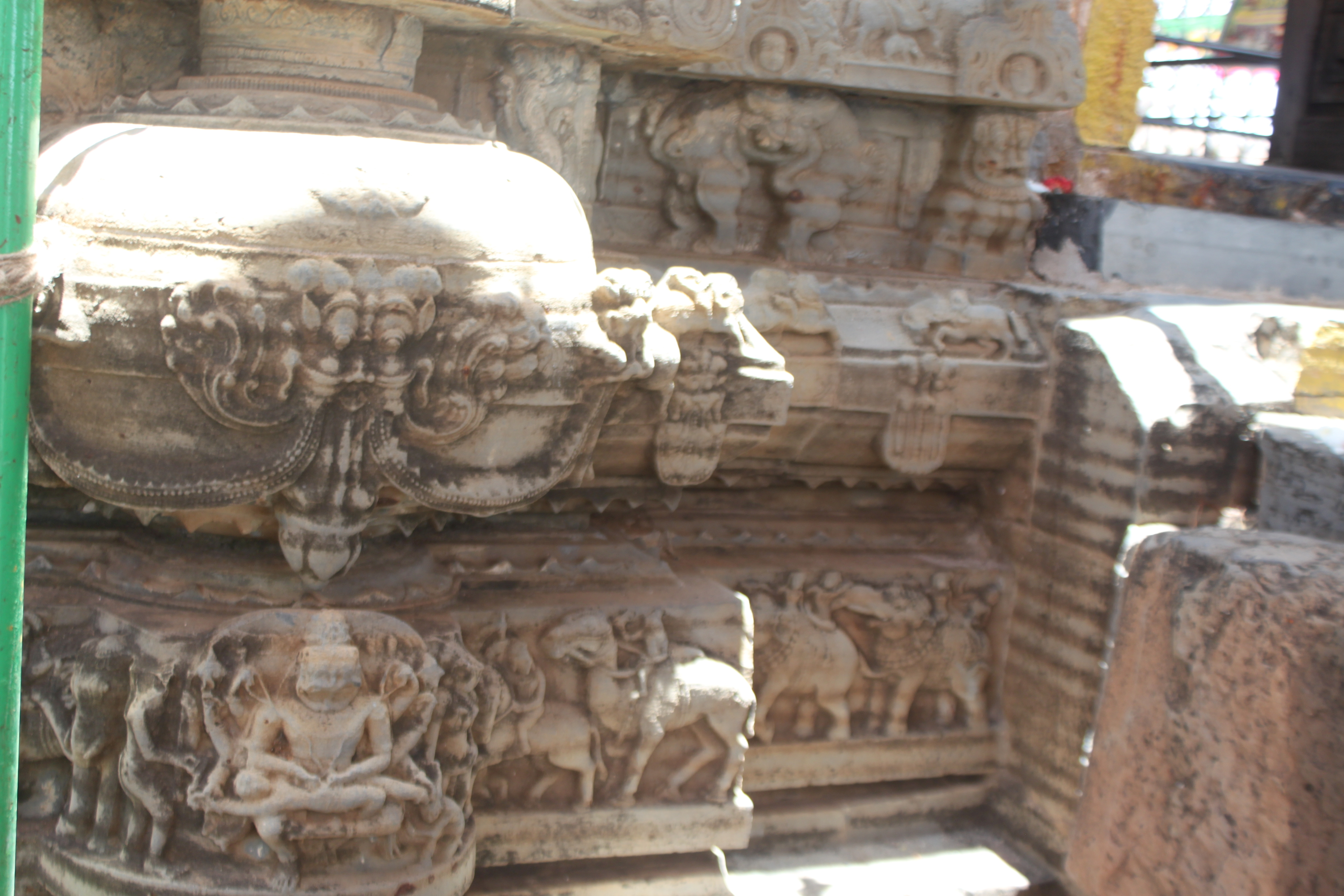
Ugra Narasimha and a Mameluke, Chennakesava temple, Pushpagiri

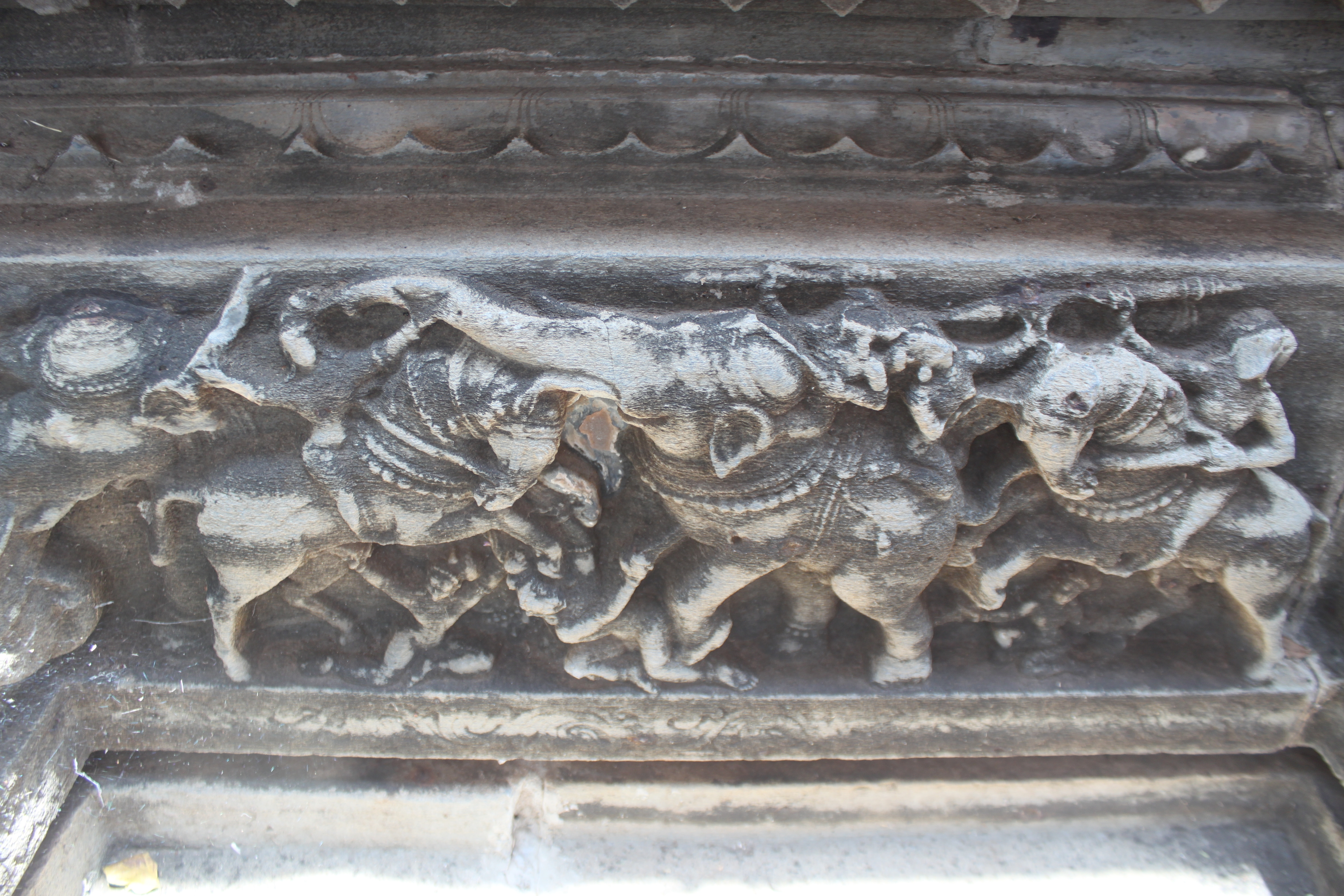
Battle scene showing horses and elephants, Pushpagiri

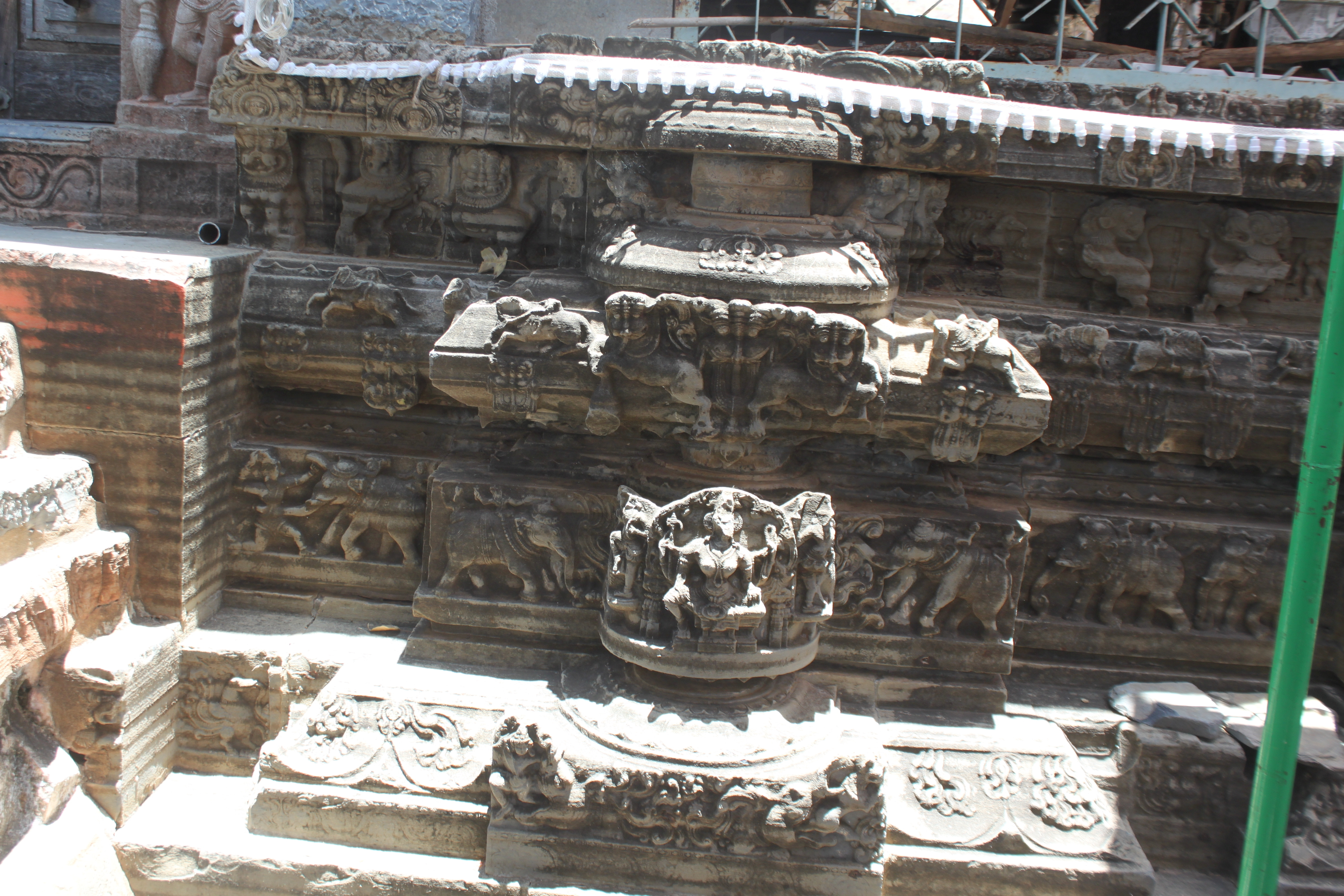
Adi Varaha Murthy along with Elephants, Pushpagiri

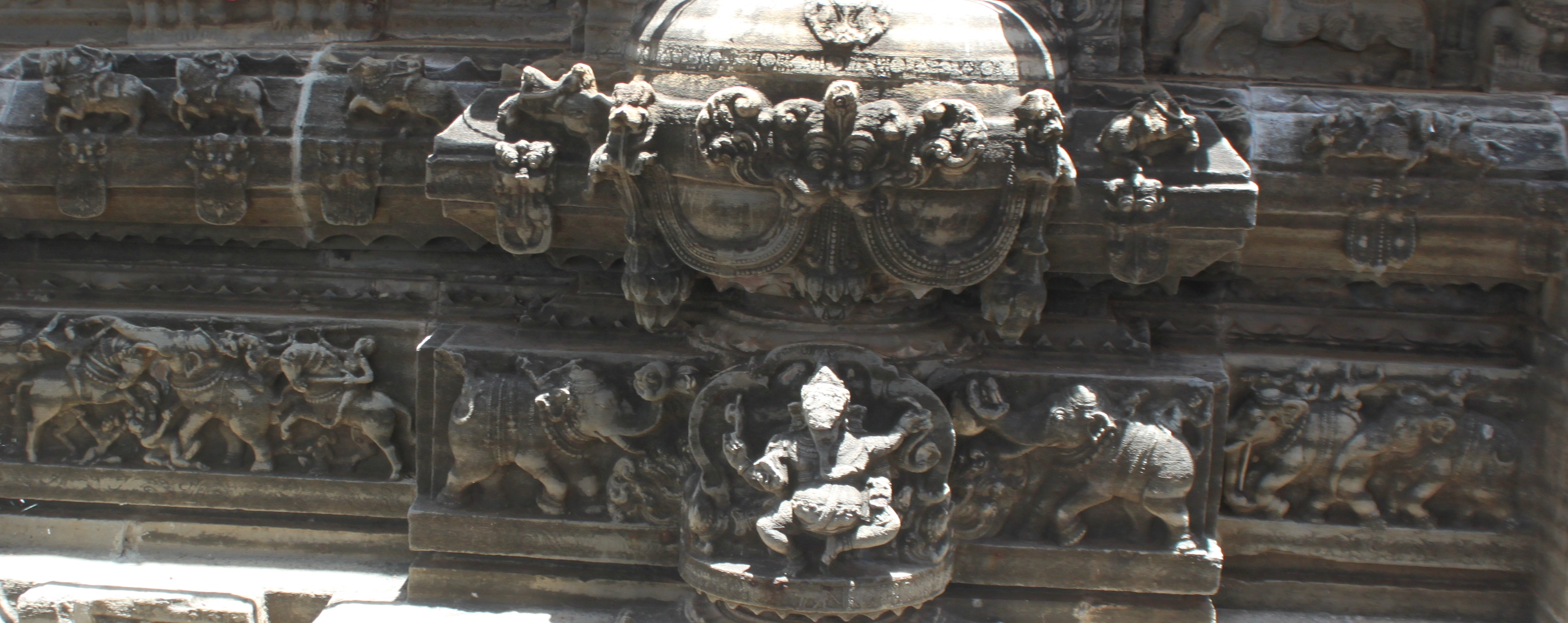
Natya Ganapati along with a herd of elephants, Pushpagiri

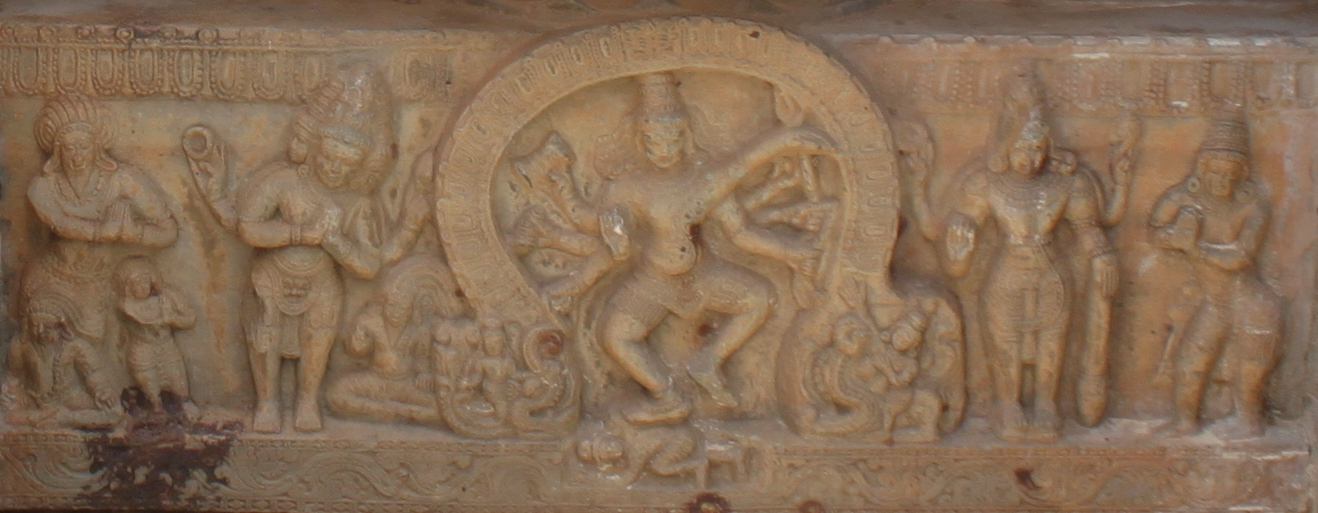
Nataraja Murthy worshipped by Brahma, Vishnu and Sages, Pushpagiri

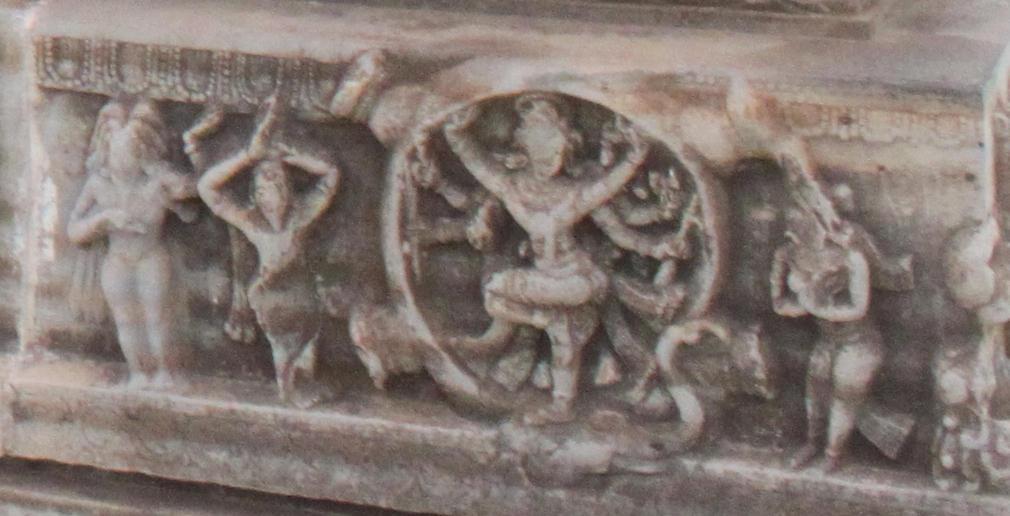
Gajasura Samhara Murthy (Shiva) being worshipped, Pushpagiri

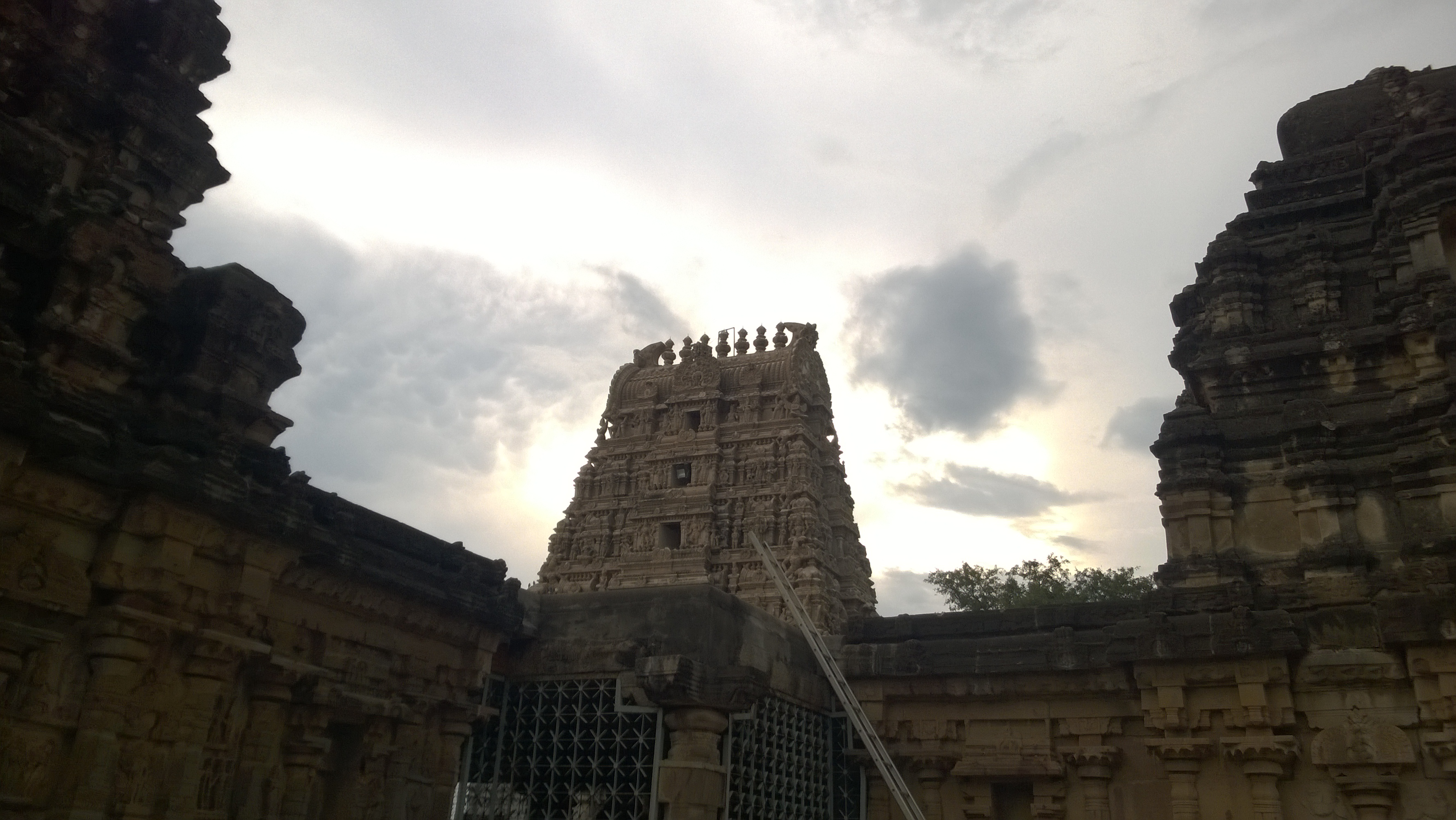
Chennakesava Swamy Temple, Pushpaigiri

Apart from the Indranatha Swamy, Vaidyanatheswara Swamy and Chennakesava Swamy temples, the Pushpagiri temple complex also has a lot of temples dedicated to Bhimeswara, Hachaleswara, Pallaveswara, Sambeswara, Kamala Sambeswara, Kashi Vishwanatha and more.

== Styles of worship ==
Predominantly a Shaivite place, Pushpagiri also has numerous temples dedicated to various Vaishnava deities. Apart from the ubiquitous Shaiva and Vaishnava styles, there are various other styles of worship have existed here like Jainism, Buddhism, Golaki, Aaradhya, Kapalika, Kalamukha, Rasasaivam, Shakteya and Soura.

== List of temples in the complex ==
Pushpagiri contains a lot of temples of which 28 are still extant which could be dated in between 10th and 13t^{h} Century CE. This list in not comprehensive and enumerates only the major temples in the area:

- Śrī Lakśmī Chennakeśava Swamy temple (Also called Śrī Śiva Keśava Swamy temple)
- Śrī Kāmākśi Vaidyanātheswara Swamy temple
- Śrī Santāna Malleśwara Swamy temple
- Śrī Trikūteshwara Swamy temple
- Śrī Indrānātha Swamy temple
- Śrī Kaśi Viśālākśi Viśwanātha Swamy temple
- Śrī Sākśi Malleśwara Swamy temple
- Śrī Agasthyeśwara Swamy temple
- Śrī Pāthāla Ganapathi temple

Apart from the above well known and documented temples, there are multiple sanctums that dot the landscape. Across the mound that abuts the river, there are tens of abandoned shrines that once used to house a Linga and a Nandi which is evident from the vacated pedestals.

== See also ==
- Lakulisa
- Vamachara
- Chola Art
- Cuddapah
- Adi Shankara
- Advaita
