= Henry Briggs =

Henry Briggs may refer to:

- Henry Briggs (mathematician) (1561–1630), English mathematician
- Henry Perronet Briggs (1793–1844), English painter
- Henry George Briggs (1824–1872), English merchant, traveller, and orientalist
- Henry Shaw Briggs (1824–1887), Union Army general in the American Civil War
- Sir Henry Briggs (politician) (1844–1919), Australian politician
- Henry Briggs (footballer) (1871–1913), English footballer
- H. W. Briggs (1819–1904), American judge, postmaster, and politician

== See also ==
- Harry Briggs (disambiguation)
