= Commercial Bank of India =

- Native name: Commercial Bank of India
- Founded: 1845; 181 years ago)
- Defunct: 1866; 160 years ago
- Headquarters: Bombay, British India
- Number of locations: 10
- Products: Banking

The Commercial Bank of India, also known as Exchange Bank, was a bank which was established in Bombay Presidency (now Mumbai), in 1845 of the British Raj period. The bank failed in the crash of 1866, after successfully operating for 20 years. The bank had eight branches, exclusive of the head office at Bombay, viz: London, Calcutta, Hong Kong, Fuzhou, Shanghai, Hankou (now part of Wuhan), Yokohama and Singapore, with an agency for the purchase of bullion at San Francisco. Commercial Bank of India was then wound up as directed by the Master of the Rolls, under the corresponding section of the Companies Act of England, where the company was registered under the Indian law and was not registered in England, but was carrying on business in England.

== See also ==
- History of Mumbai
- Banking in India
