= Harold Briggs =

Harold Briggs may refer to:

- Harold Briggs (RAF officer) (1877–1944), senior Royal Navy and Royal Air Force officer
- Harold Rawdon Briggs (1894–1952), Director of Operations for the British Army in Malaya 1950–1951
- Harold Briggs (politician) (1870–1945), British Conservative Member of Parliament

== See also ==
- Harry Briggs (disambiguation)
