= Nagardev =

Nagardev was the son-in-law of Raja Bhimdev and brother-in-law of Pratapbimba. He ruled the islands of Mumbai from 1331 to 1347 or 1348. In 1347, Nika Malik, a General of the Delhi Sultanate made a three pronged attack on Thana, Mahim, and Rarjapore near Marol. He lost his life while defending his capital. His queen continued to fight but she too. was slain. Nagardev was defeated by the Muslim rulers and the islands came under their control, thus ending the sovereignty of Hindu rulers over the islands of Bombay.
