= João Pirez =

Portuguese nobleman

João Pirez was a Portuguese nobleman. The Island of Pory (Elephanta Island) in Bombay was leased to João Pirez in 1548 by viceroy João de Castro. The rent to be paid was 105 pardaos.
