= Harry Briggs =

Harry Briggs may refer to:

- Harry Briggs (footballer, born 1923) (1923–2005), English football centre half
- Harry Briggs (footballer, born 1904) (1904–?), English football winger
- Harry Briggs Jr., plaintiff in Briggs v. Elliott, a challenge to school segregation in Summerton, South Carolina

== See also ==
- Henry Briggs (disambiguation)
- Harold Briggs (disambiguation)
