= Henry George Briggs =

English merchant, traveller, and orientalist

- Born: 20 October 1824; Bombay, India
- Died: 4 July 1872 (aged 47); Bombay, India
- Occupations: merchant, traveller, orientalist
- Notable work: see list
- Father: Henry Briggs

Henry George Briggs (1824–1872) was an English merchant, traveller, and orientalist.

== Life ==
Henry George Briggs, son of Henry Briggs, was born in Bombay on 20 October 1824. He travelled in South Africa in 1843; in China in 1845; and settled in Bombay in 1846, in the office of Briggs & Co. He served in the Bombay Secretariat. He went to Karachi: edited, in 1854, the Sindian, and, in 1855, the Sind Kossid, both long since defunct. He became, in 1856, Assistant Secretary at Bombay to the Great Indian Peninsula Railway. He was Secretary to the Bombay Municipality, 1860–1862. He was a merchant and agent at Bombay and Hingolee in 1863. His firm failed in the share mania of 1865; he travelled in Gujarat, and settled in Calcutta, entering the Public Works Department there. In May 1872, he went again to Bombay; he died there on 4 July 1872.

== Works ==
- Cities of Gujdrashtra (1849), a book of travel in Gujarat, containing curious information gleaned from travellers in India: of whose rare works he made an extensive collection.
- The Parsis or Modern Zardushtians (1852), a work which had been superseded by 1906.
- The Nizam, His History and Relations with the British Government (1861), a valuable work containing special information.
