= Princess Dock =

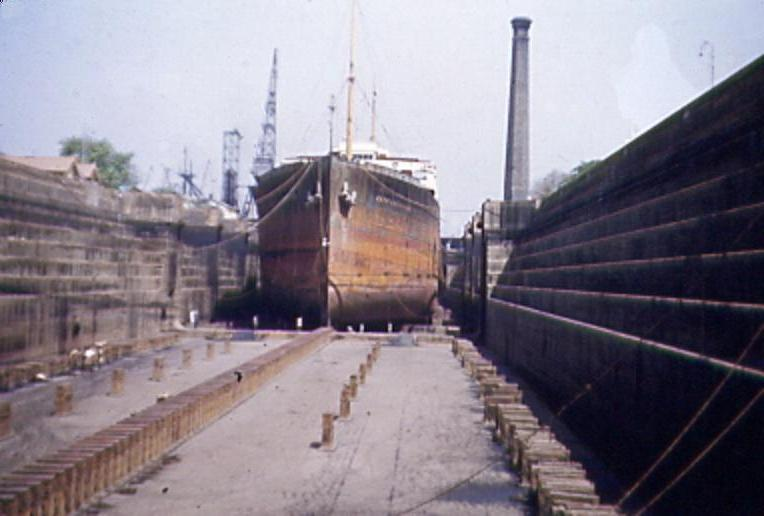
The Dry Dock at Princess Docks

The Princess (Prince's) Dock was built in 1885 in Bombay as part of the scheme for improving the whole foreshore of the Bombay Harbour. The actual name of the place is Prince's Dock that has been corrupted over the years to Princess Dock. Its cost was approximated at a million sterlings. The Elephanta Islands can be seen 3–4 mi (4.8–6.4 km) off this dock eastwards.
