= Malik-us-Sharq =

Malik-us-Sharq was the Governor of Mahim, a village in Mumbai, India when the city was under the Gujarat Sultanate. He was appointed governor during the reign of Ahmad Shah I (1411–1443) of the Gujarat Sultanate. In addition to instituting a pi-oper survey of the land, he did a great deal towards the improvement of the revenue system.
