= Mendham's Point =

Locality in Mumbai, India

Mendham's Point is a locality near the present day Lion Gate at Colaba in Mumbai. Until 1760, the English buried their dead at Mendham's Point. Gerald Aungier, Governor of Bombay, had planned extensive fortifications for Bombay from Dongri in the north to Mendham's Point in the south.
