= Bombay Shipping and Iron Shipping Companies =

Bombay Shipping and Iron Shipping Companies was established in 1863 to make merchants in Mumbai, India (also known as Bombay) independent of the English.

The company was created at a time when the cotton trade was undergoing such a turbulent time, therefore businessmen were looking to banking and stockbroking as a way to make their fortune. The shipping firm was thus bought up by shareholders, and the shares of the company increased in value by 200%.
