= H. W. Briggs =

American politician (1819–1904)

Henry Waterhouse Briggs (August 25, 1819 – January 29, 1904) was an American politician and civic official. Born in Rome, New York, to Michael and Olivia (Waterhouse) Briggs, he worked as a merchant in Troy, Davis County, Iowa, where he also served as postmaster and county judge. He relocated to California in 1859, settling in Santa Clara County, which he represented as member of the 1861 California State Assembly. He was afterwards appointed Register of the Land Office at Visalia, serving for six years, where he also edited the Visalia Delta newspaper. In 1868 he relocated to Gilroy, where he worked as a merchant and held the position of postmaster for sixteen years. In 1887 he relocated to Pacific Grove, where he worked in real estate, dying at his home there at the age of 85.
