= Kutb Khan =

Indian commandant

Kutb Khan was the commandant of Mahim, a village in Mumbai, India during the 15th century when the city was under the Gujarat Sultanate.
