= Siddi Sambal =

Siddi Sambal was a Siddi naval officer who fought for the Mughal Empire. On 10 October 1673, he and his fleet entered Bombay without permission from the English East India Company (EIC) and attacked merchant shipping in the Pen and Nagothan Rivers, disrupting the activities of both the EIC and Maratha king Shivaji.

In 1679, Sivaji landed forces on the island of Khanderi; this then led to an alliance of sorts between the EIC and Sambal. The Sidi, as Mughal admiral, joined the English with a strong fleet; but the English commander found that the Sidi did not mean to give up the island if he took it. The English therefore held back while the Sidi continued to batter Khanderi and then suddenly fortified Underi.

Daulat Khan, Sivaji's admiral, tried to stop this, but he was defeated and severely wounded. His small open boats being unable to stand against the Sidi's stronger and larger vessels. For several years after this, there were constant struggles between the Sidi and the Marathas for the possession of these islands.

== Sources ==
- An African Indian Community in Hyderabad by Ababu Minda Yimene, p. 94
