= Rai Qutb =

Rai Qutb was an officer of the Gujarat Sultanate who had conquered Mahim, a village in Mumbai, India. During the early 15th century, the Bhandaris seized the island of Mahim from the Sultanate and ruled it for eight years. It was reconquered by Rai Qutb of the Gujarat Sultanate. He died in 1429–1430.

It is related that the daughter of the Rai of Mahim was given in marriage to Prince Fateh Khan, the son of Ahmad Shah of Gujarat.
