= Pratapbimba =

King of ancient Mumbai

Pratapbimba was the son of Raja Bhimdev and he ruled the islands of Mumbai from 1303 to 1331. After Bhimdev's death in 1303, he was succeeded by his son Pratapbimba, who built his capital at Marol in Salsette, which he named Pratappur. The islands were wrested from Pratapbimba's control by Mubarak Khan, a self-proclaimed regent of the Khilji dynasty, who occupied Mahim and Salsette in 1318. It was later reconquered by Pratapbimba, which he ruled till 1331.
