= Elephanta Island =

Island of the Mumbai Harbour, India, containing historic caves

Elephanta Island Gharapuri
- Island Neighbourhood
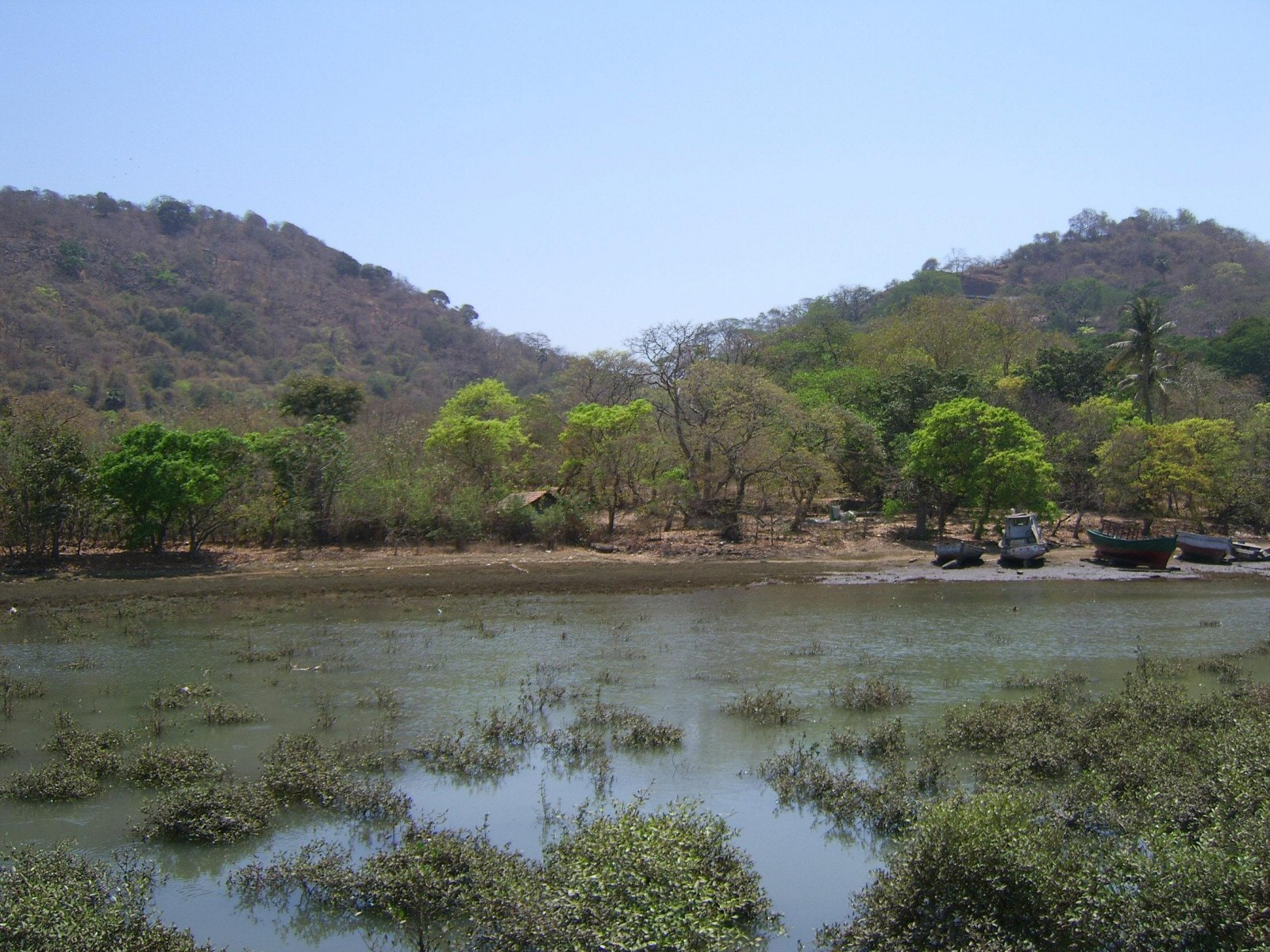
- The island as seen from close to the boat landing

- Location within Mumbai
- Coordinates: 18.96°N 72.935°E
- Country: India
- State: Maharashtra
- District: Raigad
- Metro: Mumbai

Languages
  - Official: Marathi
- Time zone: UTC+5:30 (IST)

Elephanta Island, also called Gharapuri (literally "the city of caves") or Pory Island, is one of a number of islands in Mumbai Harbour, east of Mumbai, India.

== Tourist attractions and accessibility ==
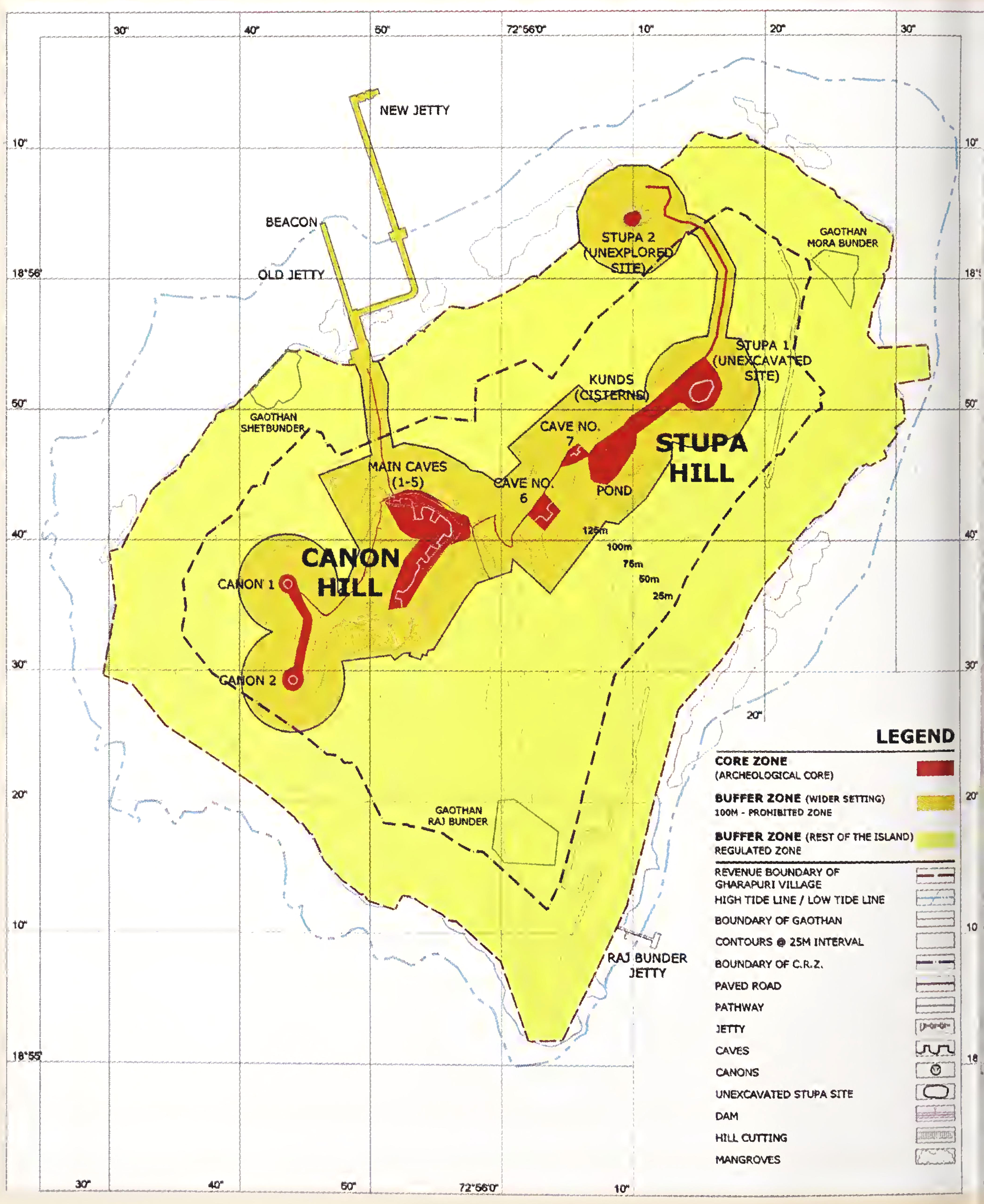
Map of Elephanta Island

This island is a popular tourist destination because of the island's cave temples, the Elephanta Caves, that have been carved out of rock. A recently discovered structure reveals a series of steps leading down to a reservoir. The feature has been identified as a stepped reservoir, characterized by a wide staircase constructed with precisely aligned stone blocks, indicating advanced masonry and water management practices.

The island is easily accessible by ferry from Mumbai, being about 10 kilometres (6.2 mi) from the south east coast of the island city. Boats leave daily from the Gateway of India, taking about an hour each way. The tickets for these can be bought at the Gateway itself. The first ferry leaves at 9 am and the last at 2 pm. From the boat landing stage on the island, a walkway leads to steps that go up to the famous caves.

There is also a narrow-gauge toy train from the boat area on the dock to the base of the steps leading up to the caves (about 600 meters). Along the path, hawkers sell souvenirs like necklaces, anklets, showpieces and keychains. There are also stalls to buy food and drinks. Small monkeys play along the sides of the path, occasionally thieving items from the hawkers, trashcans and tourists.

Mumbai Port Trust (MbPT) has plans to connect the island from Haji Bunder, Mumbai via Ropeway. Once built, it will take only 14 minutes to reach the UNESCO World Heritage Site whereas currently ferry takes about an hour.

== Geology ==
Elephanta Island is composed of volcanic rock that was formed during an eruptive sequence of the Deccan Traps volcanic province. Dating of the rocks suggest that they formed during the latest Cretaceous or earliest Paleocene (66 to 65 million years ago). This makes them contemporaneous with many of the other Deccan Traps eruptions elsewhere in India, but slightly older than the volcanic rock underlying adjacent mainland parts of Mumbai, which is dated to 62.5 million years ago. Ankaramite rock found on the island is significantly younger (potentially as much as 6 million years younger) than the other rocks such as tholeiite that comprise it, suggesting that the island was formed by eruptions that may have lasted for nearly 6 million years.

== History ==
Known in ancient times as Gharapuri (or, 'place of caves'), the name Elephanta island, was given by 16th-century Portuguese explorers, after seeing a monolithic basalt sculpture of an elephant found near the entrance. They decided to take it home but ended up dropping it into the sea because their chains were not strong enough. Later, this sculpture was moved to the Victoria Gardens and then the Victoria and Albert Museum (now Dr. Bhau Daji Lad Museum) in Mumbai, by the British. This island was once the capital of a powerful local kingdom. In Manuscript F by Leonardo da Vinci (kept at the Bibliothèque nationale de France) there is a note in which he says "Map of Elephanta in India which Antonello the haberdasher has." It is unclear who this Florentine traveller Antonello might have been.

== Orientation ==
The island has an area of 16 km^{2} (6.2 sq mi). It is located at approximately 18.95°N 72.93°E. The area comes under the jurisdiction of the Raigad district in Maharashtra.

== Agricultural makeup ==
The island is thickly wooded with palm, mango, and tamarind trees.

== Inhabitants ==
It has a population of about 1,200 people. The inhabitants are mainly involved in growing rice, fishing and repairing boats. There are two British-era cannons at the top. Quite recently, a small dam has been built so as to hold rainwater but that part of the island is privately owned and not accessible for tourists.

There are a total of three villages: Shentbandar, Morabandar and Rajbandar, of which Rajbandar is the capital. Caves and stalls can be seen in Shentbandar which is the first village accessed by tourists when they arrive on the island. Morabandar is covered with thick forest. Staying overnight after sunset on the island is not permitted for tourists as they are expected to leave before the departure of the last return ferry. The first return ferry leaves at 12:30 p.m. and the last return ferry leaves at 6:30 p.m. The ferry service is closed in the monsoon season for four months due to torrential rains at the sea.

== Gallery ==
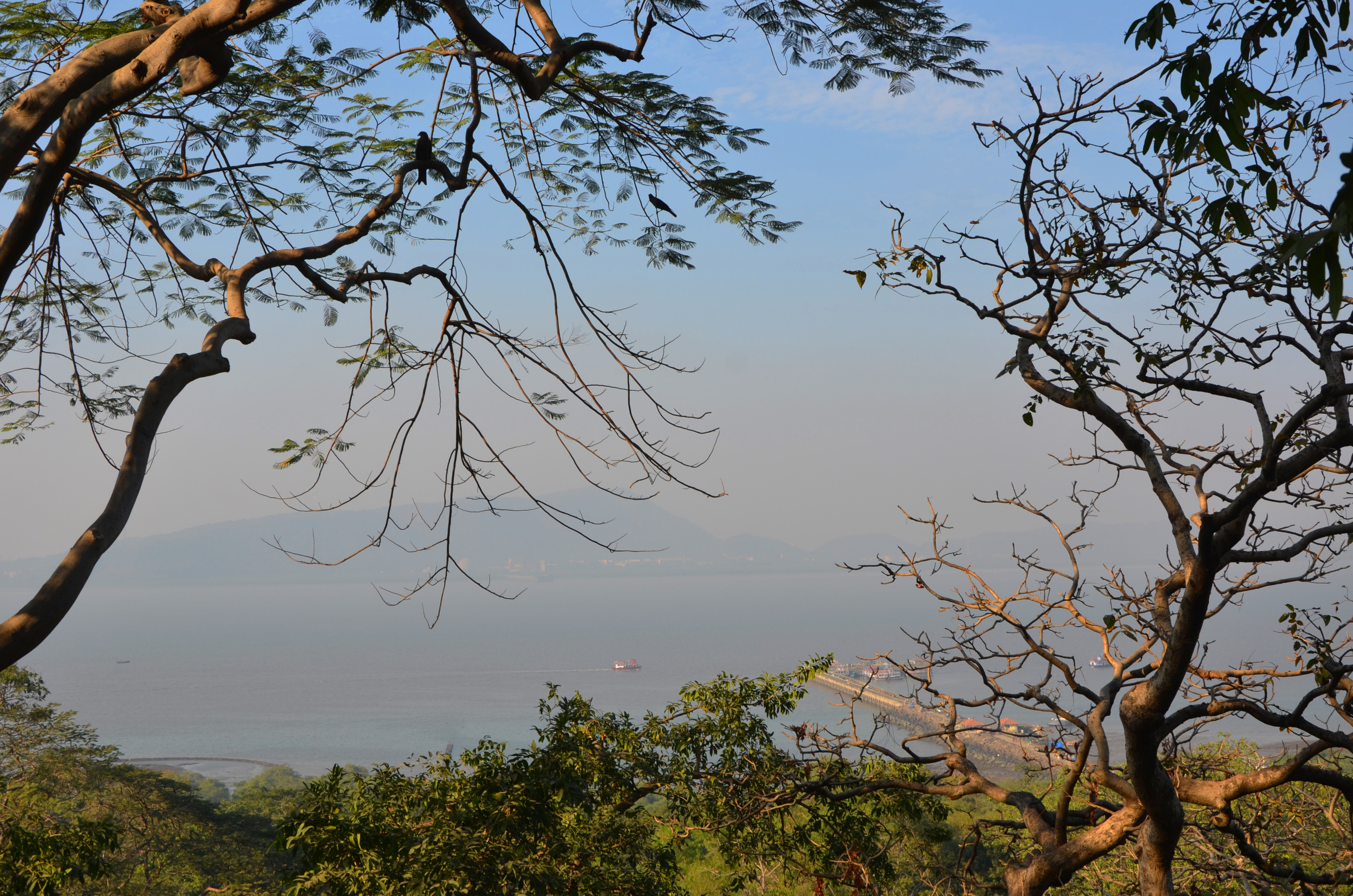
View of Elephanta island jetty, from Elephanta Caves

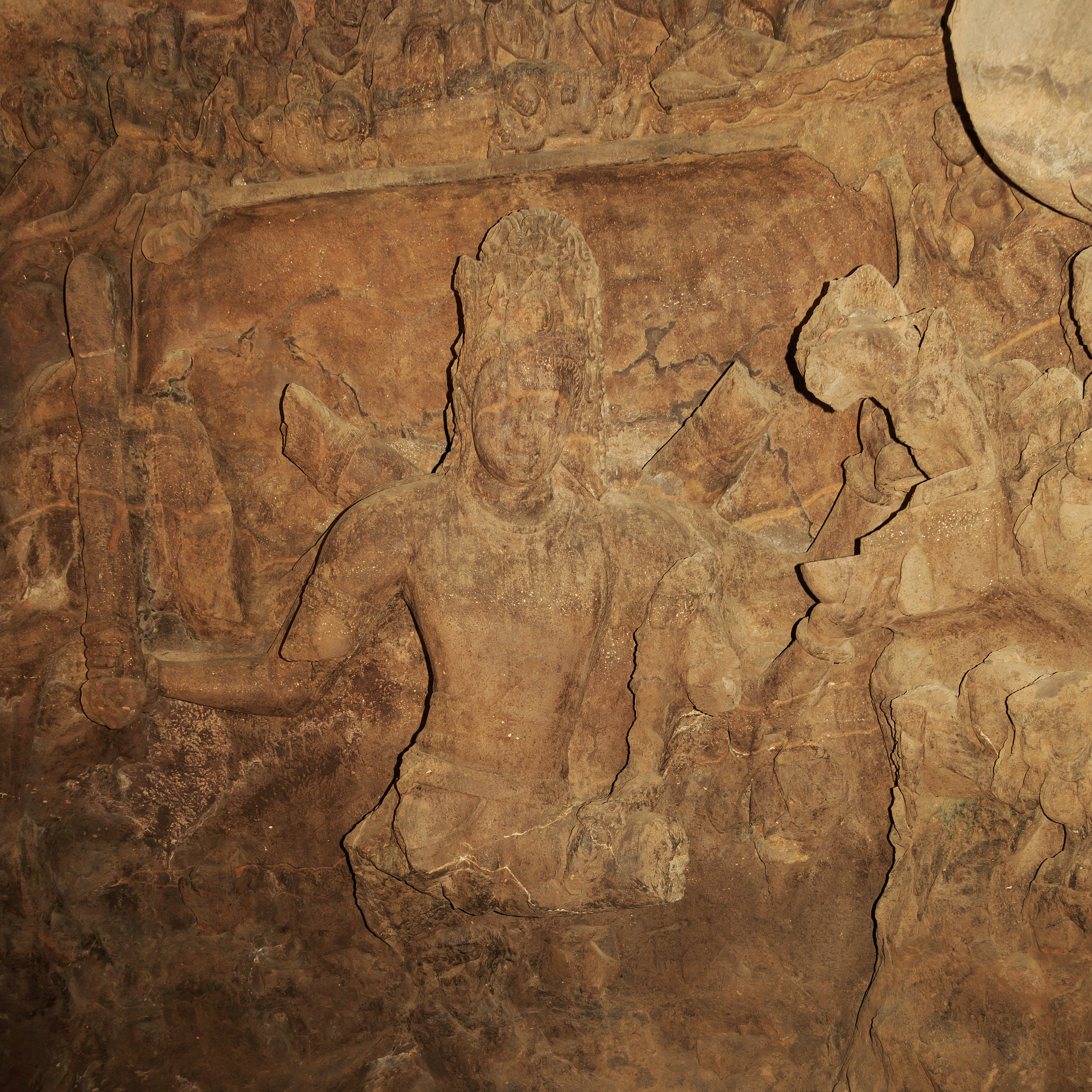
An Elephanta Caves relief

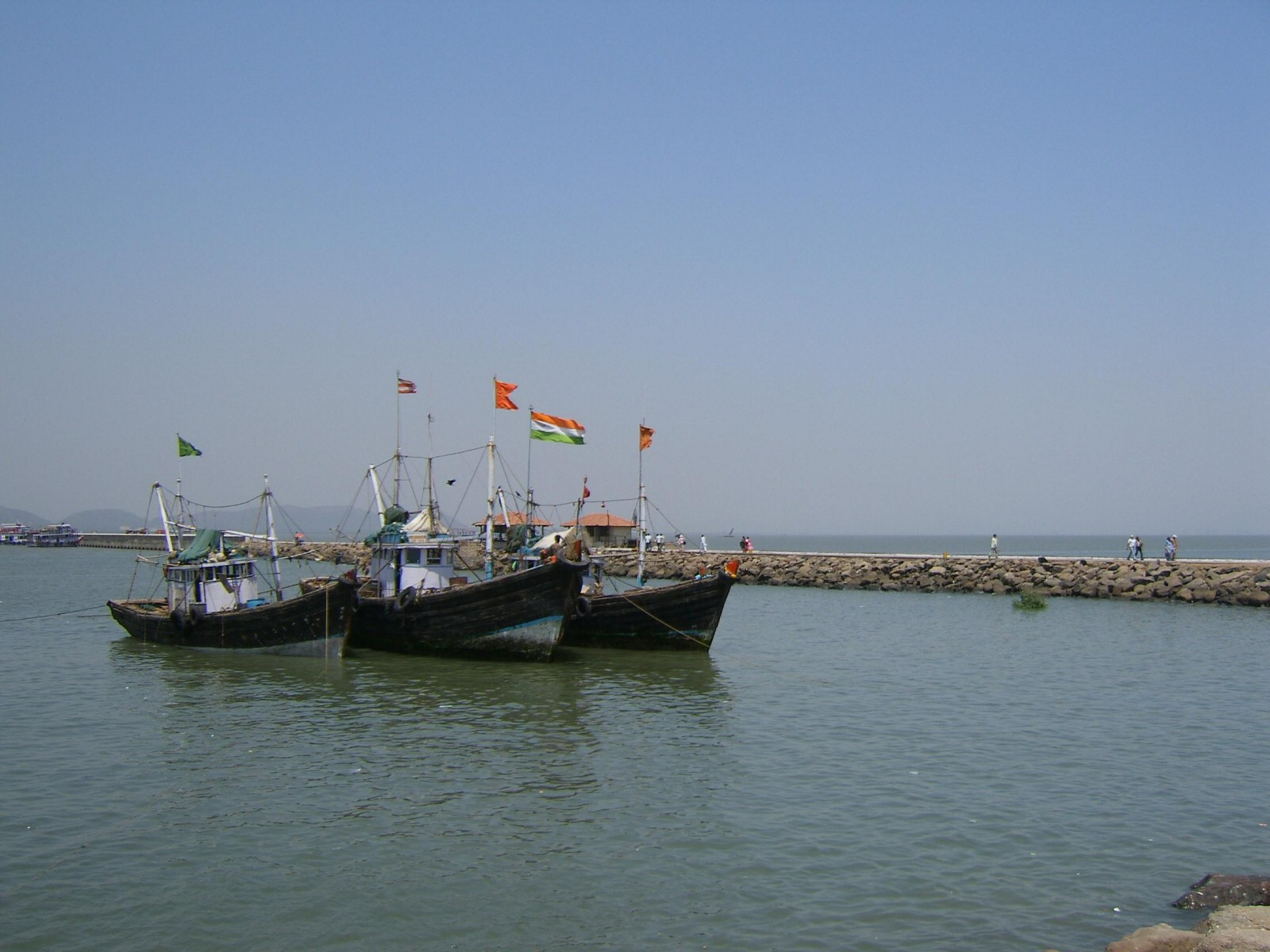
Boats of fishermen living on the island

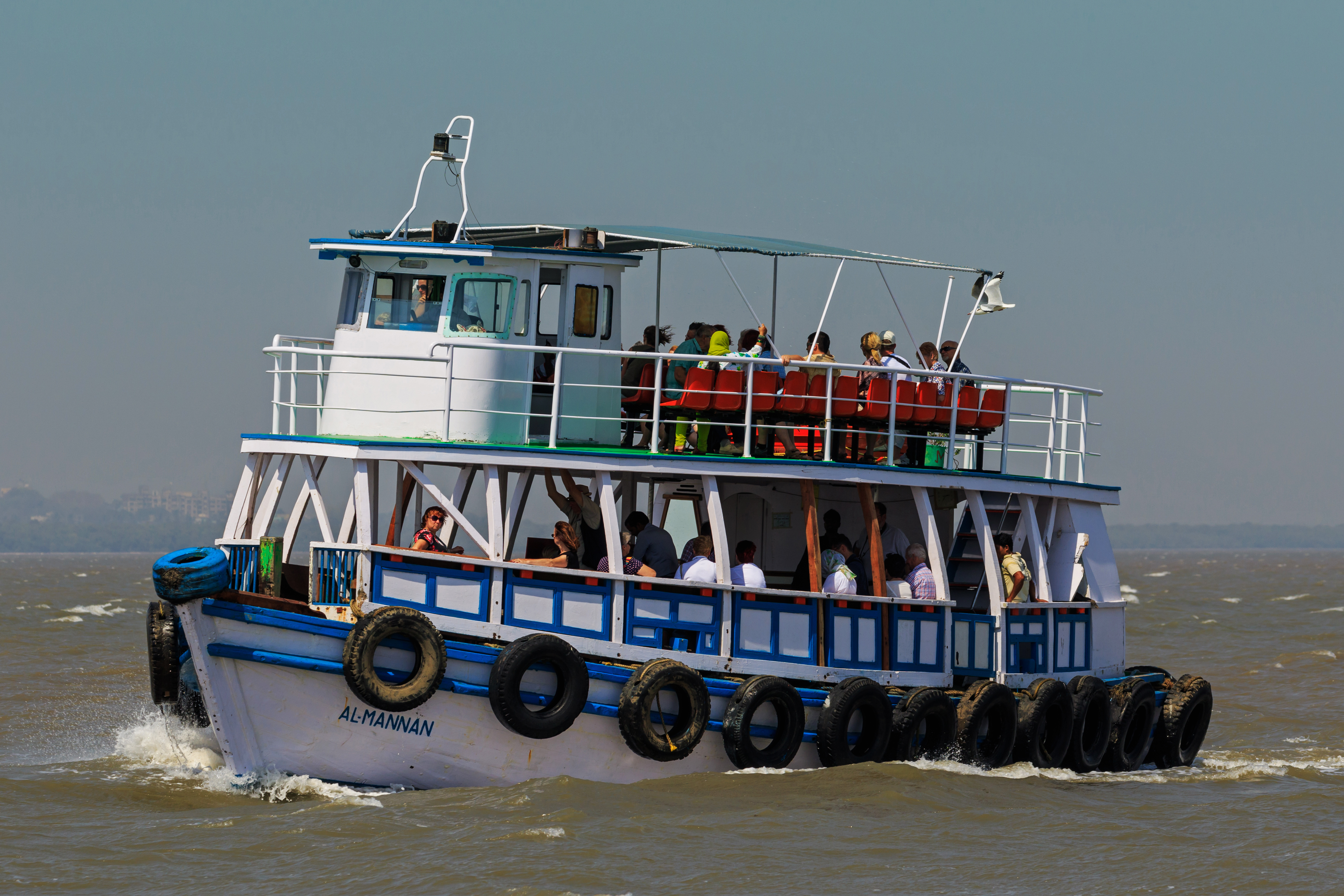
Elephanta-Mumbai ferry

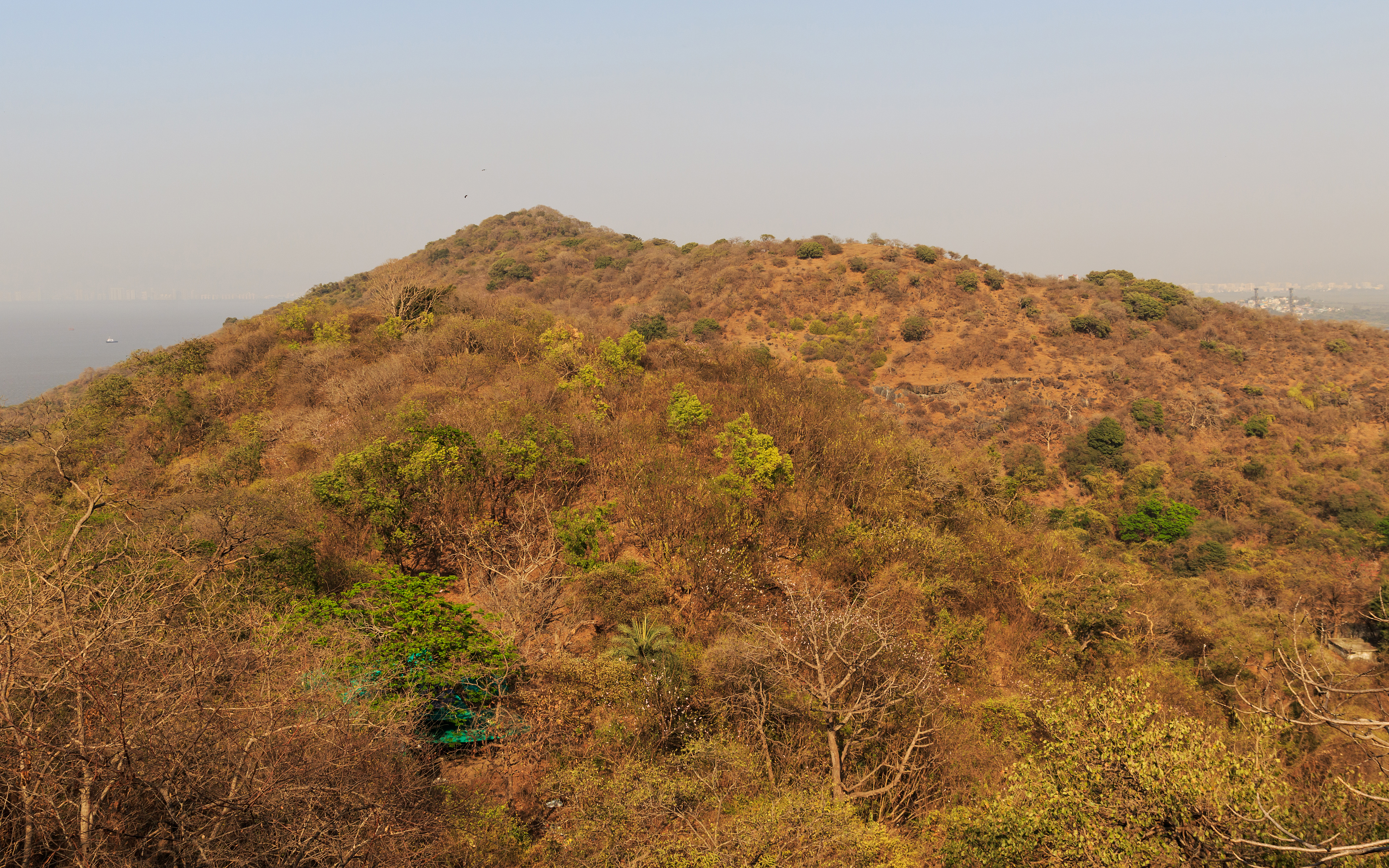
View from Cannon Point

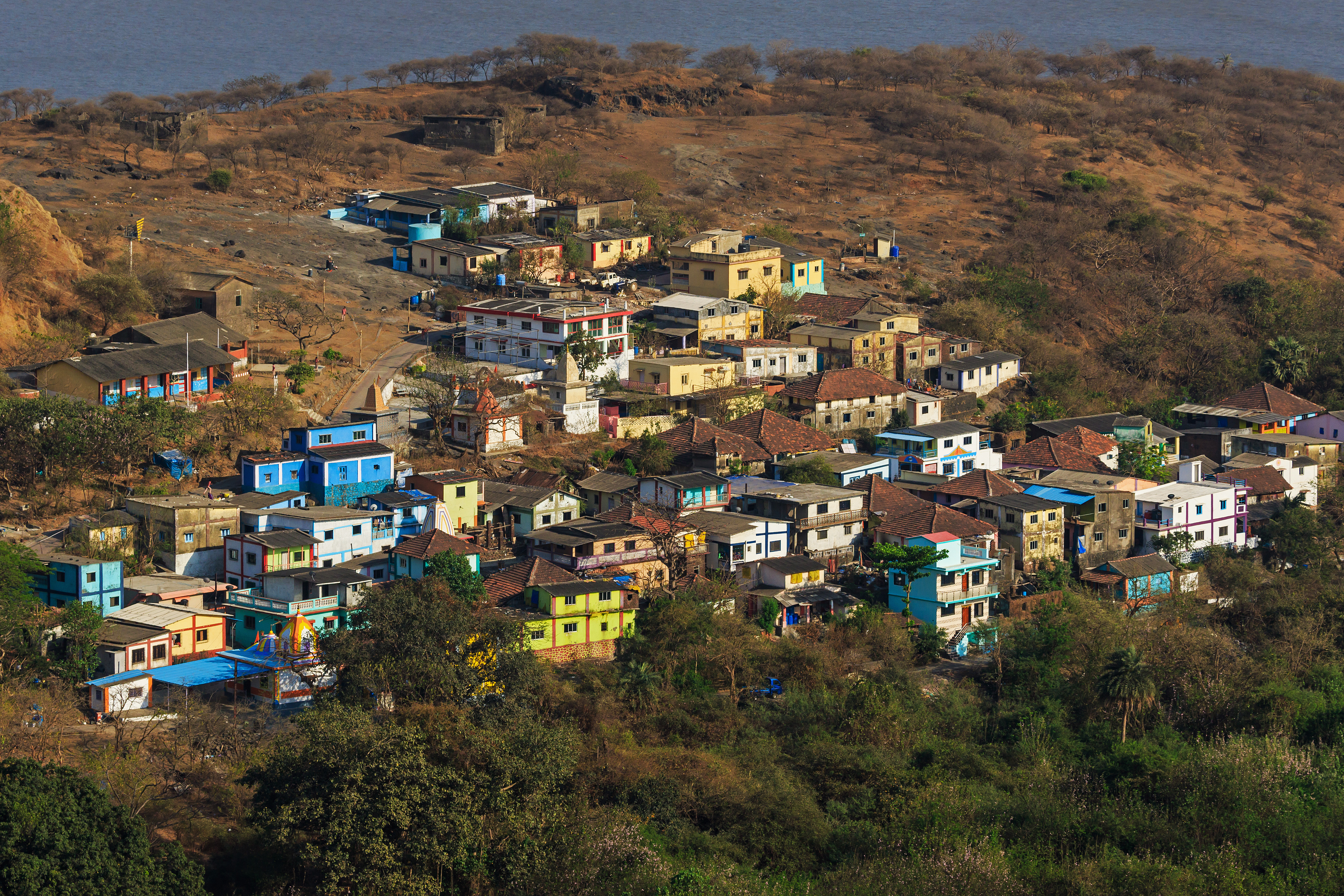
Houses on Elephanta Island

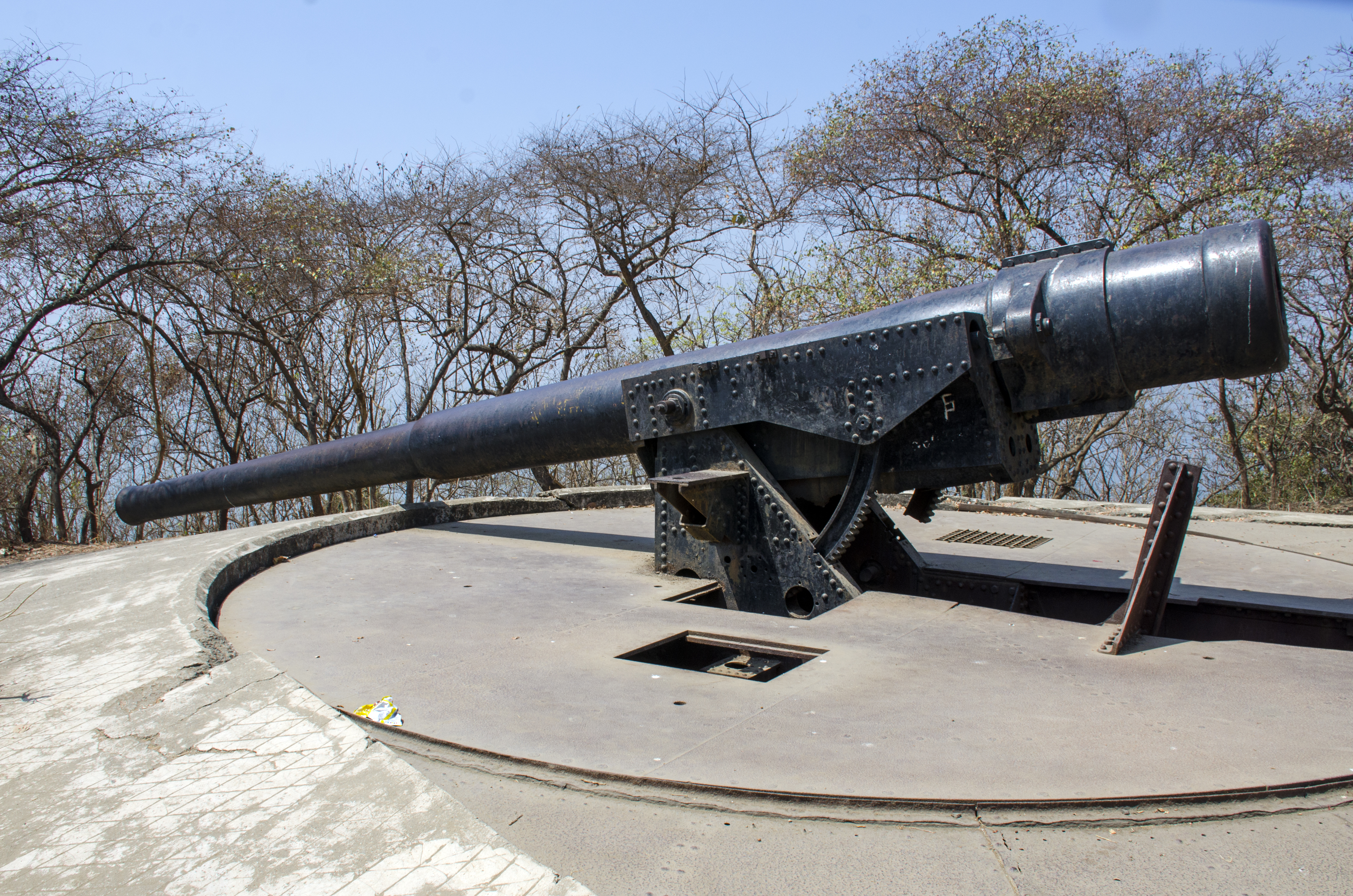
Cannon at Elephanta Island

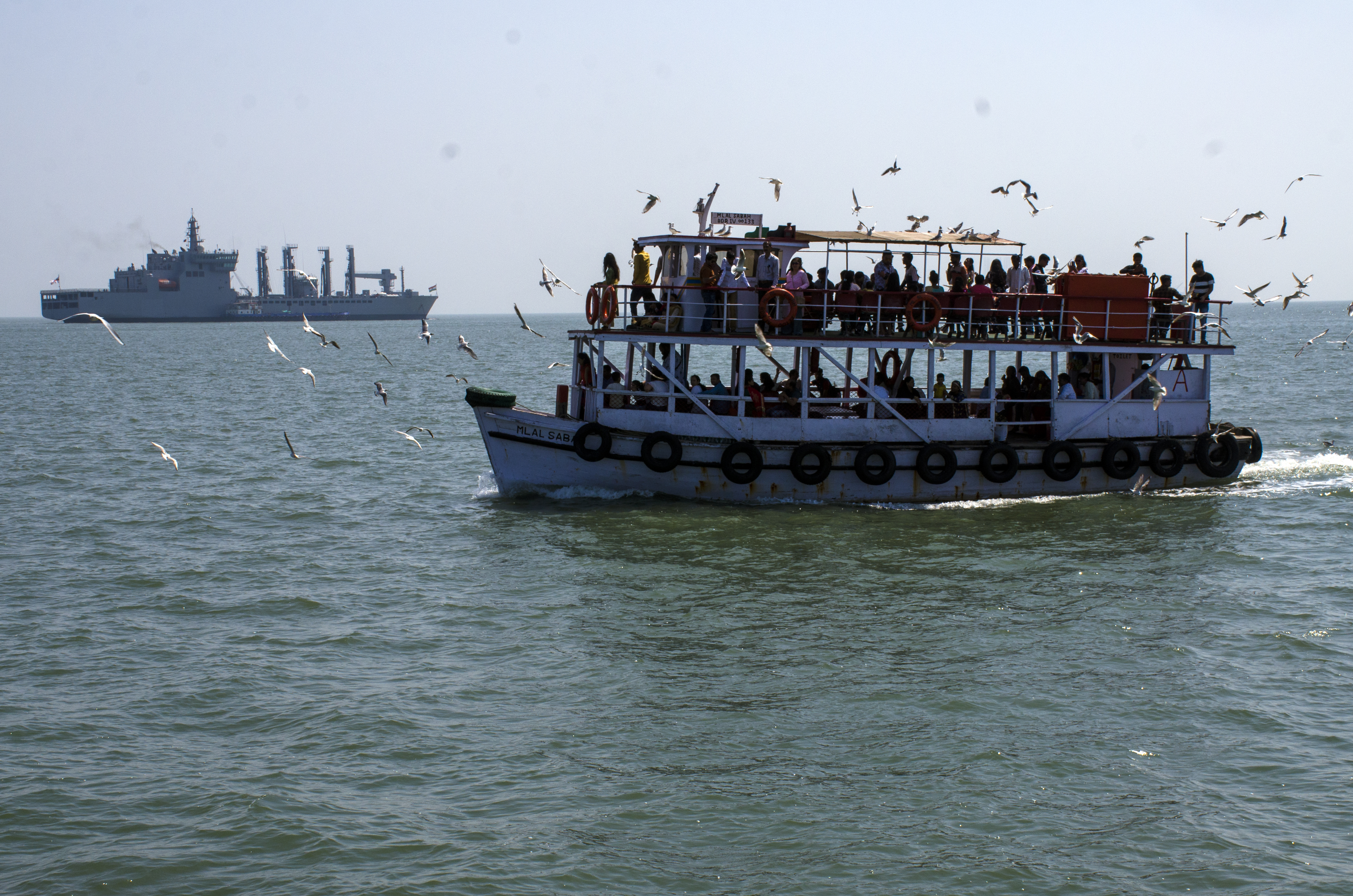
Ferry to Elephanta Island

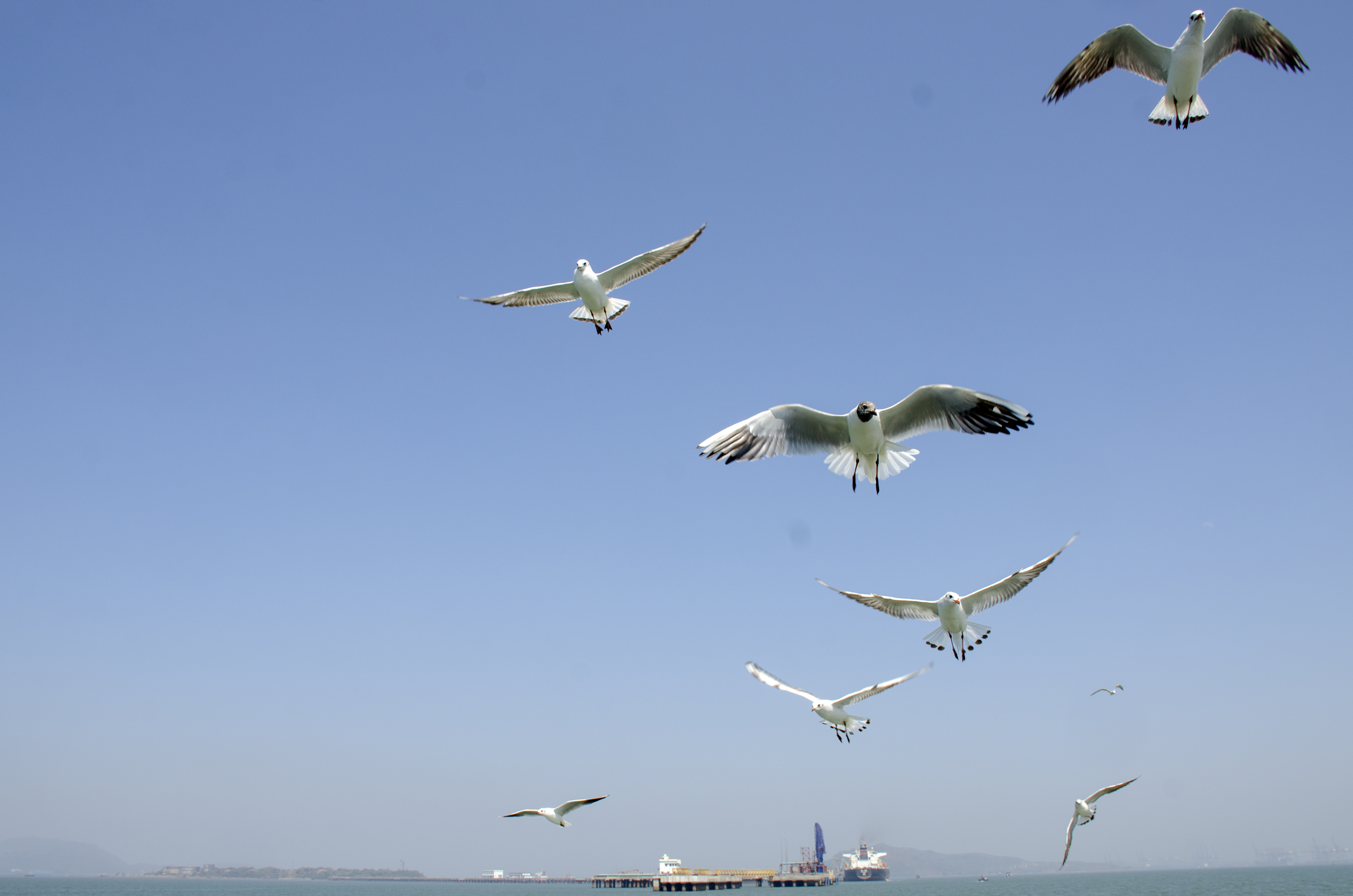
Seagulls seen en route to Elephanta Island

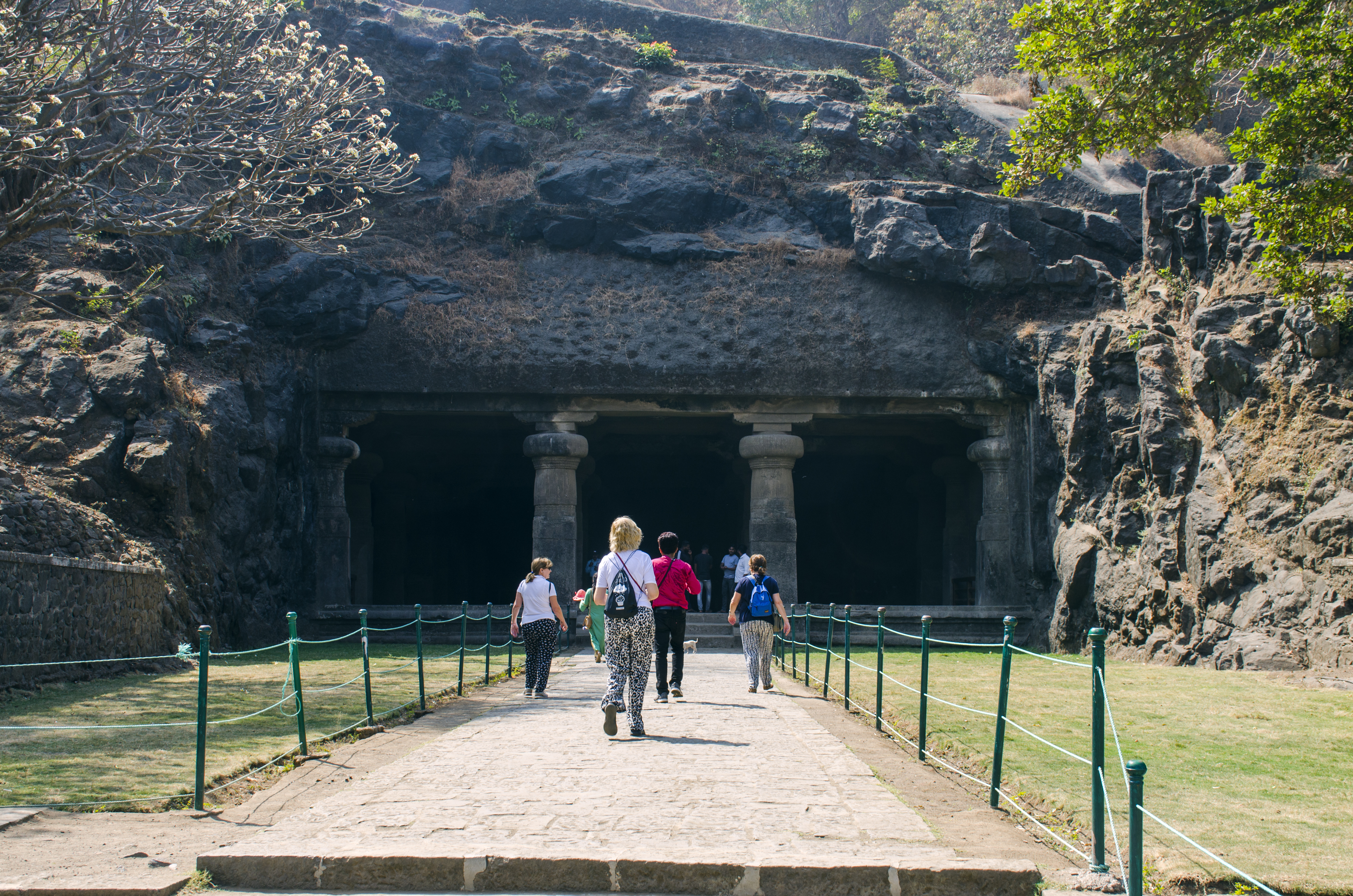
Entrance of Cave 1 of Elephanta Caves
