= Colaba Causeway =

Bhagat Singh Road
- Neighbourhood
- Location in Mumbai, India
- Coordinates: 18.91°N 72.81°E
- Country: India
- State: Maharashtra
- District: Mumbai City
- City: Mumbai
- Zone: 1
- Ward: A

Government
  - Type: Municipal Corporation
  - Body: Brihanmumbai Municipal Corporation (BMC)
- Elevation: 4 m (13 ft)

Languages
  - Official: Marathi
- Time zone: UTC+5:30 (IST)
- PIN: 400 005
- Lok Sabha constituency: Mumbai South
- Vidhan Sabha constituency: Colaba (Vidhan Sabha constituency)
- Civic agency: BMC

Colaba Causeway, officially known as Shahid Bhagat Singh Road, is a commercial street, and a major causeway or land link between Colaba and the Old Woman's Island in the city of Mumbai, India.

It lies close to the Fort area, and to the east of Cuffe Parade, an upmarket neighbourhood in South Mumbai, and close by are Mumbai's famous landmarks, the Gateway of India and Taj Mahal Palace & Tower.

== History ==
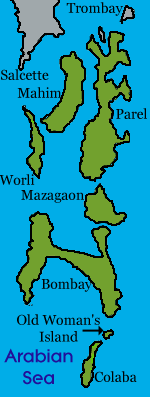
Original seven islands of Bombay

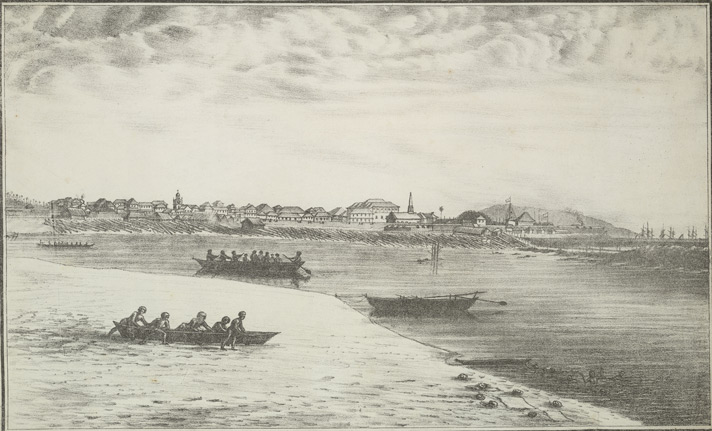
Colaba Causeway construction using timber, view from Colaba island, 1826

By the beginning of the nineteenth century, the Fort area and part of older town were overcrowded, as the island of Colaba, the southern tip of the city, had already been declared a cantonment area in 1796, barring all construction by the civilian population. Soon the boat traffic to area increased in the next few decades, and several people died due to the capsizing of overcrowded boats, making the construction of the causeway imperative. What also added to the urgency to its construction was that, Mountstuart Elphinstone, Governor of Bombay (1819–1827), had already built the first home on Malabar Hill, following which the rich quickly started moving into the centrally placed, Fort) area.

The Causeway as it is known to the locals, was constructed by the British East India Company, during the tenure of Sir Robert Grant (1779–1838) as the governor of Bombay (1835–1838), and its construction completed in 1838, which used the Old Woman's Island as a part of it; with this the last two islands of Colaba and Old Woman's Island (out of the Seven islands of Bombay), which were first taken in 1675, got connected with the mainland of Bombay. Until 1839, Colaba was accessible only during the low tide, though soon it saw rapid development in the area, especially after the construction of the Cotton Exchange at Cotton Green in 1844. The Causeway was later further widened in 1861 and 1863.

Horse-drawn tram-cars were introduced here, in 1873 by Stearns and Kitteredge, for their offices on the west side of the Causeway, where the Electric House now stands.

== Overview ==
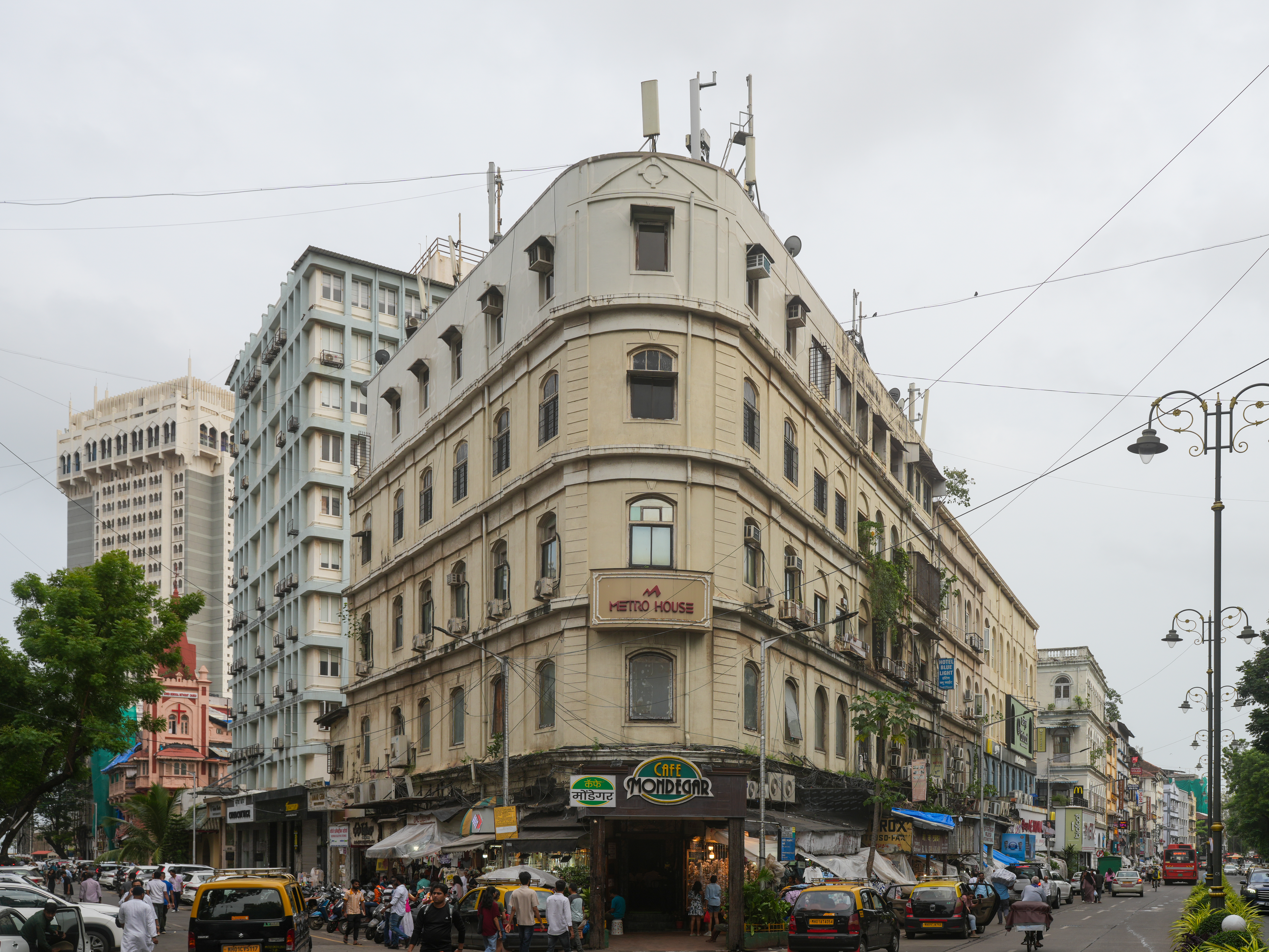
Cafe Mondegar, Metro House, Colaba Causeway

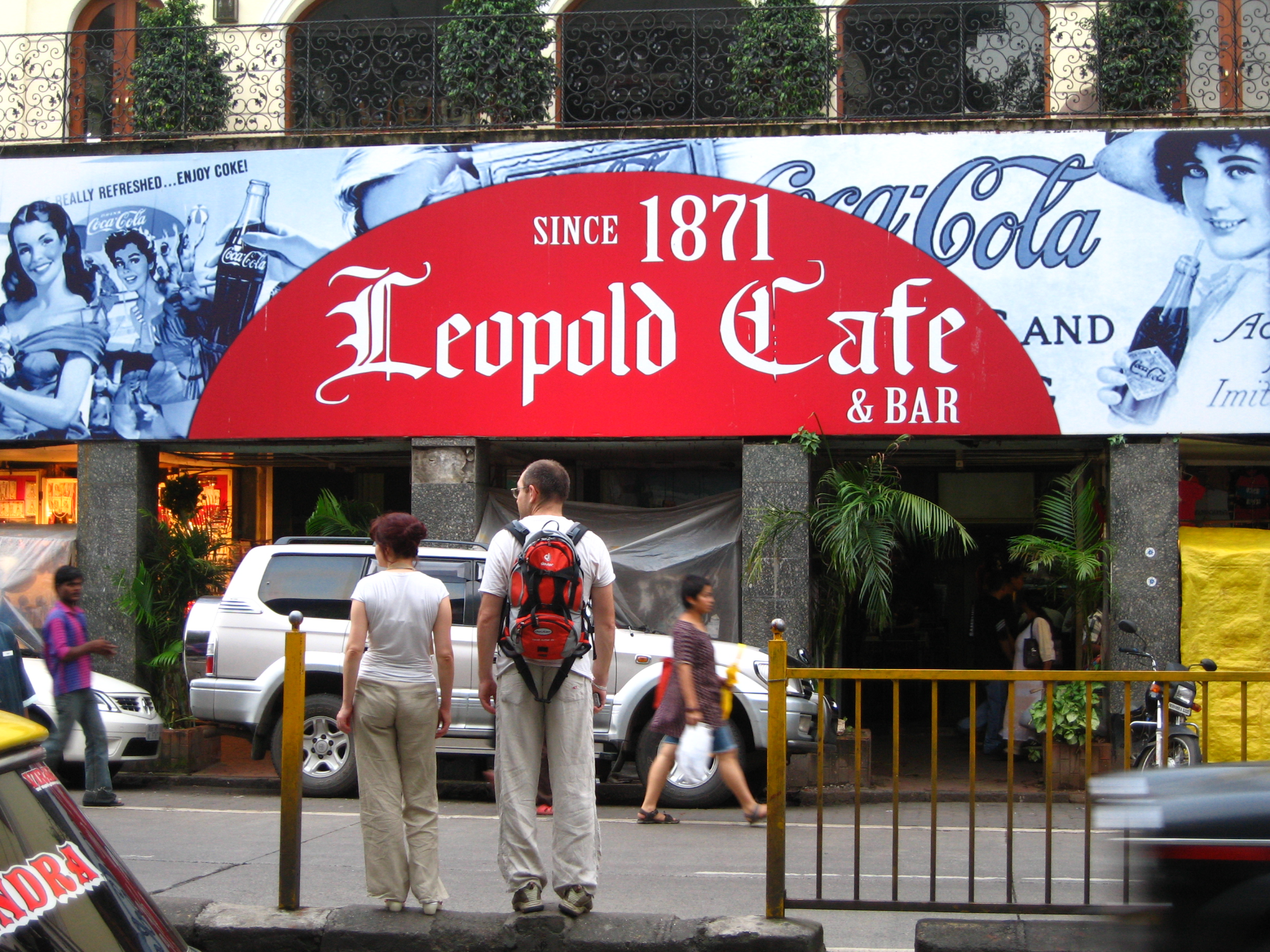
Leopold Cafe and Bar, since 1871

Today, it is termed as the 'Culture Square' of Mumbai. The architecture of the area is reminiscent of old Mumbai, fact highlighted by buildings like, National Gallery of Modern Art (NGMA), Regal Cinema, Chhatrapati Shivaji Maharaj Museum and Cusrow Baug, a Parsi residential colony built in 1934, covering an area of 84,000 square yards, which is home to over 500 families. Plus the area is also a hub of various art galleries, which makes this area a natural destination for artist community.

Apart from upmarket retail showrooms, and small shops dealing in electronic goods, cosmetics, clothes and music, it has a pavement book stall dating back several decades, besides having numerous small shops and footpath outlets selling everything from artifacts to shawls, carpets and minor antiques to slippers of all kinds, which makes tourists, backpackers and locals from South Mumbai throng the area all through the year.

Among the restaurants, cafes and roadside eateries that make the street popular with tourists and locals alike are the Indian Mughlai fame Delhi Darbar restaurant, Piccadilly restaurant, Cafe Churchill, Mings Palace, Kailash Parbat and Gokul. Cafe Mondegar, and Cafe Leopold were founded by Iranians in 1871.

Other visitors' attractions in the area are historical structures like Aghan Church in the nearby Navy Nagar, built to commemorate the dead of the disastrous First Afghan War of 1838, and the Sassoon Docks, built in 1875, by Albert Abdullah David Sassoon (1818–1896), son of David Sassoon, a philanthropist Baghdadi Jew. Today, the Sassoon Docks house one of the largest fish market of Mumbai city
