= Navy Nagar =

- Neighbourhood
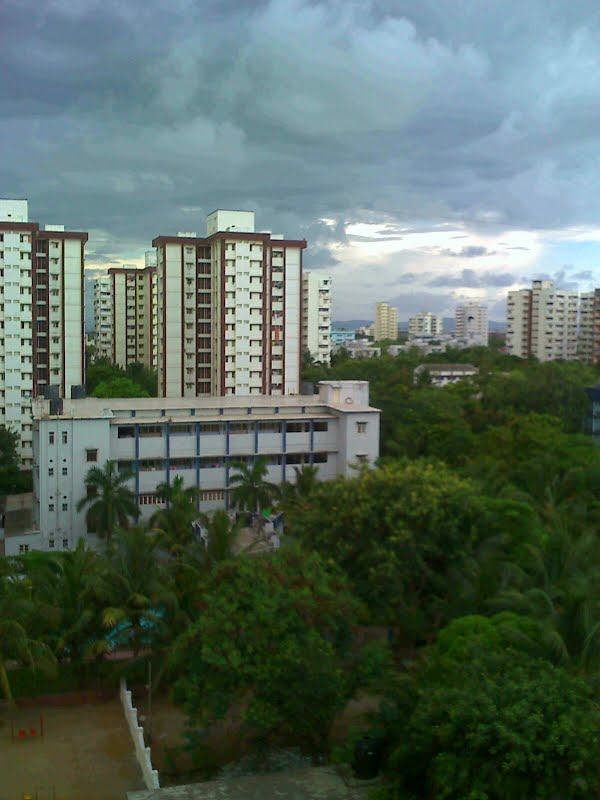
- Navy Nagar as viewed from Cody

- Location within Mumbai
- Coordinates: 18.9012°N 72.8101°E
- Country: India
- State: Maharashtra
- District: Mumbai City
- City: Mumbai
- Zone: 1
- Ward: A

Government
  - Type: Municipal Corporation
  - Body: Brihanmumbai Municipal Corporation (MCGM)
- Elevation: 4 m (13 ft)

Languages
  - Official: Marathi
- Time zone: UTC+5:30 (IST)
- PIN: 400 005
- Lok Sabha constituency: Mumbai South
- Vidhan Sabha constituency: Colaba
- Civic agency: BMC

Navy Nagar is a cantonment area in Mumbai, India, and was established in 1796. The area is owned and managed solely by the Indian Navy and entry to this area is highly restricted. Entry and exit points to the area are heavily manned by Naval Police.

== Overview ==
Navy Nagar is located at the extreme south promontory of Mumbai city, and is linked to it through the Colaba Causeway. Entry into Navy Nagar is restricted as many important officials of the Indian Navy reside in the cantonment. It is Asia's largest naval armed forces personnel residential base.

Navy Nagar houses the residences of Naval officers (also known as NOFRA) and sailors. Navy Nagar is divided into two different sections. Section one consists of "old navy nagar" and consists of smaller (generally five or lesser storied) buildings that were built up to the 1980s. "New navy nagar" consists of taller (14 storied) buildings, though a few older existing buildings are also included in it. The Tata Institute of Fundamental Research carries out research in higher sciences and the Indian Meteorological Department office (built in 1826) of Colaba are also located in Navy nagar.

Navy Nagar is maintained by the Indian Navy, law and order in the area is handled by the Naval Police and Military Police. The area is well maintained and has a large amount of greenery including an 18-hole golf course.

== History ==
The region today called Navy Nagar originally consisted of an uninhabited island called "Old Woman's Island" (a distortion of its older native name "Al Omani"), mostly covered with forests. In 1743, the island of Colaba was leased to a British man called Richard Broughton at a sum of Rs. 200 per annum, a lease that was renewed in 1764. At that time, Colaba was well known for the variety of fish that were found in nearby waters, including bombil (the dried form of which is called "Bombay Duck"), rawas, halwa, turtles, crabs, prawns and lobsters. By 1796, Colaba became a cantonment for British troops. Gradually, troops began to build structures towards the southern end of the island, then called "Upper Colaba", and a meteorological observatory (today known as Colaba Observatory) was established in 1826.

With the completion of the Colaba Causeway in 1838, these remaining two islands were joined to the rest of Mumbai. While Colaba became a centre of commerce with the opening of the Cotton Exchange at Cotton Green in 1844, the southern part of the island continued to remain mostly under the control of the defence.

During the subsequent construction of Colaba, a large network of bungalows called the "Sick Bungalows" (today INHS Aswini) were built. The church today known as Afghan Church (after the First Afghan War of 1838) was consecrated in 1858 and work on the steeple was concluded in 1865. Horse-drawn tram-cars operated by Stearns and Kitteredge (whose offices are today's "Electric House") provided transport to this new developed area. Afghan Church was also built around this time, making it one of the earliest structures built in the area. The spire of the church was often used by sailors to get their bearing.

Prong's Lighthouse, located at the southern tip of the island, was constructed in 1875, in the same year as Sassoon Docks were built by David Sassoon on reclaimed land to the north of Navy Nagar. The development of a railway terminus (BB&CI Railways) in Colaba and land reclamation pushed existing indigenous kolis to the edges of the island, towards an area to the north of today's "New Navy Nagar". Meanwhile, structures and bungalows continued to be built sporadically in Navy Nagar to house members of the troops. In 1926, a motor bus route was introduced between Afghan church, located at the fringes of Navy Nagar and Crawford market.

Navy Nagar truly started to be developed in the 1960s with the laying out of neat well planned roads, setting up of the Western naval command, construction of sailors quarters in the vicinity of a market for defence personnel (Sumitra market) and the building of accommodations for bachelors, a mess for officers (Command mess), a sports stadium and swimming pool (Kohli stadium), accommodations for the survivors of the naval ship INS Khukri (Khukri house) and the setting up of the TIFR. In the 1970s, A large circular canteen (INCS Canteen) was built for defence personnel along with residences for petty officers (buildings "A" to "K"), residences for officers (buildings "L" to "Z") and a school for their children (Kendriya Vidyalaya 1). Two cinemas were built specially for defence personnel - an open-air cinema for sailors (called "The Ground") and an enclosed cinema (called "Defence cinema"). In 1979, multi storied buildings were constructed to accommodate the growing numbers of officers, beginning with buildings called Swati, Meena and Bharani. All through, large open spaces with gardens were provided alongside these buildings.

== Schools ==
- St. Joseph's High School Colaba
- Naval K.G. School
- Kendriya Vidyalaya No 1
- Kendriya Vidyalaya No 2
- Kendriya Vidyalaya No 3
- Naval Children School Mumbai
- Army Public School
- Guru Nanak High School

== Transport ==
The area is well connected by the public transport of B.E.S.T buses. Bus No 3 serves routes between Navy Nagar and JIJAMATA UDYAN. Bus No 11LTD serves routes between Navy Nagar and BANDRA COLONY BUS STATION. Bus No 125 serves routes between Navy Nagar and WORLI VILLAGE. Bus No 137 starts and ends at Navy Nagar. The nearest railway stations to the area are Churchgate Station and the Chhatrapati Shivaji Terminus Station.
