= Colaba Observatory =

Observatory in Mumbai, India

Coordinates: 18.645513°N 72.869611°E

Colaba Observatory, also known as the Bombay Observatory, was an astronomical, timekeeping, geomagnetic and meteorological observatory located on the Island of Colaba, Mumbai (Bombay), India.

== History ==
The Colaba Observatory was built in 1826 by the East India Company for astronomical observations and time-keeping, with the purpose to provide support to British and other shipping which used the port of the then-named Bombay. The 165-year-old building served as office space for the Indian Institute of Geomagnetism. The recording of geomagnetism and meteorological observations was started at the observatory in 1841 by Arthur Bedford Orlebar, who was then Professor of Astronomy at Bombay’s Elphinstone College. Magnetic measurements between the years of 1841 and 1845 were intermittent; following 1845 they became bi-hourly, then hourly.

Sophisticated equipment invented by Francis Ronalds, the Honorary Director of the Kew Observatory, was supplied to Colaba in ensuing years. In 1846 the East India Company ordered his full atmospheric electricity collecting and measuring apparatus for the observatory. Subsequent superintendents Charles Montriou and Edward Francis Fergusson maintained contact with Ronalds and visited him at Kew for hands-on instruction. It was arranged in 1867 for Kew's photo-recording machines to be supplied so that continuous observation of atmospheric pressure, temperature and geomagnetic intensity could be performed automatically. Charles Chambers (later to become a Fellow of the Royal Society) held the Directorship when the new machines were established. Colaba Observatory became more well known through his examination of geomagnetic measurements at Colaba, and his interpretation of the physics behind the phenomena. After his untimely death in Feb. 1896, the mantle of Directorship fell on the shoulders of Nanabhoy Ardeshir Framji Moos, the first Indian to hold this position.

With an Engineering degree from Poona, and a higher degree in Science from Edinburgh in Scotland, Moos saw to the efficient functioning of Colaba Observatory, regular analysis and interpretation of the measurements, and the starting of seismological observations. In 1900 Bombay decided to convert its fleet of horse-drawn trams to electric power for public transport. The electric trams would have vitiated the data from the Colaba magnetic observatory by generating electromagnetic noise.

Moos selected an alternative site at Alibag, located about 30 km (19 mi) directly south-east of Bombay. Alibag was located "far enough from Bombay to be free from the threatened electromagnetic noise, and yet near enough to retain the same geomagnetic characteristics". These aspects were checked out carefully over a 2-year period from 1904–1906, and then only was recording at Colaba discontinued, and the electric tram service started in Bombay. The entire building was made of hand-picked, non-magnetic, Porbandar sandstone, and magnetic recording is carried on in a room built with such good insulation that the variation in temperature within is just 10 °C over an entire day.

Of the entire Colaba-Alibag data, the French geomagnetician Pierre Noel Mayaud, had the following to say in 1973:

Finally, the (magnetic) records of Colaba and Alibag were found to form a beautiful series, beginning in 1871, and making up perhaps, the most complete collection of records in the world. Their quality and especially their regularity were particularly impressive, even in comparison with the Kew and Melbourne records.

Moos retired in 1919 after leading the Colaba-Alibag Observatories to worldwide renown. In 1910 he summarised the main findings from 50 years of geomagnetic measurement at the Colaba-Alibag Observatory over 1846–1905, in two volumes titled "Magnetic observations made at the Government Observatory, Bombay for the period 1846–1905. Parts I. and II." Of these volumes and of Colaba-Alibag's performance as a Geomagnetic Observatory, J.A. Fleming, a pioneer in Terrestrial Magnetism and Electricity, had the following to say in 1954:

The Golden Jubilee of the foundation of the Magnetic Observatory at Alibag (Mumbai), is a historic one in the field of Geomagnetism, and marks the long established application of India in an unparalleled series of magnetic recording of the phenomena, and publication of interpretative discussions of the accumulated data, as prepared under the direction of India’s foremost investigator (N.A.F. Moos) in the two large volumes.

Despite over 1500 selected references in the field of geomagnetic research, Volume 3 of the Physics-of-the-Earth Series of the United States National Research Council, there is none which exhibits so wide and varied and intensive coverage of all the geomagnetic problems in the early 20th century.

Prof. K. R. Ramanathan, who assumed the Director position after Moos, and would later head the Physical Research Laboratory, Ahmedabad, said of his predecessor: “He was an ideal head of the observatory, always taking a deep interest in the welfare of his staff, and being held by them in great affection and esteem”. Over the year 1919–1971, 17 Directors steered the Colaba-Alibag Observatories through avenues of meticulous and uninterrupted geomagnetic recordings, regular publishing of the data, and discussion of observations in scientific research journals.

In 1971 the Colaba-Alibag Observatories were converted into an autonomous research organisation called the Indian Institute of Geomagnetism. Until that point the Colaba-Alibag Observatories were part of the Indian Meteorological Department. Its headquarters continued to be in Mumbai, in the building constructed by John Curin in 1826, who was an astronomer for the East India Company. The first Director of the Indian Institute of Geomagnetism over 1971–1979 was B. N. Bhargava. The proceeding Director was R. G. Rastogi over 1980–1989.

During the IGY-IGC years of 1957–1959, K. R. Ramanathan (a past Director of Colaba-Alibag), strongly advocated the setting up of magnetic observatories to examine the equatorial electrojet. The Trivandrum and Annamalainagar observatories were set up in November 1957, and were tended first under the Directorship of S. L. Malurkar, and then under P. R. Pisharoty.

Eighteen years elapsed before there was a need for further observatories along 75°E longitude meridian. The USSR sponsored "Project Geomagnetic Meridian" to serve their needs. Ujjain and Jaipur were consequently set up in July 1975, as wall as Shillong at 92°E longitude. In May 1977, Gulmarg, located very near the focus of the Sq. current system was started. In May 1991, the ninth observatory was started at Nagpur and then the observatories Vishakhapatnam, Pondicherry and Tirunelveli followed. Apart from these, a temporary station was run in the Andaman Islands in 1974 as support for the ONGC (Oil and Natural Gas Commission of India) in petroleum prospecting. Since 1979, an array of Gough-Reitzel magnetometers has operated at various sites in India for studies of the Earth's internal structure by examining electromagnetic induction within the earth. The Indian Institute of Geomagnetism currently operates Ten magnetic observatories.

== See also ==
- Equatorial Geophysical Research Laboratory
- List of astronomical observatories
