= Shri Mahila Griha Udyog Lijjat Papad =

Indian women's worker cooperative

- Logo of Lijjat Pappad since 1959
- Type: Worker cooperative
- Industry: Papads; Soaps and Detergent; Bakery products Masala (Spices); Flour
- Founded: 15 March 1959 (67 years ago)
- Founder: Jaswantiben Jamnadas Popat, Parvatiben Ramdas Thodani, Ujamben Narandas Kundalia, Banuben. N. Tanna, Laguben Amritlal Gokani, Jayaben V. Vithalani, Diwaliben Lukka
- Headquarters: Mumbai, India
- Area served: In India and 25 other countries
- Key people: Swati Paradkar, President
- Revenue: ▲₹1,600 crore (US$170 million) As of 2019
- Number of employees: 45000 (May 2021)
- Website: www.lijjat.com

Shri Mahila Griha Udyog Lijjat Papad (transl. "Women Home Industry Tasty Papad"), popularly known as Lijjat, is an Indian women's worker cooperative involved in manufacturing of various fast-moving consumer goods. The organisation's main objective is empowering women by providing them employment opportunities. Started in 1959 by seven Gujarati women in Mumbai with a seed capital of only Rs.80 (Rs.6,800 adjusting for inflation ) (US$80 in today's money), it had an annual turnover of more than Rs.1600 crore (over $224 million) in 2019. It provides employment to 45,000 (in 2021) women across the country.

Lijjat started out as a cottage industry in an urban area, but spread to the rural areas. It is considered one of the most remarkable entrepreneurial initiatives by women that is identified with female empowerment in India. Due to standardization in the Papad, 4.8 billion Papads made by 45,000 Lijjat sisters all over India have a similar taste.

== History ==
Lijjat was started by seven Gujarati women from Mumbai. The women lived in Lohana Niwas, a group of five buildings in Girgaum. They wanted to start a venture to create a sustainable livelihood using the only skill they had i.e. cooking. The seven women were Jaswantiben Jamnadas Popat, Parvatiben Ramdas Thodani, Ujamben Narandas Kundalia, Banuben. N. Tanna, Laguben Amritlal Gokani, Jayaben V. Vithalani, and Diwaliben Lukka.

The women borrowed Rs 80 from Chhaganlal Karamsi Parekh, a member of the Servants of India Society and a social worker. They took over a loss-making papad making venture by one Laxmidas bhai, and bought the necessary ingredients and the basic infrastructure required to manufacture papads. On 15 March 1959, they gathered on the terrace of their building and started with the production of 4 packets of papads. They started selling the papads to a known merchant in Bhuleshwar. From the beginning, the women had decided that they would not approach anyone for donations or help, even if the organisation incurred losses.

Chhaganlal Parekh, popularly known as Chaganbapa, became their guide. Initially, the women were making two different qualities of papads, to sell the inferior one at a cheaper rate. Chaganbapa advised them to make a standard papad and asked them never to compromise on quality. He emphasised to them the importance of running it as a business enterprise and maintaining proper accounts.

Lijjat expanded as a cooperative system. Initially, even younger girls could join, but later eighteen was fixed as the minimum age of entry. Within three months there were about 25 women making papads. Soon the women bought some equipment for the business, like utensils, cupboards, stoves, etc. In the first year, the organisation's annual sales were Rs. 6196. The broken papads were distributed among neighbours.

During the first year, the women had to stop production for four months during the rainy season as the rains would prevent the drying of the papads. The next year, they solved the problem by buying a cot and a stove. The papads were kept on the cot and the stove below the cot so that the process of drying could take place in spite of the rains.

The group got considerable publicity through word of mouth and articles in vernacular newspapers. This publicity helped it increase its membership. By the second year of its formation, 100 to 150 women had joined the group, and by the end of the third year it had more than 300 members. By this time, the terrace of seven founders could no longer accommodate the members and the ingredients, so the kneaded flour was distributed among the members who would take it to their homes and make papads. The papads were brought back for weighing and packaging.

An attempt to start a branch in Malad suburb of Mumbai, in 1961, was unsuccessful. In 1962, the name Lijjat (Gujarati for "tasty") was chosen by the group for its products. The name, suggested by Dhirajben Ruparel, was chosen in a contest held for the purpose, with prize money of Rs. 5. The organisation was named Shri Mahila Griha Udyog Lijjat Papad. In many Indian languages, Mahila means women, Griha means home, Udyog means industry. By 1962–63, its annual sales of papads touched ₹ 182,000.

In July 1966, Lijjat registered itself as a society under the Societies Registration Act 1860. In the same month, on Chaganbapa's recommendation, U N Dhebar, the chairman of KVIC personally inspected the Lijjat. KVIC or Khadi Development and Village Industries Commission is a statutory body set up by the Government of India for development of rural industries. In September 1966, KVIC formally recognised Lijjat as a unit belonging to the "processing of cereals and pulses industry group" under the Khadi and Village Industries Act. It was also recognised as a "village industry". In 1966, KVIC granted it a working capital of Rs. 800,000 (0.8 million) and was allowed certain tax exemptions.

An attempt to start a branch in Sangli town, in 1966, was unsuccessful. The first branch outside Maharashtra was established at Valod, Gujarat in 1968. After tasting tremendous success with their papads, Lijjat began producing other products like khakhra (1974), masala (1976), vadi, wheat atta, and bakery products (1979). In the 1970s, Lijjat set up flour mills (1975), printing division (1977) and polypropylene packing division (1978). The group also initiated some unsuccessful ventures such as cottage leather (1979), matches (1979), and agarbattis (incense sticks).

In July 1979, the general secretary of a trade union tried to interfere in Lijjat's affairs, making certain demands on behalf of a few member-sisters. L. C. Joshi, Labour Advocate of Bombay and a well-known industrial relations expert, was called for consultations. In his observations on "Who owns Lijjat?", he clarified that member-sisters were competent to take a decision for their own and it was not open for an outside agency to interfere with the internal working of Lijjat.

In 1985, the Lijjat branch at Jabalpur was taken over by one Shantilal Shah as his own unit, which he ran with the help of a Sanchalika (branch head), who was wife of his employee. Lijjat went through tremendous pressures and court stay orders to retrieve the situation.

In 1987, Lijjat purchased new premises at Kamal Apartments in Bandra, a suburb of Mumbai. The registered office shifted to the Bandra with effect from July 1988. In 1988, Lijjat entered the soap market with Sasa detergent and soap. Sasa had annual sales of Rs 500 million, accounting for 17 percent of Lijjat's total turnover in 1998. In March 1996, the 50th branch of Lijjat was inaugurated in Mumbai.

In the 1980s, Lijjat also started taking part in several trade fairs and exhibitions, which improved its sales and made the brand name "Lijjat" well known among the people. The advertising was undertaken through the vernacular newspapers, television and radio. The institution sponsored programs and gave away gifts for the winners of specific shows in the television. The money for advertisements was spent by the Polypropylene Division, which recovered the same by adding it to the price of the bags that it supplied to all the branches and divisions throughout India.

In the 1980s and 1990s, Lijjat started attracting attention of foreign visitors and officials. The Vice-President of Uganda, Dr. Speciosa Wandira-Kazibwe, visited Lijjat's central office in January 1996, since she wanted to start a similar institution in Uganda. Lijjat started exporting its products with the help of merchant importers in the United Kingdom, the United States, the Middle East, Singapore, the Netherlands Thailand, and other countries. Its annual exports accounted for more than US$2.4 million in 2001. As its popularity grew, Lijjat started facing the problem of fake Lijjat papads being introduced in the market. In June 2001, three persons were arrested in this connection, in Bihar. Lijjat's website explains the identification features of original Lijjat papads.

Lijjat received the "Best Village Industries Institution" award from KVIC for the period 1998–99 to 2000–01. In 2002, the "Businesswoman of the Year" award was given to "The Women Behind Lijjat Papad" at The Economic Times Awards for Corporate Excellence. At the awards ceremony, the President of Lijjat urged the State Governments of Maharashtra and Punjab to reconsider their decision of withdrawing the tax exemption on Lijjat's Sasa Detergent.

In 2002, Lijjat had a turnover of Rs 3 billion and exports worth Rs. 100 million. It employed 42,000 people in 62 divisions all over the country.(2002) The 62nd branch became operational at Jammu and Kashmir in 2002, enrolling over 150 members.

In 2003, Lijjat received the "Best Village Industry Institution". It also received the PHDCCI Brand Equity Award 2005. Lijjat marked its 50th year of existence on 15 March 2009.

== Exports ==
Lijjat Papad Business is spread in 82 branches in 17 states of India. Lijjat Papad currently exports its products with the help of Merchant Exporters. They export their products to 25+ countries including United States, United Kingdom, France, Germany, Italy, Middle Eastern countries, Thailand, Singapore, Hongkong (China), Netherlands, Japan, Canada, Australia, South Africa and many other Countries.

== Organization structure and management ==
Lijjat believes in the philosophy of sarvodaya and collective ownership. It accepts all its working members as the owners and an equal partaker in both profit and loss. The members are co-owners and fondly referred to as "sisters". All the decisions are based on consensus and any member-sister has the right to veto a decision. Men can only be salaried employees (accountants, drivers or security guards), and not the members of the organisation (i.e. they are not the owners).

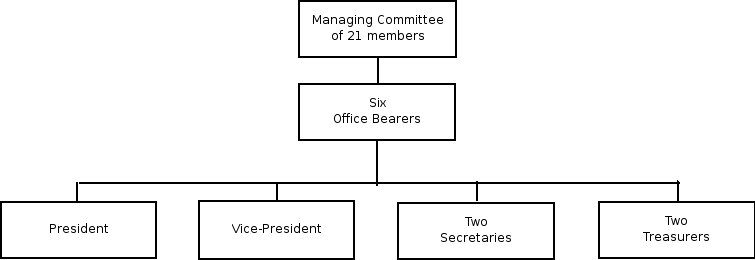
Lijjat organisation structure

The running of the organisation is entrusted to a managing committee of twenty-one members, including the President, the Vice-President, two secretaries, and two treasurers. Sanchalikas are in-charge of various branches and divisions. The office bearers of the managing committee and the sanchalikas are elected from among the member-sisters every three years. Each branch has a committee of eleven member-sisters, again chosen by consensus.

The central office at Mumbai previously coordinated the activities of various branches. But, as the organisation grew, the authority was decentralised in terms of work and sharing of profits at the branch level. However, the sanchalikas still need the managing committee's approval before they undertake any new project or activity.

All the branches follow the same set of instructions and have similar accounting system. To co-ordinate various branches in a region or state, there are branch co-ordination committees and area meetings of the various branches in a state. The annual general meeting is attended by member-sisters representing branches and divisions from all over India.

Currently, Lijjat has branches in seventeen Indian states – Andhra Pradesh, Bihar, Delhi, Gujarat, Haryana, Jharkhand, Jammu and Kashmir, Karnataka, Kerala, Madhya Pradesh, Maharashtra, Orissa, Punjab, Rajasthan, Tamil Nadu, Uttar Pradesh, and West Bengal.

Account books are easily accessible to all the member-sisters, ensuring transparency. Lijjat follows its own financial accountability principle. There is no credit method for running operations in the organisation. Every payment is done on a daily basis, except for the outside supply of raw material. Profits and losses are shared equally among the members of a given branch. In the initial days of Lijjat, the profits of the first six months were shared equally among all sisters in the form of gold. This sharing practice is still in effect, but now the decision whether to share the profits in gold or in cash is made at the branch level. The cost of national-level advertising is borne by all branches and divisions, depending on their individual production abilities.

The quality of papads can vary due to quality of water used in various parts of India. To avoid any inconsistencies, the final products are tested in the Lijjat's laboratory in Mumbai. In the monthly meetings, the quality issue and modifications are tested. The central office purchases and distributes all ingredients to maintain the quality of the final product. For example, the urad dal is imported from Myanmar, asafetida is imported from Afghanistan, and black pepper comes from Kerala. The committee often makes surprise visits to various branches to assure that production conditions are hygienic. When a new branch of Lijjat opens, a neighbouring Lijjat branch helps it by guiding and training new members.

On successive failures of a branch to abide by the organisation's philosophy of consistent quality and production of papads, the central committee reduces the daily wages of its members by 1 rupee. The member-sisters are also rewarded for extra effort. For instance, in 2002, the member-sisters at the Rajkot branch received Rs 4,000 each as bonus, while the member sisters at Mumbai and Thane branches received a 5-gram gold coin as an incentive. Several issues of Lijjat Patrika enumerate the names of the names/numbers of the member-sisters, who were rewarded with the cash or gold, for their extra efforts.

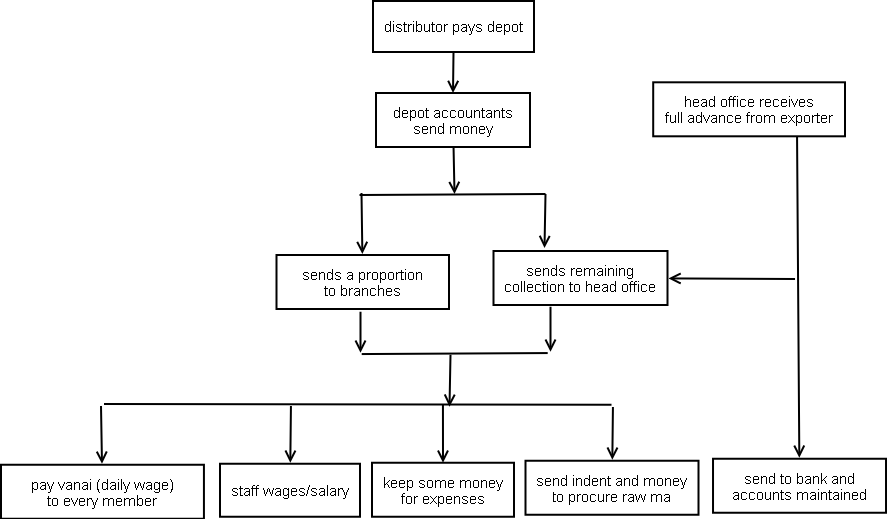
Lijjat collection flowchart

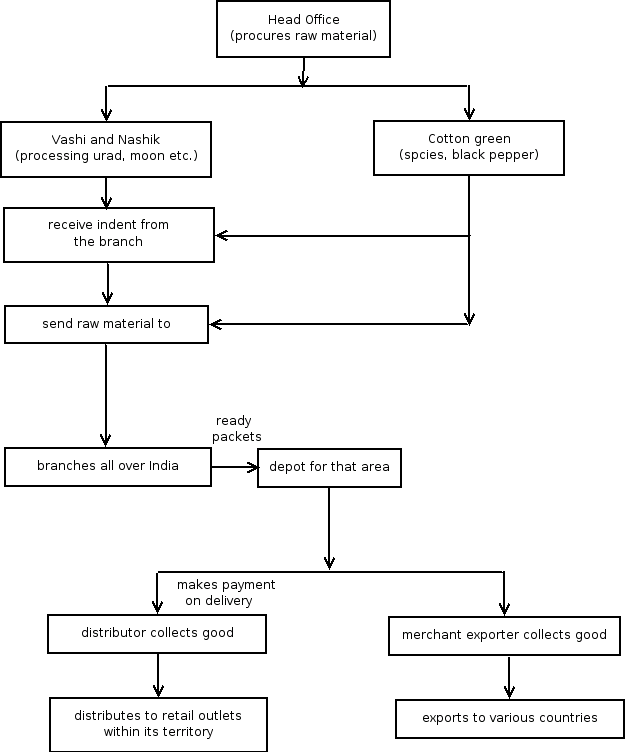
Lijjat distribution flowchart

== Products and divisions ==
Lijjat manufactures several products, of which the papad is the most famous:

- Papad (Fourteen flavours, including lasan, moong, mirch, Punjabi and urad)
- Khakhra
- Appalam
- Masala
- Vadi
- Gehu Atta (wheat flour)
- Bakery products
- Chapati

Lijjat has several divisions and manufacturing units:

- Flour Division (Vashi)
- Masala Division and Quality Control Laboratory (Cotton Green)
- Printing Division (Cotton Green)
- Advertising Division, Bandra

== Culture ==
Lijjat Patrika, the in-house magazine, is published and circulated for a nominal rate to those interested in the activities of Lijjat. It is published in many languages Hindi, English, Marathi, Gujarati. It has emerged as a strong mode of communication for information related to significant events and initiatives at Lijjat, in addition to presenting articles on women.

Member sisters across all branches of Lijjat recite an all-religion prayer before beginning their daily activities. The sisters are free to choose their activities and each activity is given equal importance.

Leaving the organisation is voluntary. No member sister can be asked to leave unless or until she goes against the organizational principles. There is no fixed retirement age at Lijjat. Once, when the president Jyoti Naik was questioned about this anomaly, she said that there was no need to make provision for a retirement age, as the emphasis obviously was on earning one's bread through daily work, all through one's life.

== Role in women empowerment ==
The growth of the Lijjat is often seen in the larger canvas of women and their empowerment. The organisation has undertaken various efforts to promote literacy and computer education for member-sisters and their families. A literacy campaign for sisters began through literacy classes at Girgaum on 18 June 1999. Later, the managing committee decided to start such classes in all its branches. From 1980 onwards, Lijjat started giving Chhaganbapa Smruti Scholarships to the daughters of the member-sisters.

The member-sisters used their organisation as a medium to promote their and their families' welfare. In the Valod centre, they set up an educational and hobby centre for the rural women. Orientation courses in typing, cooking, sewing, knitting and toy making as well as other courses like child welfare, first aid and hygiene were taught. The first ever pucca (tarred) road in Valod to be built and inaugurated in 1979 was with the help of the Lijjat, Valod branch.

In 1979, Lijjat teamed up with UNICEF to organise a seminar in Mumbai on "Child Care and Mother Welfare", as part of the International Year of the Child celebrations. In October 1984, Bhadraben Bhatt represented Lijjat at the UNESCO sponsored international workshop on "The role of women in the assimilation and spread of technological innovation" held at NITIE, Powai. Alkaben Kalia represented Lijjat at the national level meeting on women convened by the National Commission on Self Employed Women.

At the behest of Mother Teresa, the member-sisters also took part in some activities of Asha Dhan, an institution to care for destitute women.

Lijjat member-sisters also tried to start a co-operative bank, but the effort was not very successful.

== Contribution to social service ==
On several occasions, the Lijjat member-sisters have undertaken social service activities such as distributing nutritious food for poor children, donating money for conducting community marriage, instituting prize-money for spread of primary education, undertaking blood donation drive, organising health camps, plantation drives and even making donations to Government bodies. In 1999, the Mumbai City felicitated Rukminiben B. Pawar, Lijjat President, as an outstanding woman in the field of social work.

Lijjat undertook the rehabilitation of Chincholi (Jogan), the earthquake affected village in the Latur district of Maharashtra. The institution provided the finance and supervised the work of construction of fifty-eight houses for the people of the village. Member-sisters donated money from their daily vanai (wage). After the 2001 Gujarat earthquake, all the branches of Lijjat gave a total donation of more than ₹ 4.8 million, including Rs 1 million from the central office. Lijjat built forty houses for the rehabilitation of the people of Bhujpur (Bhachau) in Kutch District.

== See also ==
- Amul
- Cooperative movement in India
- Khadi
- Khadi and Village Industries Commission
