= Cuffe Parade =

- Neighbourhood
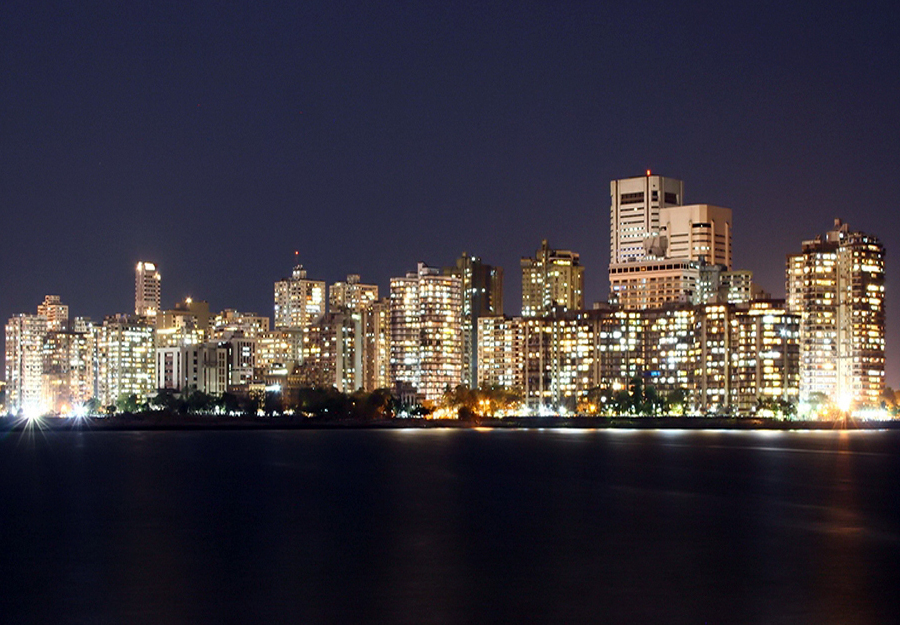
- A view towards the World Trade Center

- Location within Mumbai Location within Maharashtra Location within India
- Coordinates: 18.91°N 72.81°E
- Country: India
- State: Maharashtra
- District: Mumbai City
- Metro: Mumbai

Government
  - Type: Municipal Corporation
  - Body: Brihanmumbai Municipal Corporation (MCGM)
- Elevation: 4 m (13 ft)

Languages
  - Official: Marathi
- Time zone: UTC+5:30 (IST)
- PIN: 400005
- Area code: 022
- Vehicle registration: MH 01
- Civic agency: BMC

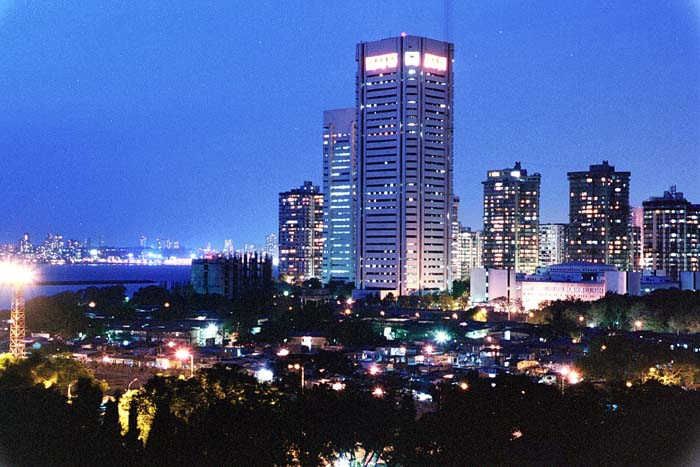
MVRDC

Cuffe Parade is a historic neighbourhood and significant business district of the city of Mumbai, India. It is home to a collection of commercial and office high-rises as well as residential buildings. It is bordered to the north by Nariman Point which, along with Cuffe Parade, forms the greater CBD region of the city. It was built in 1906 by the Bombay City Improvement Trust and named after a member of the Trust, T.W. Cuffe.

== History ==
In 1888, whilst Bombay was part of the British Raj, the Bombay Public Works Department created plans for land reclamation from Back Bay. Following the third plague pandemic resulting in the British authorities building new housing to improve sanitary conditions, the scheme proceeded and the initial reclamation project was completed in 1905 to coincide with The Prince of Wales' visit to Bombay that same year. The buildings built on Cuffe Parade were completed in 1906, where it was subsequently named after T. W. Cuffe of the Bombay City Improvement Trust that funded the project. It subsequently grew into an upmarket Bombay neighbourhood.

In 2005, the Cuffe Parade Residents Association turned unused scrubland in the neighbourhood into a public gardens, however the gardens were often damaged in monsoon storms due to the sea washing over it. In 2011, the Mumbai Metropolitan Region Development Authority agreed to fund the construction of a sea wall in order to protect the gardens.

== Overview ==
To the east is Colaba Causeway and to the west is the Arabian Sea. Among the notable residents are members of the Ambani and Husain families. The arterial road which runs through Cuffe Parade (Capt. Prakash Pethe Marg) is named after the Indian Army officer Capt. Prakash Pethe who was martyred in the Indo-Pakistani war of 1971.

- Prominent businessmen living here include Subhash Chandra of Essel Group, the Goenka family, the Patni family, Nimesh Kampani of JM Financial. The skyline consists of prominent buildings like Maker Tower and Jolly Maker-1, considered to be the richest housing society in Mumbai.
- Cuffe Parade Resident Association is a citizen's organisation looking after the interests of the Cuffe Parade area since 1971.
- The children of the area are educated by schools organised by Bina Sheth Lashkari.

== Local landmarks ==
- BD Somani International School
- Colaba Woods
- World Trade Centre
