= Equatorial Geophysical Research Laboratory =

The Equatorial Geophysical Research Laboratory (EGRL) is a regional center of the Indian Institute of Geomagnetism, Department of Science & Technology.

Research is mainly focused on upper atmospheric studies. Several advanced geophysical experimental facilities are housed in EGRL. It houses magnetometers for measuring geomagnetic fields and varieties of radars and weather stations.

At present, there are thirteen staff members (scientists, technical officers, administrators) and three research scholars in EGRL. Research scholars register for their Ph.D. in Physics at MS University, Tirunelveli.

== Sources ==
- https://web.archive.org/web/20120424000900/http://203.193.153.36/iigweb/index.php?page_id=133
