= Old Woman's Island =

Island in Mumbai, India

Coordinates: 18°55′08″N 72°49′45″E

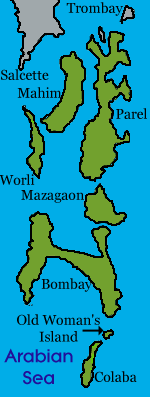
Seven Islands of Mumbai

The Old Woman's Island, also known as Little Colaba, is one of the seven islands composing the city of Mumbai, India, and part of the historic Old Mumbai.

The Colaba Causeway built in 1838, connected this last island to the mainland of Mumbai, along with the island of Colaba.
