= Gokul (restaurant) =

Pub in Mumbai, India

Coordinates: 18.922887°N 72.832115°E

Gokul is a pub in Colaba, Mumbai. Located behind The Taj Mahal Palace Hotel next to Regal Cinema, it is renowned for its cheap alcoholic beverages (mostly beer) sold almost at retail value (i.e. without the extra charges added to alcoholic beverages in Mumbai if they are consumed in restaurants). Because of its low prices it is popular with the students of institutes in the area, achieving cult status with them. However, it is also frequented by journalists, lawyers, researchers and businessmen who work in the South Mumbai area.

The restaurant seating is divided into two levels - the upstairs (airconditioned) section and the downstairs (non-airconditioned). These in turn are subdivided into smoking and non-smoking. With an emphasis on functionality rather than aesthetics, the lack of decoration is reportedly part of "its charm".

== See also ==
- Leopold Cafe
