= K. R. Ramanathan =

Indian physicist and meteorologist (1893 – 1984)

Diwan Bahadur K. R. Ramanathan FNA, FASc, FIAS, FRMetS
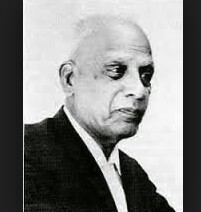
- Born: Kalpathi Ramakrishna Ramanathan; 28 February 1893; Kalpathi, Palakkad, Madras Presidency, British India
- Died: 31 December 1984 (aged 91)
- Awards: Fellow, Indian Academy of Sciences, 1934; Padma Bhushan, 1965; Padma Vibhushan, 1976; The Aryabhata Medal, awarded by Indian National Science Academy, 1977
- Scientific career
- Fields: Physics and Meteorology
- Doctoral advisor: C. V. Raman

Kalpathi Ramakrishna Ramanathan (28 February 1893 – 31 December 1984) was an Indian physicist and meteorologist. He was the first director of the Physical Research Laboratory, Ahmedabad. From 1954 to 1957, Ramanathan was President of the International Union of Geodesy and Geophysics (IUGG). Ramanathan was awarded the Padma Bhushan in 1965 and the Padma Vibhushan in 1976.

== Early life ==
Ramanathan was born in Kalpathi, Palakkad to Ramakrishna Sastrigal, an astrologer, printer and Sanskrit scholar. After completing secondary school, he entered the Government Victoria College, Palakkad in 1909. In 1911, he received a government scholarship to attend the Presidency College, Madras, where he studied for a B.A. (Hons.) degree in physics. He received his honours degree in 1914, and an M.A. two years later in 1916. After taking his M.A., the principal of the Maharaja's College of Science in Thiruvananthapuram in Travancore (now the University College Thiruvananthapuram), who was one of his examiners, offered him the post of a demonstrator in physics. At the college, Ramanathan enjoyed the freedom to conduct his own investigations and to hone his laboratory skills. He travelled across the kingdom and developed the first rainfall map of Travancore; in conjunction with this study, he published his first research paper: "On Thunderstorms over Trivandrum." In late 1921, Ramanathan moved to Calcutta to collaborate with C. V. Raman, who had accepted him as a doctoral student, on studies of X-ray diffraction in liquids. For this work, in June 1922 he received the first-ever D.Sc. degree awarded by the University of Madras. He joined Rangoon University as assistant professor of physics in late 1922. During the university holidays, he continued to carry out post-doctoral research under Raman's guidance, and in 1923 observed an unusual "fluorescence" in a beam of light when it was diffracted in water - which Raman eventually concluded was an effect caused by the substance, associated with a change in frequency equal to the molecular vibrational frequency.

== India Meteorological Department ==
In 1925, Ramanathan was appointed as a senior scientist in the India Meteorological Department. Over the next 20 years, he made numerous observations and conducted studies on the nature of the atmosphere, atmospheric ozone, monsoonal patterns and solar and atmospheric radiation, among other areas. As director of the Colaba and Alibag Magnetic Observatories and subsequently as director of the Kodaikanal Solar Physics Observatory, he had a role in their later conversions to the Indian Institute of Geomagnetism and the Indian Institute of Astrophysics. Appointed Superintending Meteorologist of the Poona Observatory during the Second World War, he assisted in training meteorological personnel for the Indian Air Force as it rapidly expanded during the wartime years.

== Physical Research Laboratory ==
Having reached the statutory retirement age of 55 in 1948, Ramanathan left the Indian Meteorological Department that year and joined the newly established Physical Research Laboratory (PRL), Ahmedabad as its first director. He established Dobson ozone spectrophotometer stations in India and expanded on his earlier researches into atmospheric ozone; among his major contributions to the field was elucidating the relationship of atmospheric ozone in connection to atmospheric circulation. During his time at the PRL, he and his students made important contributions to studies on the physics of the ionosphere. Under Ramanathan's directorship, the PRL also played an important role in building the early Indian space programme, notably through testing sounding rockets and helping to develop the Thumba Equatorial Rocket Launching Station (TERLS).

== Later life ==
Ramanathan retired in 1966 but continued to serve PRL as Emeritus Professor until his death on New Year's Eve 1984 at the age of 91. He guided over 30 research scholars during his scientific career. While a student at Presidency College Madras, he married Parvati Ammal, the daughter of a railways official, with whom he had four daughters and two sons. His wife predeceased him in 1952.

== Honours and awards ==
- Foundation Fellow of the Indian Academy of Sciences (FASc; 1934)
- Foundation Fellow of the Indian National Science Academy (FNA; 1935) (Note: Prior to 1970, the Indian National Science Academy was named the "National Institute of Sciences of India", and its fellows bore the post-nominal "FNI". The post-nominal became "FNA" in 1970 when the association adopted its present name.)
- Title of Diwan Bahadur (British Government, 1943 Birthday Honours list)
- Fellow of the Indian Association for the Cultivation of Science (FIAS; 1952)
- International Meteorological Organization Prize of the World Meteorological Organization (1959).
- Honorary Fellow of the Royal Meteorological Society (Hon. FRMetS; 1960)
- Padma Bhushan (1965)
- Padma Vibhushan (1976)
- The Aryabhata Medal, awarded by Indian National Science Academy, 1977

The Kalpathi Ramakrishna Ramanathan Medal was established in 1987 in honor of him by the Indian National Science Academy.
