= Jaswantiben Jamnadas Popat =

Indian businesswoman (1930–2023)

- Born: Jaswantiben; 1930; India
- Died: 21 September 2023 (aged 92–93)
- Occupation: Entrepreneur
- Years active: 1959―2023
- Organization: Shri Mahila Griha Udyog Lijjat Papad
- Known for: Founder of Shri Mahila Griha Udyog Lijjat Papad
- Awards: Padma Shri, (2021)

Jaswantiben Jamnadas Popat (1930 – 21 September 2023) was an Indian businesswoman, who was one of the founders of Shri Mahila Griha Udyog Lijjat Papad, a women's worker cooperative involved in manufacturing of various fast-moving consumer goods. On January 26, 2021, the Government of India conferred her India's fourth-highest civilian award the Padma Shri in Trade and Industry category.

jaswantiben Popat was one of the seven founders who founded the company producing popular 'Lijjat Papad' in 1959 as a household venture. She started the company with a seed capital of ₹80 (92¢ US), their cooperative venture - the Shri Mahila Griha Udyog Lijjat Papad and now has a turnover of over ₹1,600 crore (US$183 million). Her organization has employed nearly 45,000 women.

Jaswantiben died on 21 September 2023.

== See also ==
- List of Padma Shri award recipients (2020–2029)
