= Bina Sheth Lashkari =

Indian Doorstep school founder in India

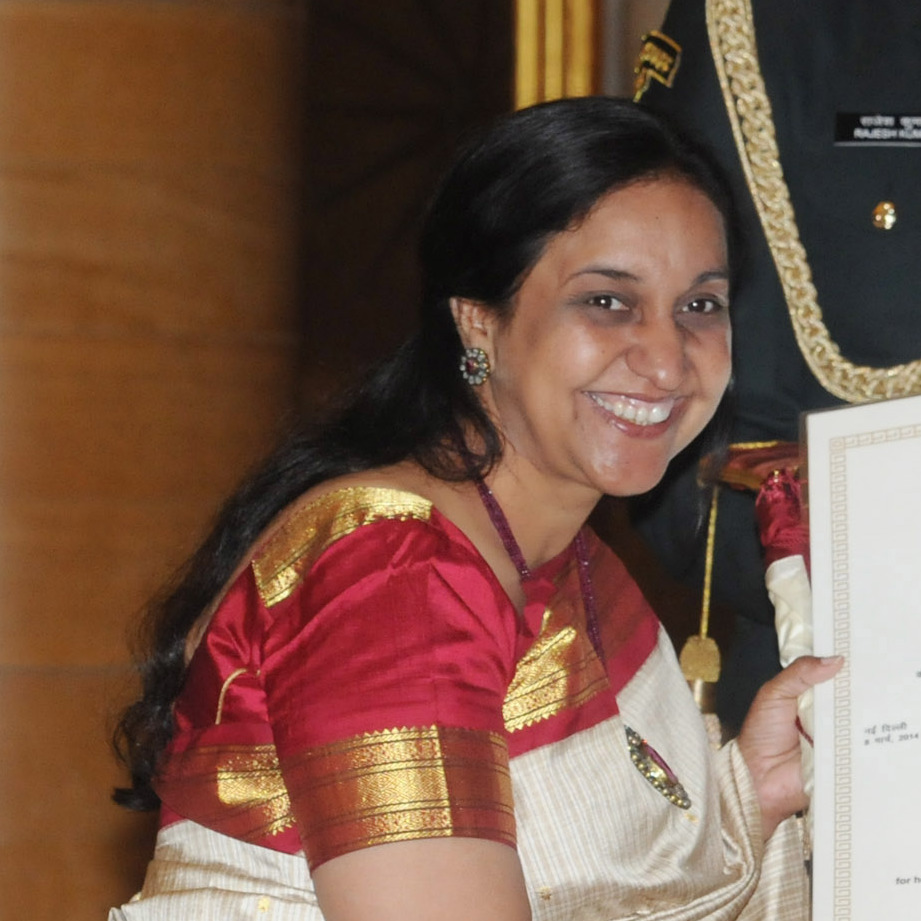
- in 2013
- Known for: starting a Doorstep School

Bina Sheth Lashkari is an Indian Doorstep school founder in India. Over 30 years she has helped to organise the education of 100,000 children in Mumbai. In 2013 she was awarded the Stree Shakti Puraskar.

== Life ==
Laskari took her first degree in child psychology.

She started her work when she founded her first school in Cuffe Parade in Colaba in 1988. At the time children from the slums could only look on as richer children went off to posh schools. She originally had 25 children and their Banjara parents were working for low wages gutting fish. She had been inspired to the idea while she was taking her master's degree in social work. She had visited the local school and she was surprised to find that children were leaving after her three or four years. Visiting the children's parent she found that the children were already an essential part of their families wage earning. They could not be spared if the family was to survive. With the assistance of Rajani Paranjape she started a school that could be on their doorstep.

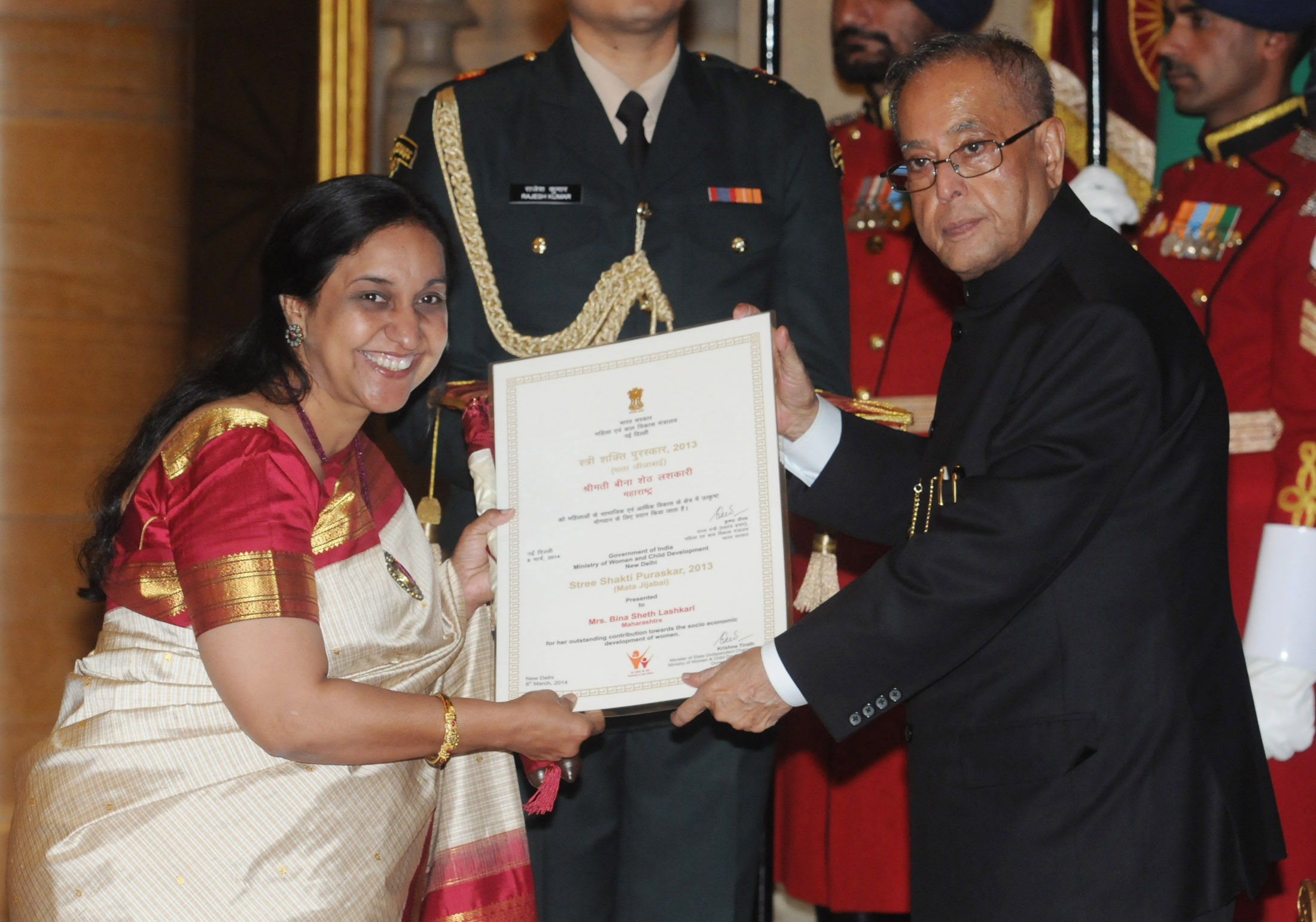
Pranab Mukherjee presenting the "Mata Jijabai Award" to Smt. Bina Sheth Lashkari (Maharashtra), at the presentation of Stree Shakti Puraskar 2013 on the occasion of International Women’s Day, at Rashtrapati Bhavan

On International Women’s Day in 2013 the President of India Pranab Mukherjee presented her with the Stree Shakti Puraskar. The award was one of six made in New Delhi at the Presidential Palace - Rashtrapati Bhavan. She was nominated by the state of Maharashtra for her work in education and training.

In 2016 the Duke and Duchess of Cambridge visited her in Mumbai. That year the school's campaign had led to the naming of streets after their pupils. Previously unnamed streets in three areas of Mumbai were named after their students. The objective is to inspire other students to gain an education and have ambition.

In 2019 it was estimated that over the 31 years she has helped to organise the education of 100,000 children in Mumbai. By that time the school had seven yellow school buses with school equipment inside them. Each of them stops four times each day for two and a half hours, so each bus is teaching 100 children each day.
