= Colaba Woods =

Public garden

Colaba Woods Garden
- Mumbai, Maharashtra
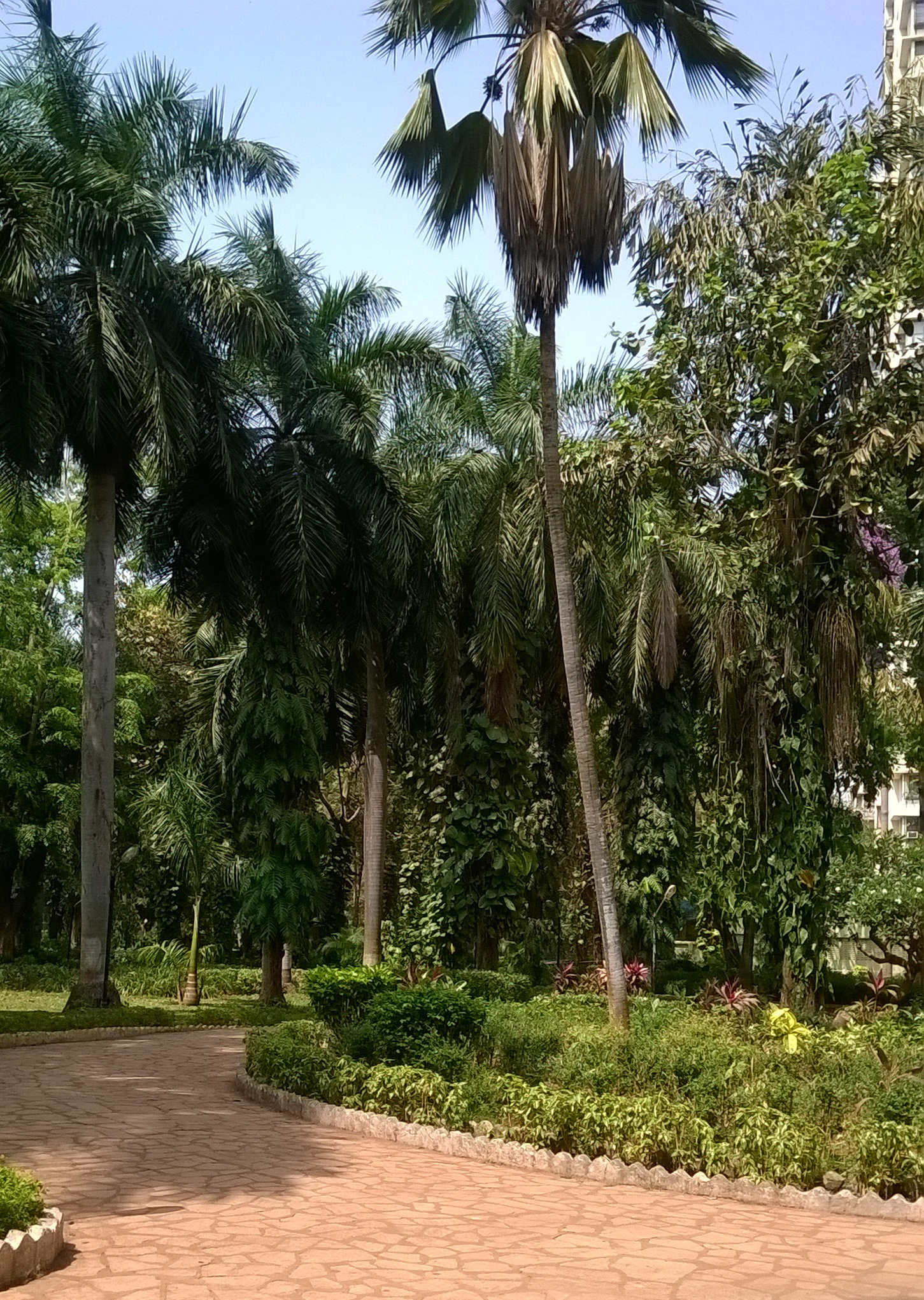
- Colaba woods garden

Site information
- Type: Garden
- Owner: Municipal Corp. Of Mumbai
- Open to the public: Yes
- Condition: Well Maintained

Location
- Shown within Maharashtra
- Coordinates: 18°54′46.6″N 72°49′09″E
- Height: sea Level

Site history
- Built: 1980(approx)
- Built by: MCGM
- Materials: Bricks

Map of Colaba Woods

Colaba Woods (Marathi: कुलाबा वुड्स) is a garden in the Colaba area of Mumbai, India.

Colaba Woods is located near the President Hotel in South Mumbai. About 5 km from the CST railway station. The Colaba woods garden is located on C.T.S. No. 87A and 88B. It is spread over 31,000 m^{2}. It is a beautiful wooded tree garden near to high sky scraper buildings. In the early 1900's the Tata Electric Company took over an eight-acre plot of land from the MCGM. This was called as Colaba woods. It was a refuse dump. Today, this green forest in the concrete jungle at Cuffe Parade is the lung of the locality. It has several facilities like joggers' track, an amphi-theater, a readers' corner for street children, basketball courts, children play areas and areas for relaxation. Colaba Woods won the Urban Heritage Award in 1989.

== Tree enumeration study ==
In 2015, the Mumbai Metro Rail Corporation revealed its plans to use up a quarter of the Colaba Woods for construction of the Colaba metro station. To save the garden by highlighting its biological diversity, the local residents sanctioned an elaborate survey of the area.

A tree enumeration study was carried out by botanist Dr. Chandrashekhar Marathe during the month of April- 2015 to create an inventory of Tree species. Each tree was noted, identified, its girth (Stem circumference) was measured by measuring tape, the height and canopy diameter was noted approximately. A rough sketch of the Garden was made. The garden was divided into zones for convenience. The pathways were taken as zone boundary.

During the study, a total of 803 trees were mapped and measured. Of the 803 individuals counted, 14 were dead. The 803 number of Trees that were observed during the survey belonged to 99 species. Out of total 803 tree species 543 trees are exotic while the remaining 260 are Native species. Out of 803 species about 284 trees are more than 10 m (30 feet) in height, which is rare in South Mumbai's densely populated urban area.

Some of the unique tree species are as below:

- Toona ciliata M. Roem: There are two very old trees of Toona ( Scientific name Toona ciliata M. Roem. synonym Toona hexandra (Roxb.) Roem.) . According to the Tree census report of MCGM in Year 2008, only one tree of Toona was found in Mumbai, again in Ward A of Mumbai. It clearly means it is the only tree left in Mumbai.
- Nephelium chinensis (Lour.) Almeida- / LycheeThere is single tree species of Litchi ( 165 in Mumbai) found in the garden. Most of the Litchi trees do not bear fruits in Mumbai, but the tree in Colaba woods is fruiting well. This probably is only due to tall trees around, which help to keep climate cool and pollution-free.
- Koelreuteria paniculata Laxm. Amazingly there is one very old small tree of Koelreuteria. It is also called Flame Gold tree. According to the Tree census report of MCGM in Year 2008, only two tree of Koelreuteria were found in Mumbai, again in Ward A of Mumbai. It clearly means it is one of the two trees left in Mumbai.

In the entire Mumbai region, 368 tree species were identified in the tree census report. In Colaba woods alone, 99 species are found. Trees like Undi, Ambada and Variegated Wad, Mysore fig and Mabolo trees are unique to this Garden, this shows the richness of the garden in terms of variety of trees in 3 Ha of land. There are 104 fruit bearing trees. This amounts to 13% of the total trees. The fruit bearing trees play an important role in providing fruits and shelter for birds, bats and squirrels.

The study cautioned against cutting down of these trees for the metro station, arguing that relocation of trees is not an option. Giant trees with more than 150 cm girth and 10 m height would not sustain the shock due to relocation. The present tree population would be subjected to major threat due to air pollution, rise in local temperature and water logging of the soil. The removal of trees in the garden area will remove the green cover around the garden; this would lead to rise in the temperature. The untreated slurry and muck if allowed to stagnate in the garden area would lead to percolate huge amount of water in the soil. This will hamper the respiration process of the roots of the giant trees. Almost all the trees are showing healthy growth now. However massive civil developmental work would disturb the local climate which would ultimately lead to destruction of trees.

== How to visit ==
This garden is at 30 mins drive from CST railway station. Best means to reach from any part of the south Mumbai is by BEST buses . The garden is open for visitors from 7am to 10am and in the evening 4.30pm to 8pm. Photography and collection of plants and flowers is not allowed in the garden.

== Gallery ==
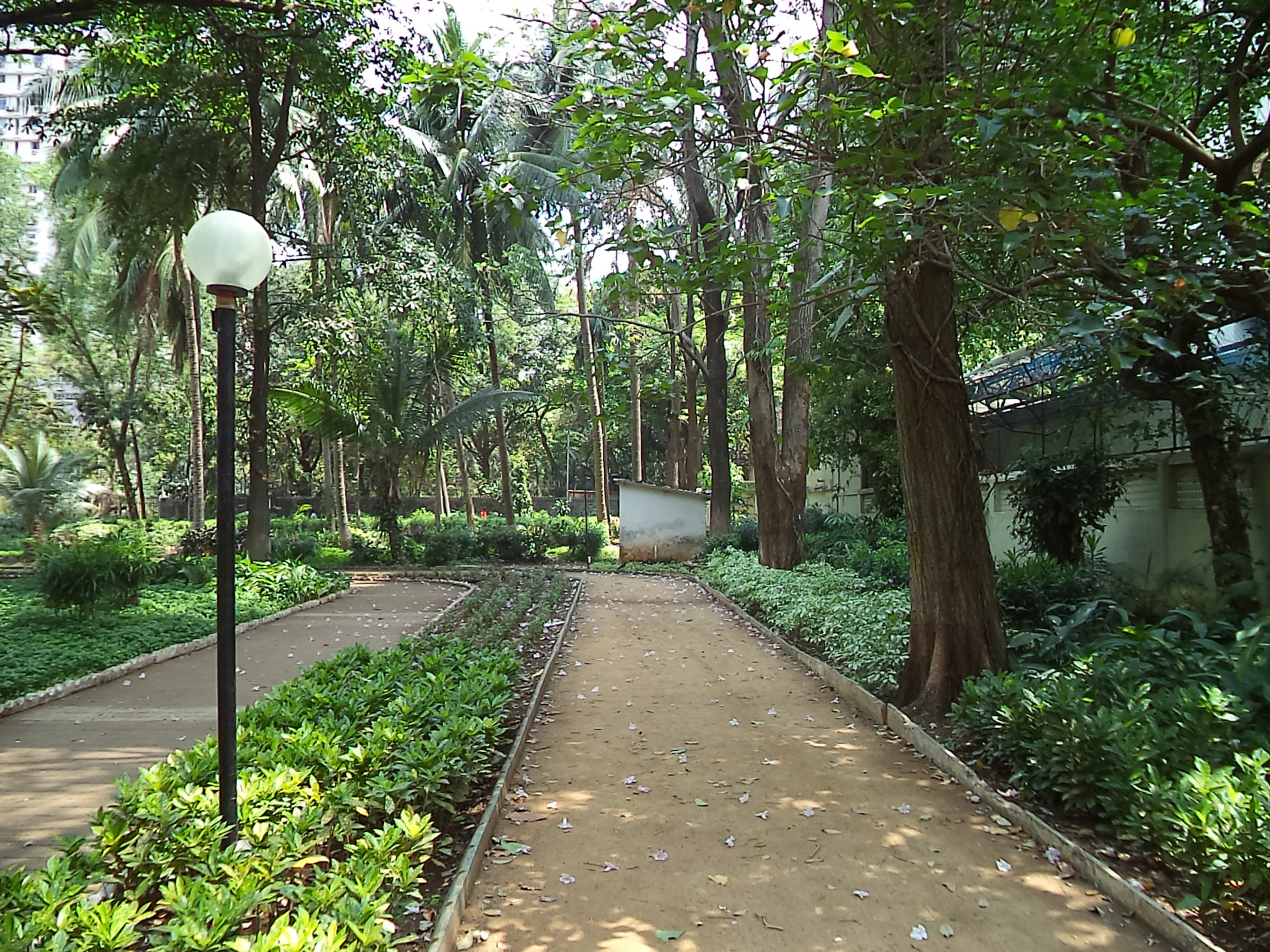
Walkway in the garden

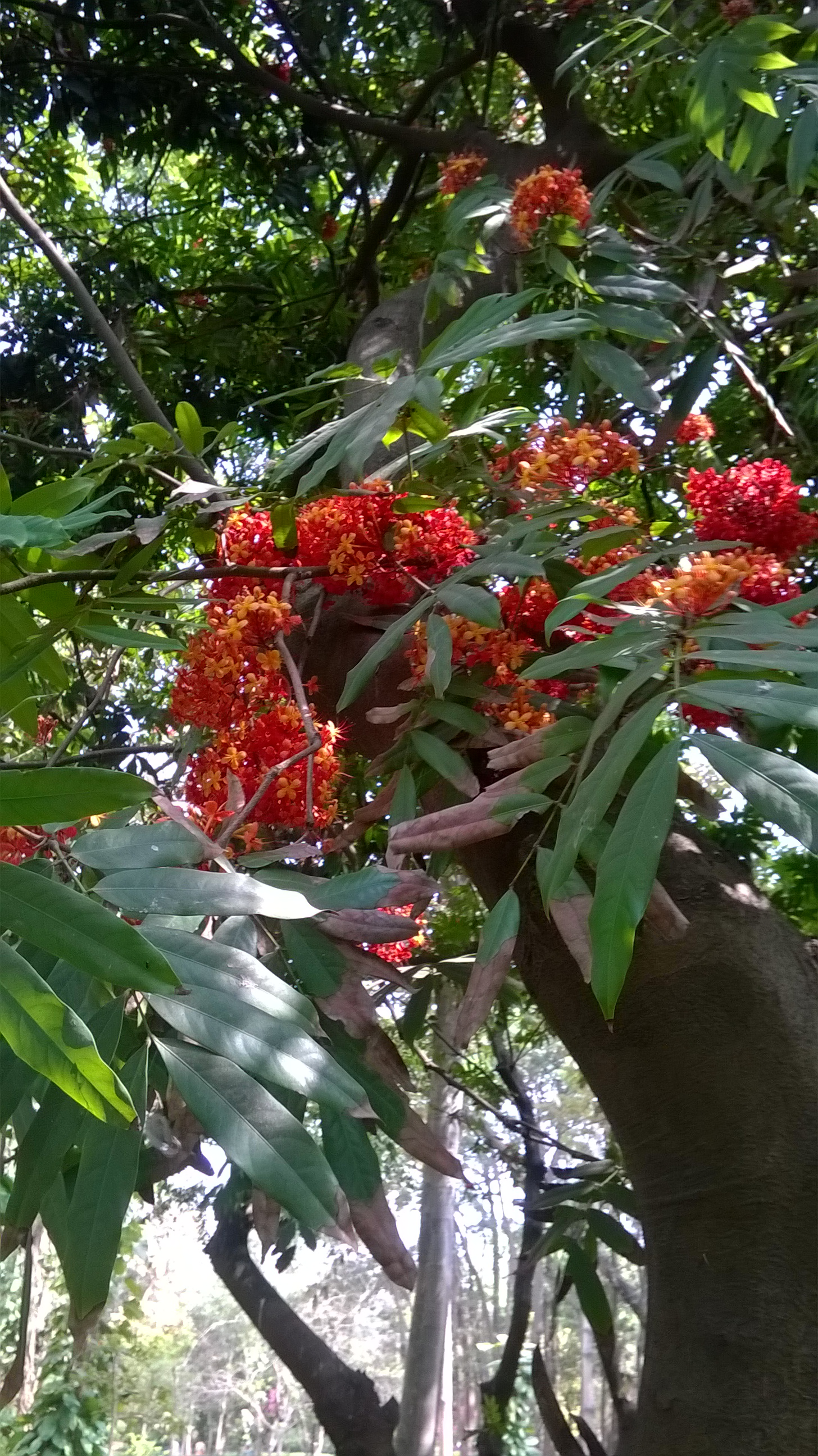
Sita Ashoka

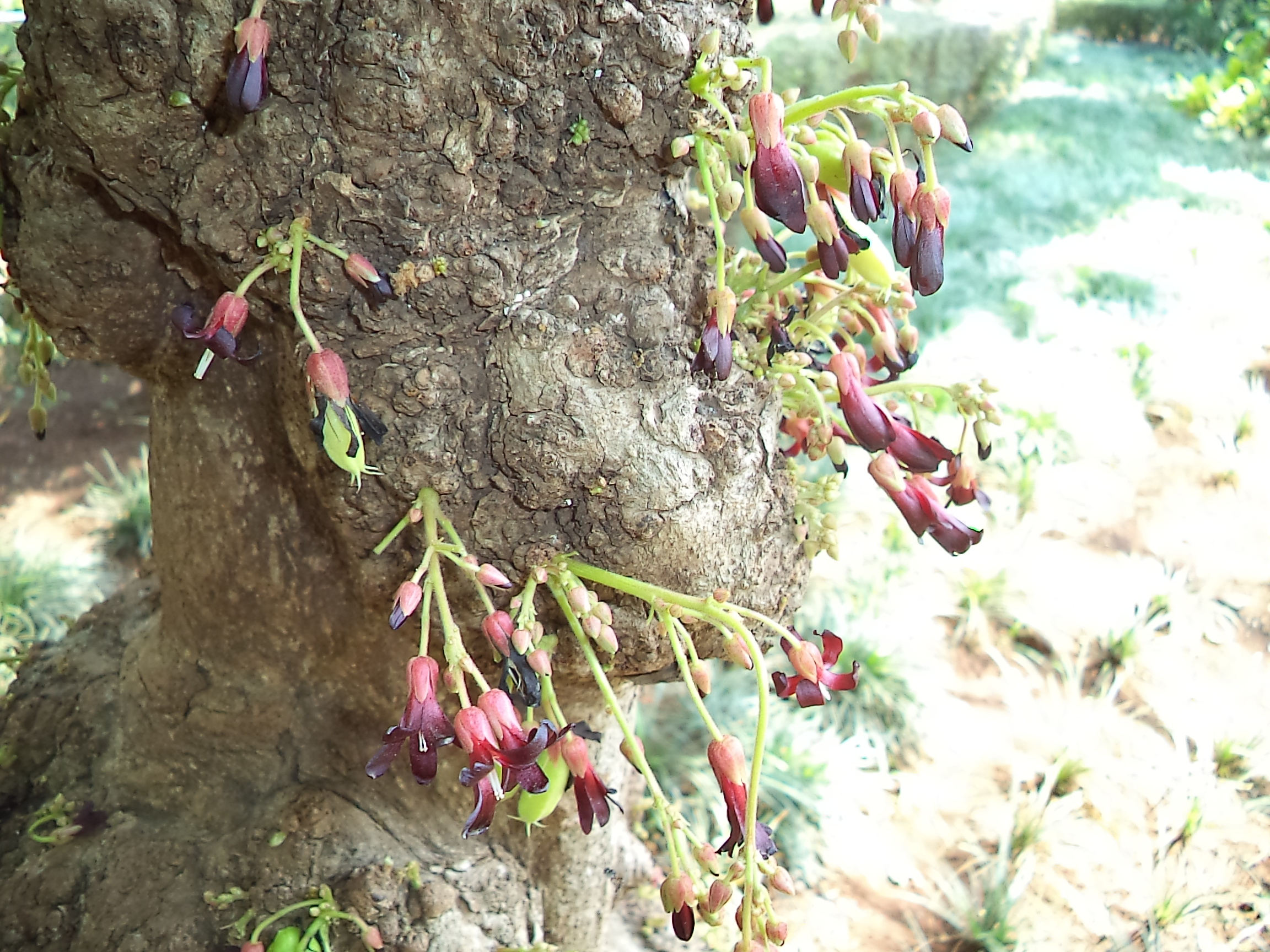
Bilimbi

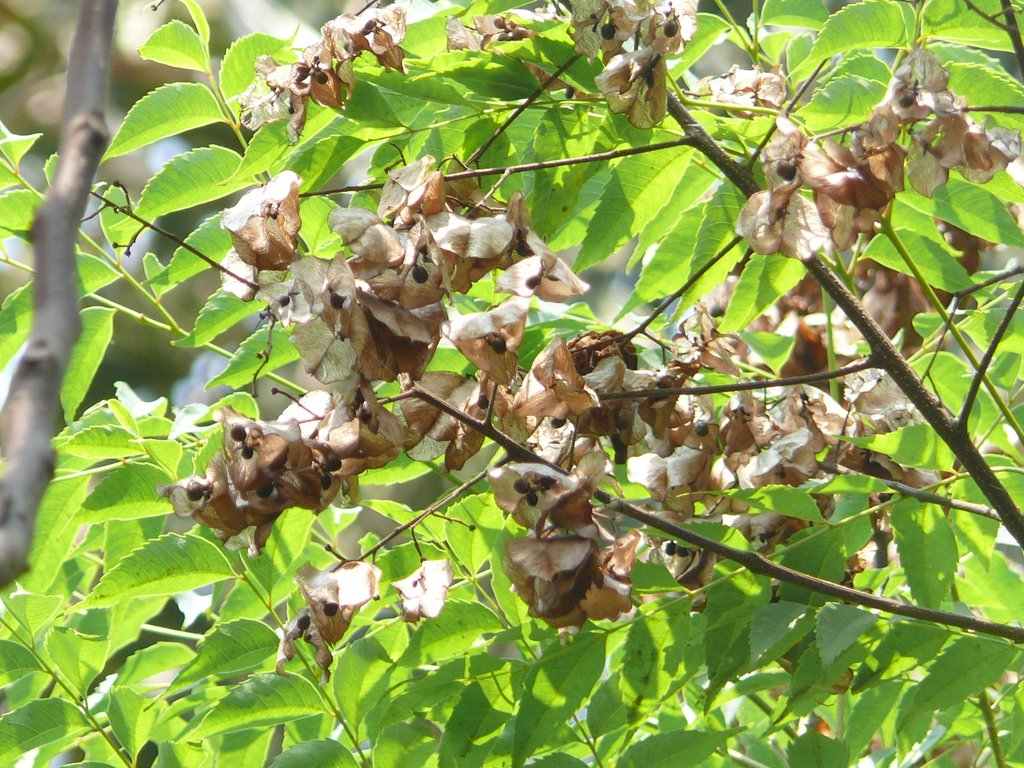
Koelreuteria
