= Afghan Church =

Anglican church in Mumbai, India

Coordinates: 18.903648°N 72.815076°E

- Church of St. John the Evangelist
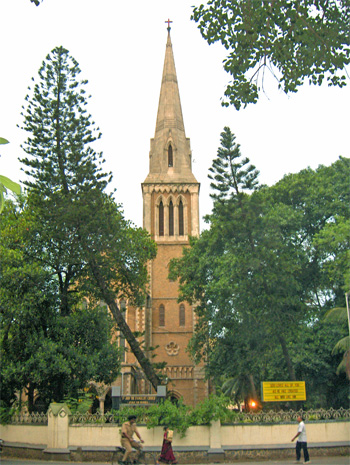
- Front view of the church c. 2005
- Afghan Church
- Location: Navy Nagar, Colaba, Mumbai, Maharashtra
- Country: India
- Denomination: Anglican

History
- Founded: 1847
- Founder: The Rev G. Piggot
- Dedication: St John the Evangelist
- Consecrated: 7 January 1858

Architecture
- Architectural type: Gothic Revival
- Groundbreaking: 4 December 1847

Administration
- Diocese: Diocese of Mumbai

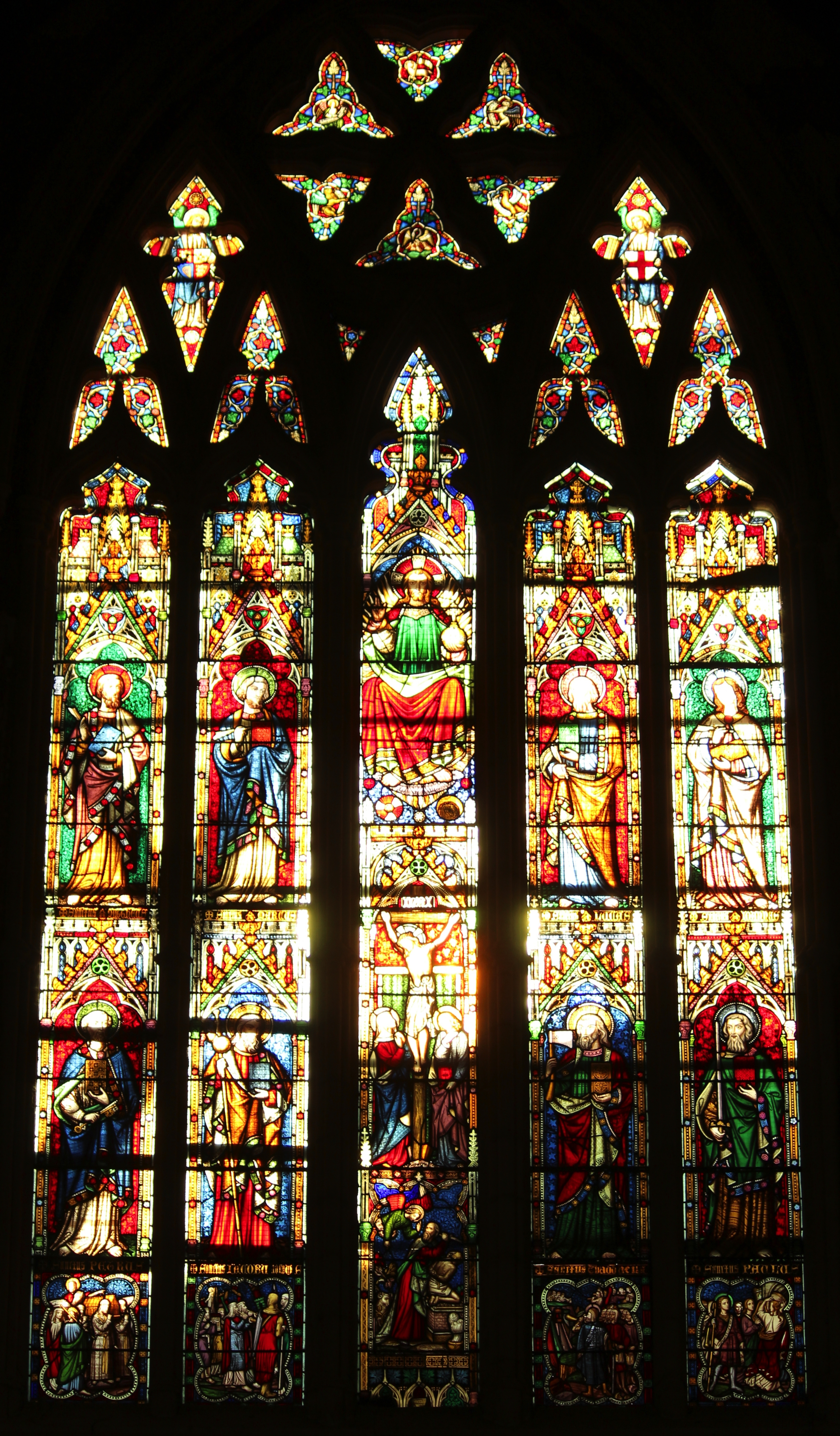
Stained glass window inside the church

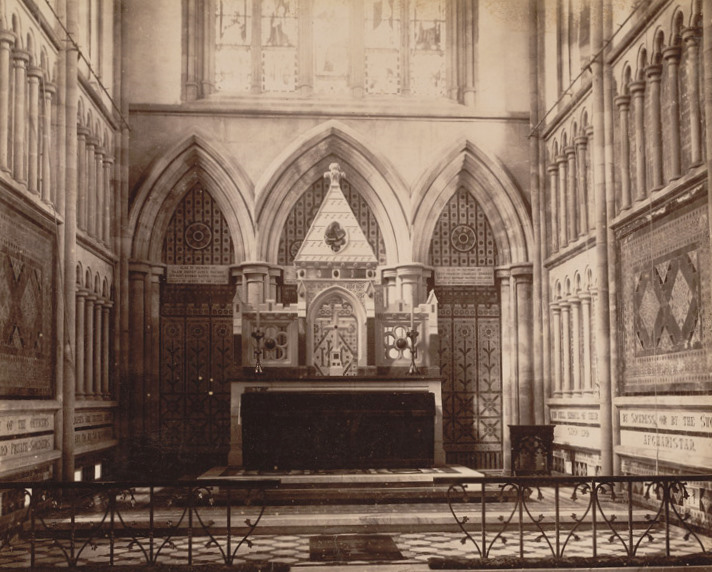
East end of the church, c. 1880-90

The Church of St John the Evangelist, better known as the Afghan Church, is an Anglican church belonging to the Mumbai diocese of the Church of North India. Located in Mumbai, Maharashtra, India, it was built by the British between 1847 and 1858 to commemorate the dead of the First Afghan War and the disastrous 1842 retreat from Kabul. Memorials at the rear of the nave also record casualties from the Second Anglo-Afghan War. The foundation stone was laid in 1847; it was consecrated in 1858, and work on the steeple finished in 1865.

The church is located in Navy Nagar in the Colaba area of South Mumbai. It was designed by Henry Conybeare; architect William Butterfield was responsible for reredos, tiles, pews and screen; and the stained glass was by William Wailes. In 2018, it was reported there are some 64 historic stained glass panels in the church in urgent need of restoration.

== History ==
The first Anglican church in the Navy Nagar district began as a small thatched chapel a kilometre south in what was then known as the "Sick Bungalows" . There were no chairs, and patrons had to bring their own. Later, the government released a new patch of land for the setting up the church with the hope that the church's spire would serve as a useful landmark for ships in the harbour.

The construction of a new more permanent church in the 1840s was led by the Rev. George Pigott, Chaplain to the East India Company in Bombay. The immediate impetus for fundraising and construction was for the church to serve as the principal memorial to the casualties of the First Anglo-Afghan War. The Rev. Pigott had previously served as chaplain to the Bombay Army as troops advanced on Kabul in 1838 under the direction of Lord Keane. The subsequent retreat of the British forces from Kabul in 1842 was described at the time as the worst disaster suffered by the British in India. Many of the casualties of the conflict came from the East India Company's Bombay Army and military establishments located in proximity to the present church site.

In March 1843, the Oxford Society for Promoting the Study of Gothic Architecture (later the Oxford Architectural and Historical Society) received a request from the Rev. Piggot asking for a design for the new church. The English architect John Macduff Derick presented his designs to the Society in November of the same year, and they met with the Society's approval. However, in June 1845 word came from India that the designs were unfit for the purpose and the building would cost too much. Eventually, plans for the quintessentially English Gothic Revival architecture of the church were submitted in 1847 by city engineer Henry Conybeare and approved.

The foundation stone of the church was laid on 4 December 1847 by Sir George Russell Clerk, Governor. When Conybeare stood down as town engineer in 1850, Captain C.W. Tremenheere of the Royal Engineers took on the role of superintending architect modifying certain aspects of the approved design such as reducing the pitch of the roof and height of the tower. Architect William Butterfield in conjunction with students from the Sir Jamsetjee Jeejeebhoy School of Art designed the decorative tile reredos. The Afghan War Memorial mosaics, the polychrome floor tiles, choir stalls, screen and pews were also produced to Butterfield's designs. The church was consecrated on 7 January 1858, by Bishop of Bombay, John Harding. The spire cost a sum of Rs 5,65,000 and was finished on 10 June 1865. Sir Cowasji Jehangir contributed a sum of Rs 7,500 to help complete the building.

== Architecture ==
The imposing edifice was constructed using locally available buff-coloured basalt and limestone. Inside, it is known for its wide gothic arches and beautiful stained glass windows. The chapel has a nave and aisle with a chancel 50 ft (15 m) in length and 27 ft (7 m) in width. Butterfield's tiles used for the geometric floor pattern were imported from England. The east and west windows were designed by William Wailes, a nineteenth-century stained glass expert. Eight large bells in the bell tower came from the Taylor bellfoundry of England in 1904, and are acknowledged to be the best in western India. The tower and spire are 198 ft (60 m) high.

In the chancel a marble inscription reads:

"This church was built in memory of the officers whose names are written on the walls of the chancel and of the non-commissioned officers and private soldiers, too many to be so recorded who fell, mindful of their duty, by sickness or by sword in the campaigns of Sind and Afghanistan, A.D. 1838-1843."

Another brass panel set in the chancel commemorates its founder, Rev. G. Piggot, who died 24 February 1850.

== Present day ==
After years of neglect, the government elevated the church to a Grade I heritage structure.

The Prince of Wales and the Duchess of Cornwall attended a Remembrance Sunday service at the church on 10 November 2013.

The church holds regular weekly services with a small congregation mainly drawn from Navy Nagar residents. Visitors may obtain access to view the historic church interior from the on-site custodian.

== Gallery ==
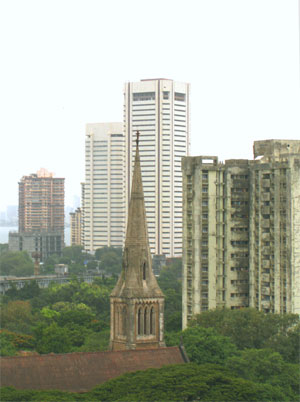
The church spire.

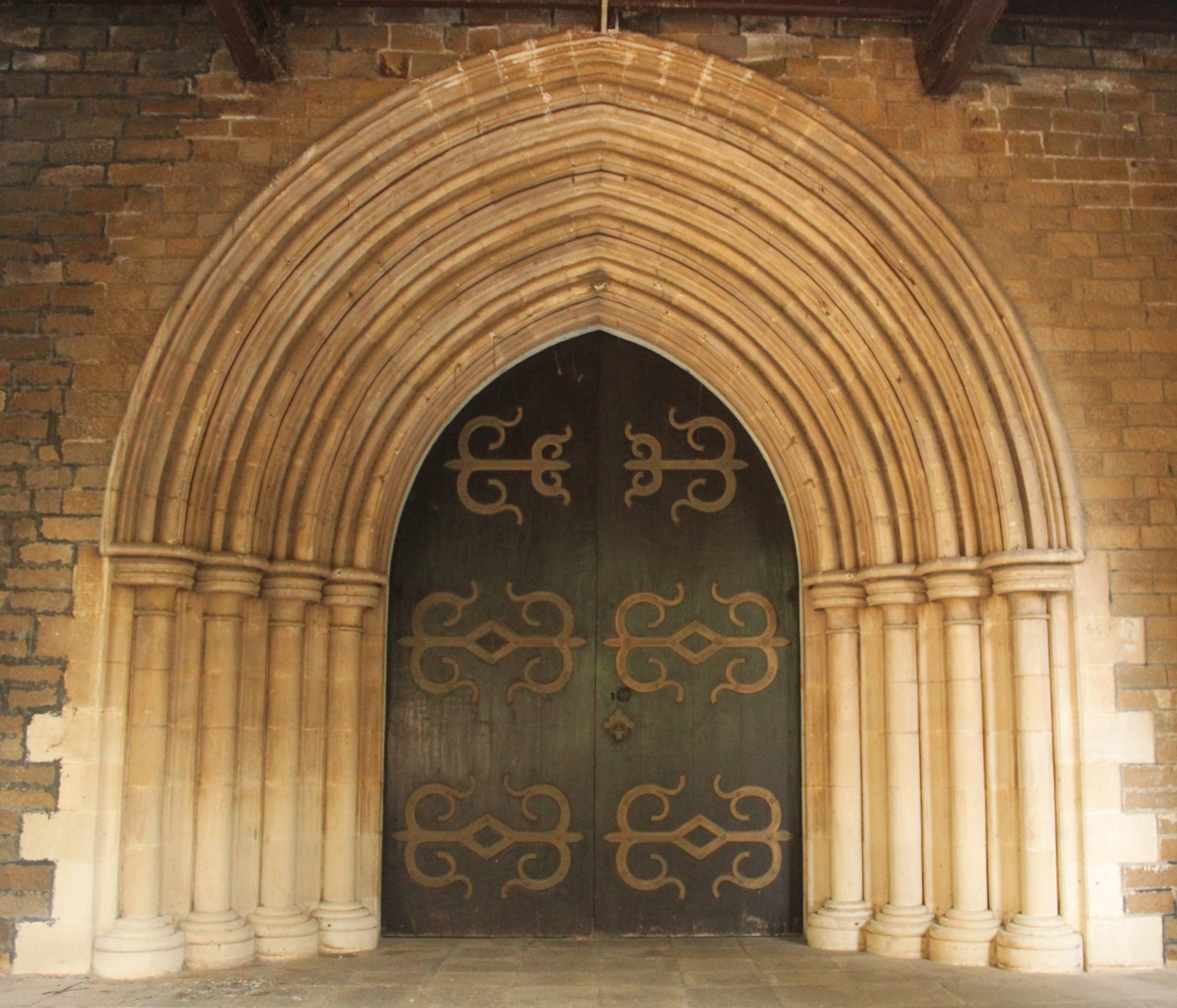
Doorway to the church.

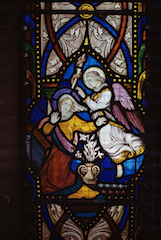
Stained Glass Window at Afghan Church, Mumbai, India

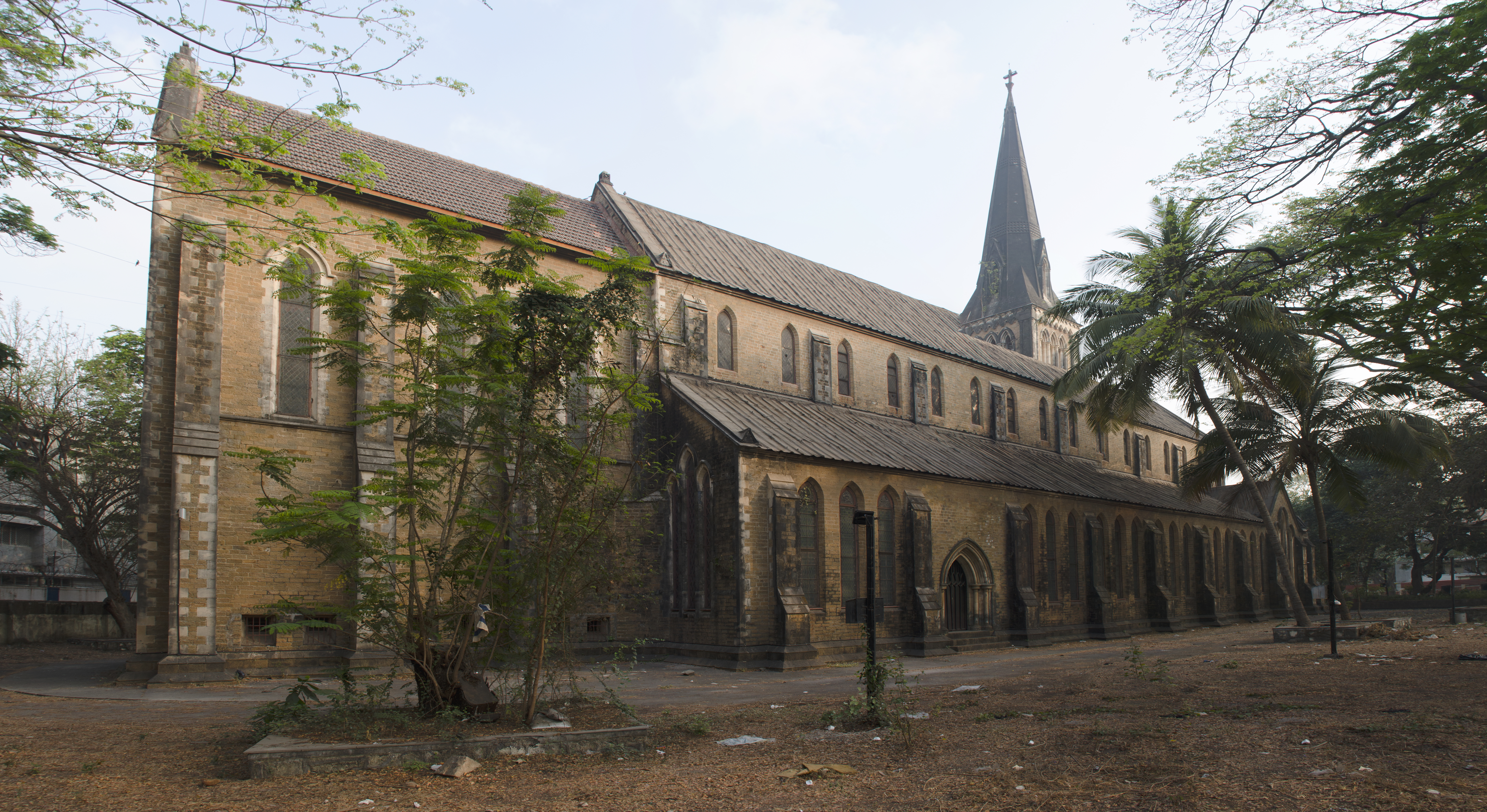
