= Mughal Museum =

Museum in India

The Chhatrapati Shivaji Maharaj Museum
- Established: Under construction
- Location: Agra, Uttar Pradesh, India
- Coordinates: 18.9269°N 72.8327°E
- Type: Planned museum
- Founder: Akhilesh Yadav
- Manager: Yogi Adityanath
- Owner: Government of Uttar Pradesh

The Chhatrapati Shivaji Maharaj Museum, previously known as Mughal Museum, is a museum planned to be built in the city of Agra, India. The museum was announced by then-Chief Minister of Uttar Pradesh, Akhilesh Yadav in 2015, and construction began in 2017. As of September 2020, the museum is still under construction. In September 2020 Uttar Pradesh Chief Minister Yogi Adityanath renamed the Mughal Museum after the Maratha king Shivaji.
