= Indian Institute of Geomagnetism =

Autonomous research institution in India

Indian Institute of Geomagnetism, Mumbai
- Type: Research Institution
- Established: 1826; 200 years ago (as Colaba Observatory); 1971; 55 years ago (as IIG)
- Director: A. P. Dimri
- Location: Mumbai, Maharashtra, India; 19.0137447°N 73.1036154°E
- Campus: Urban
- Website: http://www.iigm.res.in

The Indian Institute of Geomagnetism is an autonomous research institution established by the Government of India's Department of Science and Technology. The facility is engaged in basic and applied research in geomagnetism, as well as allied areas of geophysics, atmospheric physics and space physics, as well as plasma physics. The institute currently operates 12 magnetic observatories and actively participates in the Indian Antarctic Program.

== History ==
The institute was developed as a successor of Colaba Observatory in 1971. The original Observatory was founded in 1826. Its first Director was B. N. Bhargava, appointed in 1971, and held this title until 1979.

== Research ==
- Upper Atmosphere
- Solid Earth
- Observatory and Data Analysis
- Antarctica

The institute has collaborated with Kyoto University in Japan, the University of the Western Cape in South Africa, and the National Science Council in Taiwan. It established a World Data Center for the topic of Geomagnetism that maintains comprehensive sets of analog and digital geomagnetic data, as well as indices of geomagnetic activity supplied from a worldwide network of magnetic observatories.

== Centers and Observatories ==
=== Location of Regional Laboratories ===
- Equatorial Geophysical Research Laboratory, (EGRL), Tirunelveli
- K.S. Krishnan Geomagnetic Research Laboratory, (KSKGRL), Allahabad
- NORTH EAST Geophysical Research Laboratory, (NEGRL), Shillong

=== Location of Magnetic Observatories ===
- Alibag
- Allahabad
- Gulmarg
- Jaipur
- Nagpur
- Pondicherry
- Port Blair
- Rajkot
- Shillong
- Silchar
- Tirunelveli
- Visakhapatnam
