= Cotton Green =

- Neighbourhood
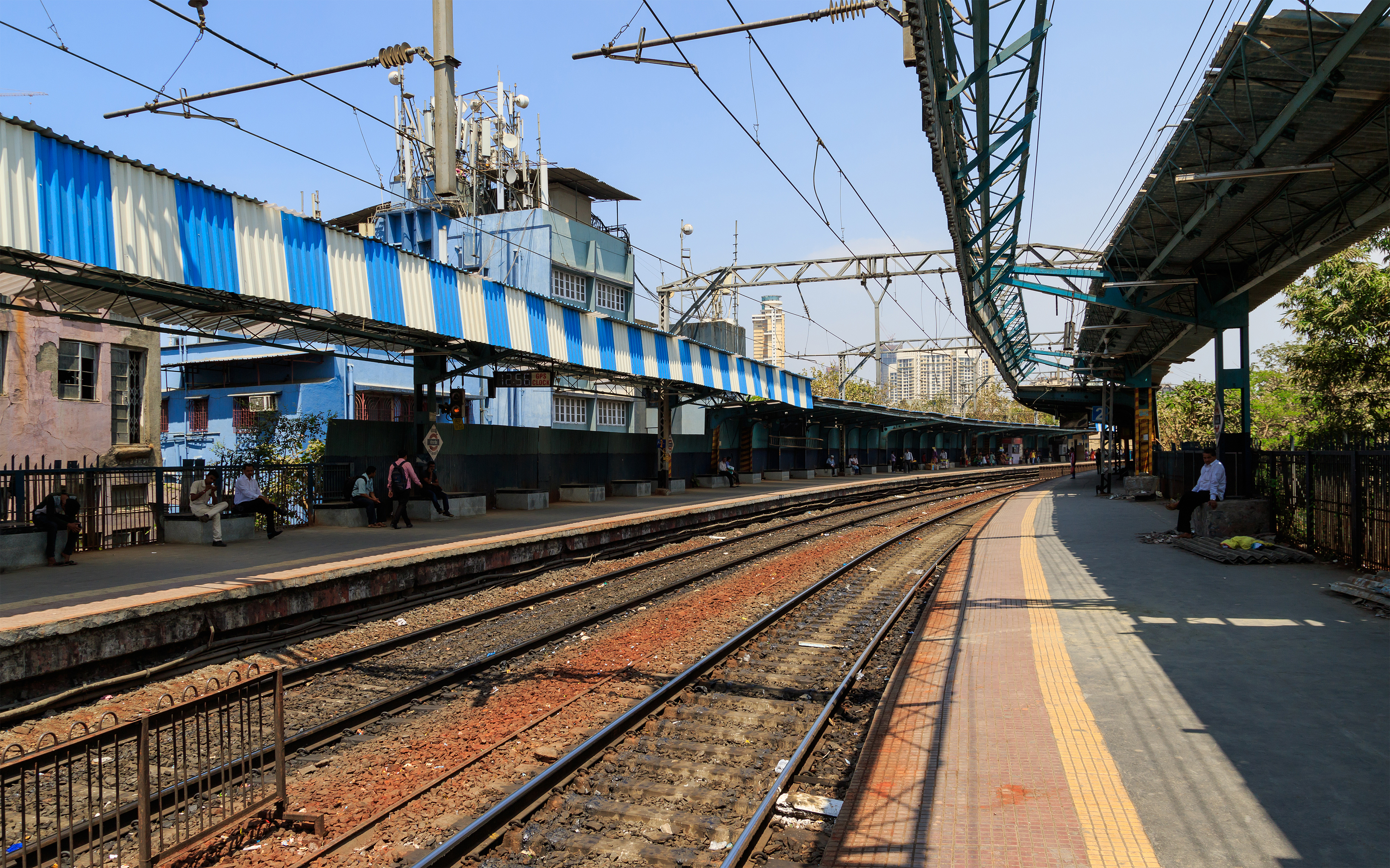
- Cotton Green Railway Station

- Location within Mumbai
- Coordinates: 18.986209°N 72.844076°E
- Country: India
- State: Maharashtra
- Metro: Mumbai

Languages
  - Official: Marathi
- Time zone: UTC+5:30 (IST)
- PIN: 400033
- Area code: 022
- Vehicle registration: MH 01
- Civic agency: BMC

Cotton Green is a suburb of Mumbai, and a noted residential and commercial area east of Parel, in central Mumbai, 8 km north of Colaba. It is also the name of a railway station on the Mumbai suburban railway, which lies along the Harbour line, which is a part of the Central Railway.

There was an earlier Cotton Green in Colaba that is marked in old maps. That location is now part of Badhwar Park. Cotton was shipped from this location as recently as 1910.

== Etymology ==
The station is named Cotton Green after an Art Deco building of the "Cotton Exchange" and a series of warehouses. The older Cotton Green in Colaba was thus named because it was in a village green and housed the original cotton exchange.

One more possibility is as follows. The station is named Cotton Green after an Art Deco building of the "Cotton Exchange" and a series of warehouses. The older Cotton Green in Colaba was thus named because it was in a village green and housed the original cotton exchange. In the 18th century the area around the only English church (Today's St. Thomas Church at Fort, Bombay (Mumbai)) was situated on what is called as the Green, a spacious area that continued from the Fort thereto, and was pleasantly laid out in walks planted with trees. The area was naturally called ‘Bombay Green’. Due to the area's proximity to the docks and the piled bales of Cotton for trade thereat, it came to be referred as ‘Cotton Green’. In 1844, cotton trade was shifted from this area to further south at Colaba. The new locality came to be called rather predictably as ‘New Cotton Green’. Subsequently, due to further remodeling and reclamation, the cotton trade at ‘New Cotton Green’ was shifted to ‘Sewri-Mazgaon’ reclamation area, where a spacious Cotton Exchange Building was also built. The Rail Station opposite this Cotton Exchange Building was for obvious reasons named "Cotton Green".

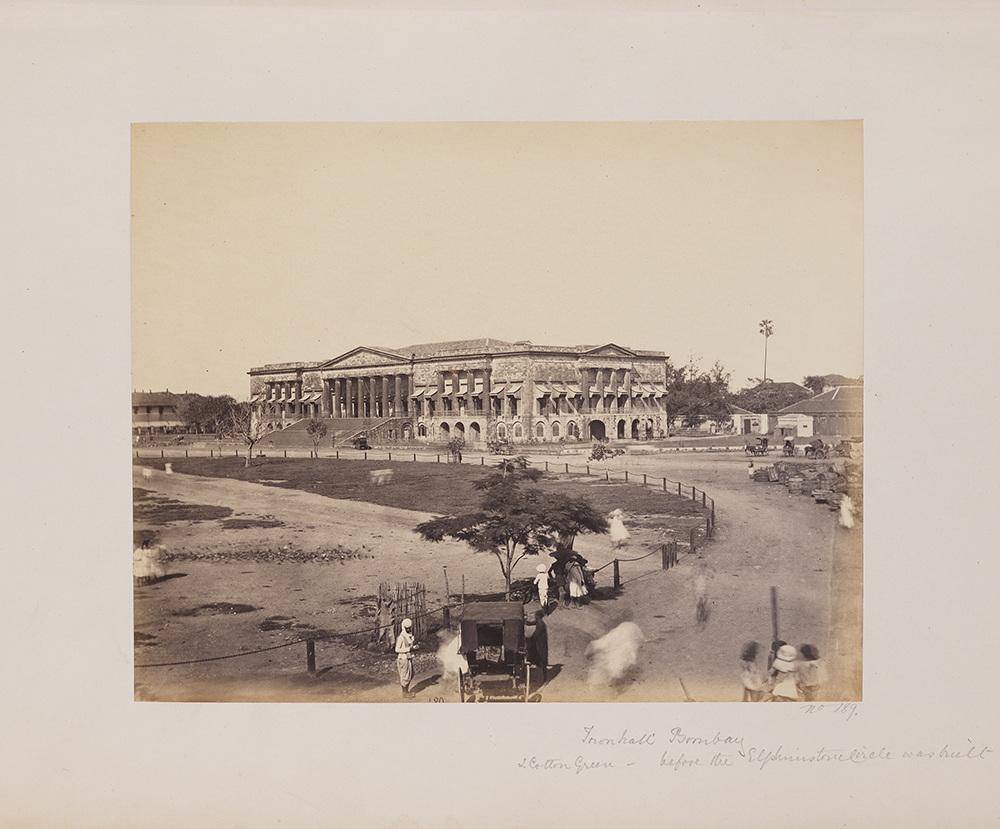
Town Hall Bombay & Cotton Green - before Elphinstone Circle was built, 1855-1862
