= History of Bombay under Portuguese rule (1534–1661) =

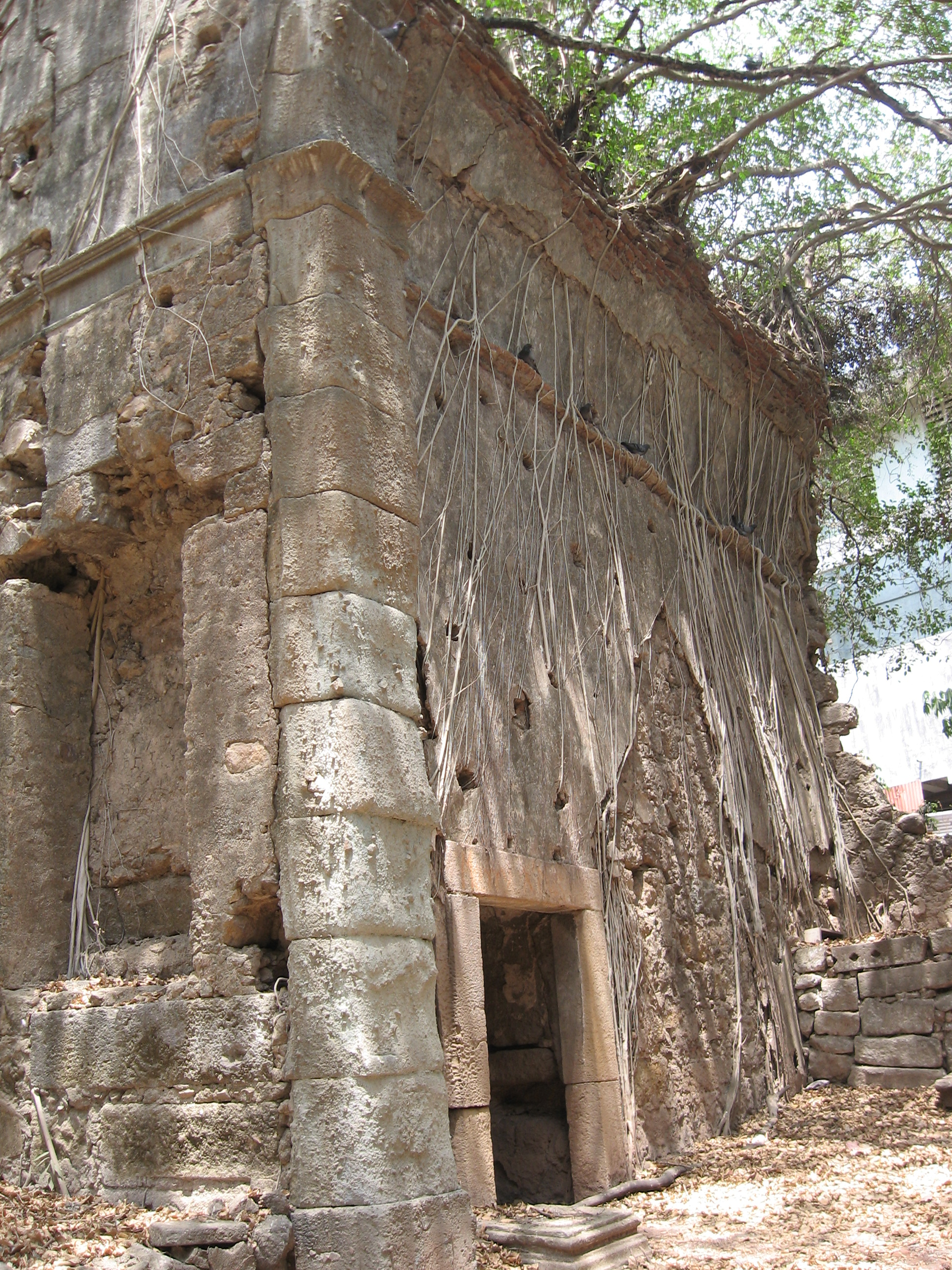
Ruins of St. John the Baptist Church in Andheri, built by the Portuguese Jesuits in 1579.

Bombay, also called Bom Bahia or Bom Baim in Indo-Portuguese creole, and Mumbai in the local language; is the financial and commercial capital of India and one of the most populous cities in the world. It's also the cosmopolitan city centre of the Greater Bombay Metropolitan Area, and the cultural base of the Bollywood film industry. At the time of the arrival of the Portuguese Armadas, Bombay was an archipelago of seven islands. Between the third century BCE and 1348, the islands came under the control of successive Hindu dynasties. The Delhi Sultanate had been ruling the area, along with Chaul, New Bombay, (Thana), and Damaon; with the local administration at Bassein (Vasai) since the raids of Malik Kafur in the Konkan region and across the Indian subcontinent. This territory in North Konkan, along with the Bombay islands were later taken over by the Sultan of Guzerat from 1391 to 1534, when he had declared the end of his suzerainty to Delhi, after the Timurid invasion of it. Growing apprehensive of the power of the Moghal emperor Humayun, Sultan Bahadur Shah of Gujarat was obliged to sign the Treaty of Bassein on 23 December 1534; according to which, the Seven Islands of Bombay, Fort San Sebastian of Bassein in the strategic town of Bassein (Vasai), and its dependencies were offered to the Portuguese East Indies. The places were only later officially surrendered on 25 October 1535, by the Sultan of Guzerat.

The Portuguese in Goa-Anjediva and Bombay-Bassein were actively involved in the foundation and growth of their Latin Christian religion in Bombay and the neighbouring area. They called the island by various names, which finally took the written form Bom Baim, when the islands were leased to several Portuguese officers during their regime. Portuguese Franciscans and Jesuits built several churches in and around Bombay (Mumbai); the prominent ones are the St. Michael's Church at Mahim, St. John the Baptist Church at Andheri, St. Andrew's Church, the Basilica of Mount Bandra (Bombay) at Bandra, the Gloria Church at Byculla, & the Holy Spirit Church Nandakhal at Virar. The Portuguese also built several fortifications around the city, like the Bombay Castle, Castella de Aguada (Castelo da Aguada or Bandra Fort) and Madh Fort.

The Marriage Treaty of Charles II of England and Catherine de Braganza, daughter of John IV of Portugal was proposed on 23 June, 1661. According to the treaty, the Seven Islands of Bombay along with the port of Tangiers were to be presented to the English Crown. It also granted the English trading privileges in Brazil and the Portuguese East Indies, religious freedom for English residents in Portugal, and two million Portuguese crowns (£300,000), as parts of the dowry of Catherine to Charles, the contract was ratified on 28 August, 1661, and the marriage took place on 31 May, 1662. After their marriage, the Portuguese viceroy in Goa retained control of Salsette island (Bombay Suburban district), New Bombay & Bassein (Vasai) of the pre-partition Thana district until the Mahratta Invasion of Bassein in 1739.

The Seven Islands of Bombay were regarded as a political and financial liability and were leased by Charles, to the English East India Company, on 27 March 1668, for a nominal £10 rent, as a station in western India, to compete with Dutch East Indies.

The East India company was initially at odds with the Portuguese viceroy and vying for hegemony over the seven islands of what would become the capital city of the British Bombay Presidency, as both the English and the Portuguese recognised Bombay Harbour's strategic isolation from land-based attacks such as the sack of Surat and the sackings of Goa-Anjediva and Bombay-Bassein. The viceroy at Goa disobeyed the Portuguese crown and delayed a complete handover of the seven islands. Hence, even after the treaty some villages in the seven islands of Bombay remained under the capital of Velha Goa, only later were the islands fully acquired by the English East India Company after the Battle of Bassein in 1739.

== Arrival of the Portuguese ==
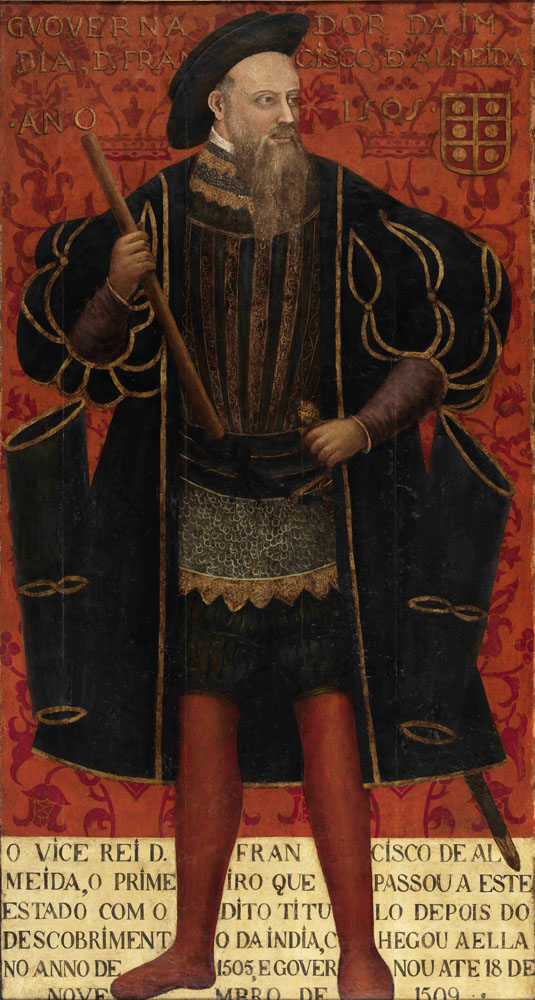
Francisco de Almeida was the first Portuguese soldier to sail through Bombay Harbour in 1508.

From the third century BCE to 1534, the islands had been under the control of the following dynasties in succession: Mauryas (3rd century BCE – around 185 BCE), Satavahanas (Around 185 BCE – 250 CE), Abhiras and Vakatakas (250 CE – early 5th century), Kalachuris (5th century), Konkan Mauryas (6th and early 7th century), Chalukyas (later 7th century), Rashtrakutas (mid-8th century), Silharas (810 to 1260), Yadavas (late 13th century – 1348), Muslim rulers of Gujarat (1348–1391), and the Gujarat Sultanate (1391–1534). At the time of arrival of the Portuguese, Bombay was ruled by Sultan Bahadur Shah of the Gujarat Sultanate, and was an archipelago of seven islands: Bombay Island (Bombaim), Parel, Mazagaon, Mahim, Colaba, Worli, and Old Woman's Island (also known as Little Colaba). The Salsette group of islands were located east of Bombay, separated by the Mahim Bay. Important strategic towns located near Bombay were Bassein (Baçaim) to the north, Thana to the east, and Chaul to the south.

The Portuguese first reached the west coast of India when the Portuguese explorer Vasco da Gama landed at Calicut in 1498. For several years after their arrival in India, they had been consolidating their power in north Konkan. They had established a strong foothold in Goa, which they captured from the Sultan of Bijapur in 1510. Portuguese explorer Francisco de Almeida's ship sailed into the deep natural harbour of Bombay in December 1508 on his expedition from Cannanore to Diu. The Portuguese paid their first visit to the islands on 21 January 1509, when they landed at Mahim after capturing a barge of the Gujarat Sultanate in the Mahim creek. Between 1513 and 1514, they requested Sultan Bahadur Shah to allow them build a fortress at Mahim. In 1517, during the viceroyalty of Lopo Soares de Albergaria (1515–18), João de Monroyo entered the Bandora creek (Bandra creek) and defeated the Gujarat commandant of Mahim. Between 1522 and 1524, when Duarte de Menezes was viceroy of Goa, the Portuguese were constantly prowling about Bombay for the ships of the Gujarat Sultanate.

In 1526, the Portuguese established their factory at Bassein. During 1528–29, Lopo Vaz de Sampaio seized the fort of Mahim from the Gujarat Sultanate, when Sultan Bahadur Shah was at war with Nizam-ul-mulk, the emperor of Chaul. Bombay came into prominence in connection with the attempt of the Portuguese to capture Diu in 1530–31. Nuno da Cunha, the viceroy of Goa, commanded the largest fleet seen in India, which passed through Bombay Harbour. In March–April 1531, the Portuguese torched the towns of Thana and Mahim. In consequence of this success, and later of Nuno da Cunha's capture of Bassein in January 1533, the islands of Bombay and Mahim, together with Bandra, became tributary to the Portuguese.

== Accession of the islands to the Portuguese ==
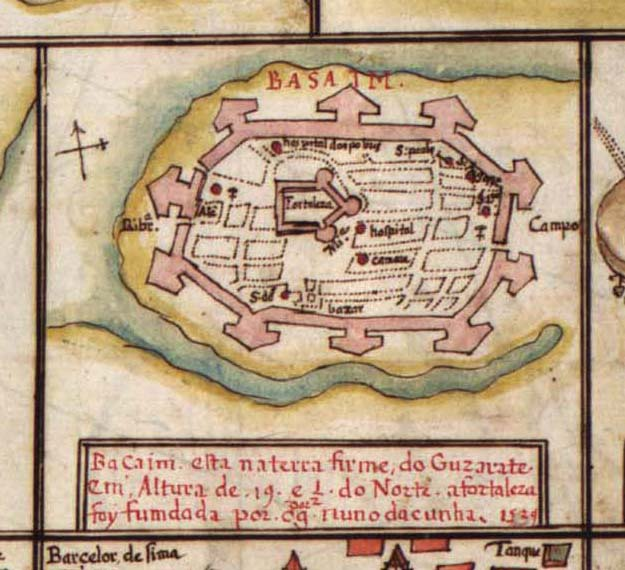
Map of Bassein (c. 1539), built by order of Nuno da Cunha, Governor of Goa (1528–38)

The Mughal Empire, founded in 1526, was the dominant power in the Indian subcontinent during the mid-16th century. The dynasty was founded when Babur, hailing from Ferghana (in modern-day Uzbekistan), invaded parts of North India and defeated Ibrahim Shah Lodhi, the ruler of Delhi Sultanate, at the First Battle of Panipat in 1526. After Babur's death on 26 December 1530, his son Humayun (1530–40) ascended to the throne at Agra on 29 December 1530.

Sultan Bahadur Shah had grown apprehensive of the power of Humayun. He dispatched his chief officer Xacoes (Shah Khawjeh) to Nuno da Cunha with an offer to hand over the seven islands of Bombay together with Bassein, its dependencies, and revenues by sea and land. On 23 December 1534, the Treaty of Bassein was signed on board the galleon San Mateos (St. Matthew). Bassein and the seven islands of Bombay were surrendered later by a treaty of peace and commerce between Bahadur Shah and Nuno da Cunha on 25 October 1535, permanently ending the Islamic rule on the islands.

== Development of islands ==
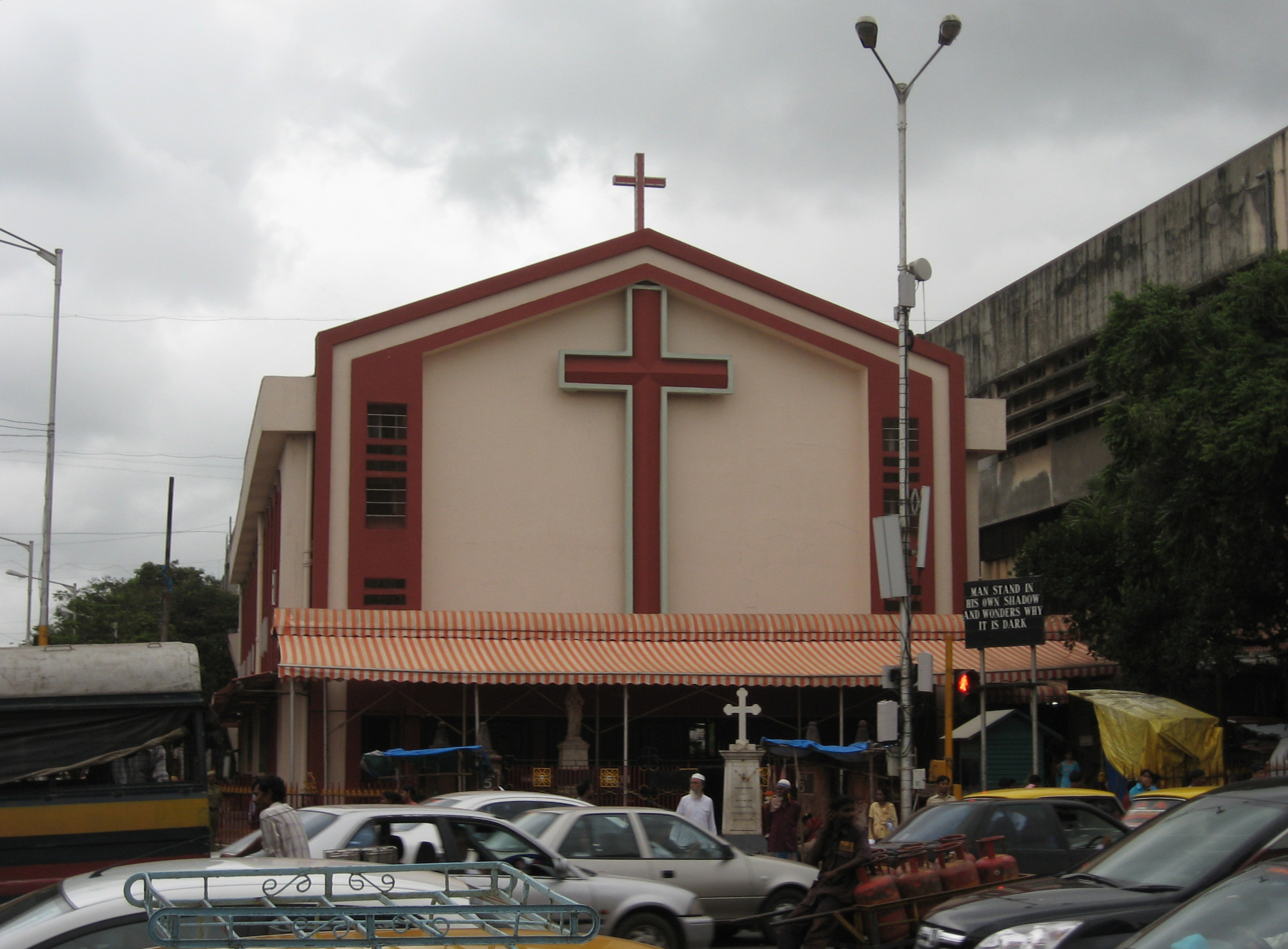
St. Michael's Church in Mahim, the oldest Portuguese Franciscan church in Bombay, was built in 1534.

In the general distribution of estates which occurred after 1534, Bombay Island was leased to Mestre Diogo for an annual rent of 1,432½ pardaos (about Rs. 537-3-0), payable at the royal treasury in Bassein. Mahim was similarly rented for 36,057 foedeas (Rs. 751-3-0), the custom house of Mahim for 39,975 foedeas (Rs. 791-2-9), and Mazagon for 8,500 foedeas (Rs. 178). The San Miguel (St. Michael's Church) in Mahim, the oldest Portuguese Franciscan church in Bombay, was built in 1534. Bombay was placed under the spiritual jurisdiction of the Vigario da Vara at Bassein. Under his auspices, the Franciscan Order was established. The Jesuit Order was established in 1542, the most notable member of which was the Navarrese Jesuit Francis Xavier. The Dominican Order established in Goa in 1545, was established in Bombay in 1548. After initially referring to it by the name Ilha da Boa Vida (Island of Good Life), the Portuguese called the islands by various names like Mombai, Mombay, Mombayn, Mombaym, and Bombai, which finally took the written form Bombaim, still common in current Portuguese use. After the British gained possession, it was believed to be anglicised to Bombay from the Portuguese Bombaim. Between 1545 and 1548, during the viceroyalty of João de Castro (1545-7), the four villages of Parel, Wadala, Sion, and Worli were granted to Manuel Serrão for an annual payment of 412 pardaos (Rs. 154-8-0). Salsette was granted for three years to João Rodrigues Dantas, Cosme Corres, and Manuel Corres. Trombay and Chembur were granted to Roque Tello de Menezes, and the Island of Pory (Elephanta Island) to João Pirez in 1548 for 105 pardaos (Rs. 39-6-0). The revenue of the custom house at Walkeshwar was granted to a Portuguese officer for 60 foedeas (Rs. 1-4-0). Mazagaon was granted to António Pessoa. In 1554, during the viceroyalty of Pedro Mascarenhas, the seven islands of Bombay were leased to Garcia de Orta, a Portuguese physician and botanist, for a yearly rent equivalent to about £85 sterling. Orta had fled Portugal to escape the trials of the Portuguese Inquisition, established in 1536, that kept an eye on Jewish families converted to Catholicism and severely persecuted them in case of real or imagined relapse on their former faith.

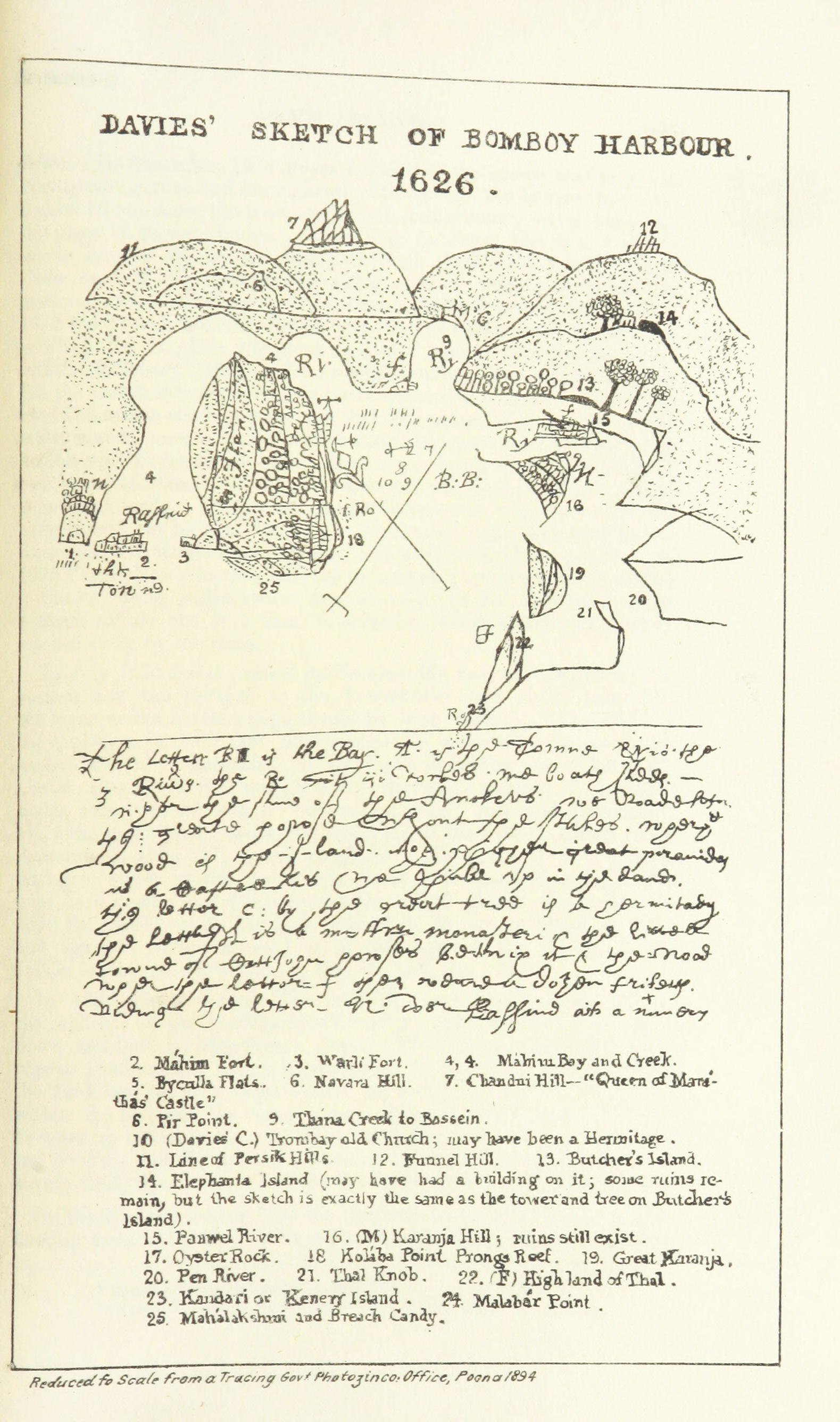
Davies' sketch of Bombay harbour, 1626

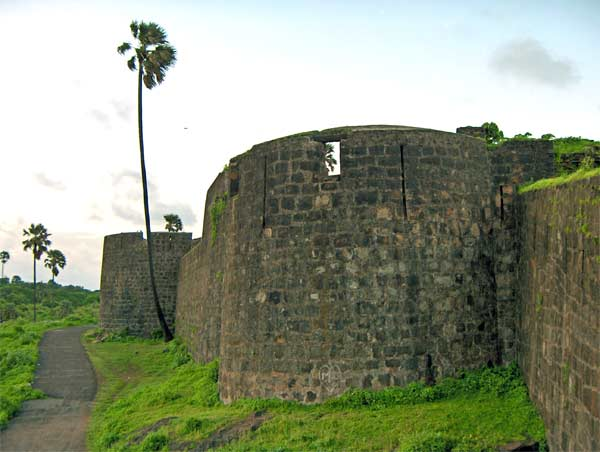
The Madh Fort, built by the Portuguese, was one of the most important forts in Salsette.

Garcia de Orta was responsible for building the manor-house (Bombay Castle) in Bombay.^{[a]} He also mentioned several accounts of the islands and the people living in Bombay during his time. During his regime, as regards the population of the island, Bombay was composed of seven Marathi Hindu populated villages subordinate to two cacabas (kashas) or chief stations, at which customs-duty was levied. These villages were Mahim, Parel, Varella (Wadala) and Syva (Sion) under the kasba (chief officer) of Mahim, and Mazagaon, Bombaim (Bombay), and Varel (Worli) under the kasba (chief officer) of Bombay. In addition to these, there were smaller hamlets like Cavel, Colaba, Naigaon and Dongri, which had existed from the epoch of indigenous Hindu settlement. The Kolis, a fishing community, formed the most numerous class of people, and dwelt in most parts of Bombay from Colaba in the south to Sion and Mahim in the north. Other Hindu communities residing were, the Kunbis and Agris (Curumbins) (who cultivated the fields and sowed them with rice and all sorts of pulse), the Malis (who tended the orchards), and the Piaes (men-at-arms) (who were Bhandaris). The Parus (Prabhus) dwelt in Mahim, Bombay, and Parel. They collected the rents of the King and of the inhabitants and their estates, and were also merchants. The Muslim Moors in Bombay were solely engaged in maritime trade. A few Muslims of less mixed descent were living in Mahim, but the bulk of the followers of Islam belonged to the Konkani Muslim community. Christians residing in Bombay during his time included eleven Roman Catholic Portuguese families of married men. The other three communities mentioned by Orta as residents in Bassein and its surrounding tracts were Baneanes (Banias), Coaris or Esparcis (Parsis), and Deres (Dheds or Mahars) or Farazes. Most Banias and Parsis did not actually settle in Bombay until after its cession to England by the Portuguese. Bombay apparently remained in Orta's possession until his peaceful death in Goa in 1570. Several years later, his bones were exhumed and burnt at the stake for his Jewish faith. The islands appears to have been granted on the same tenure to several Portuguese officials in succession.

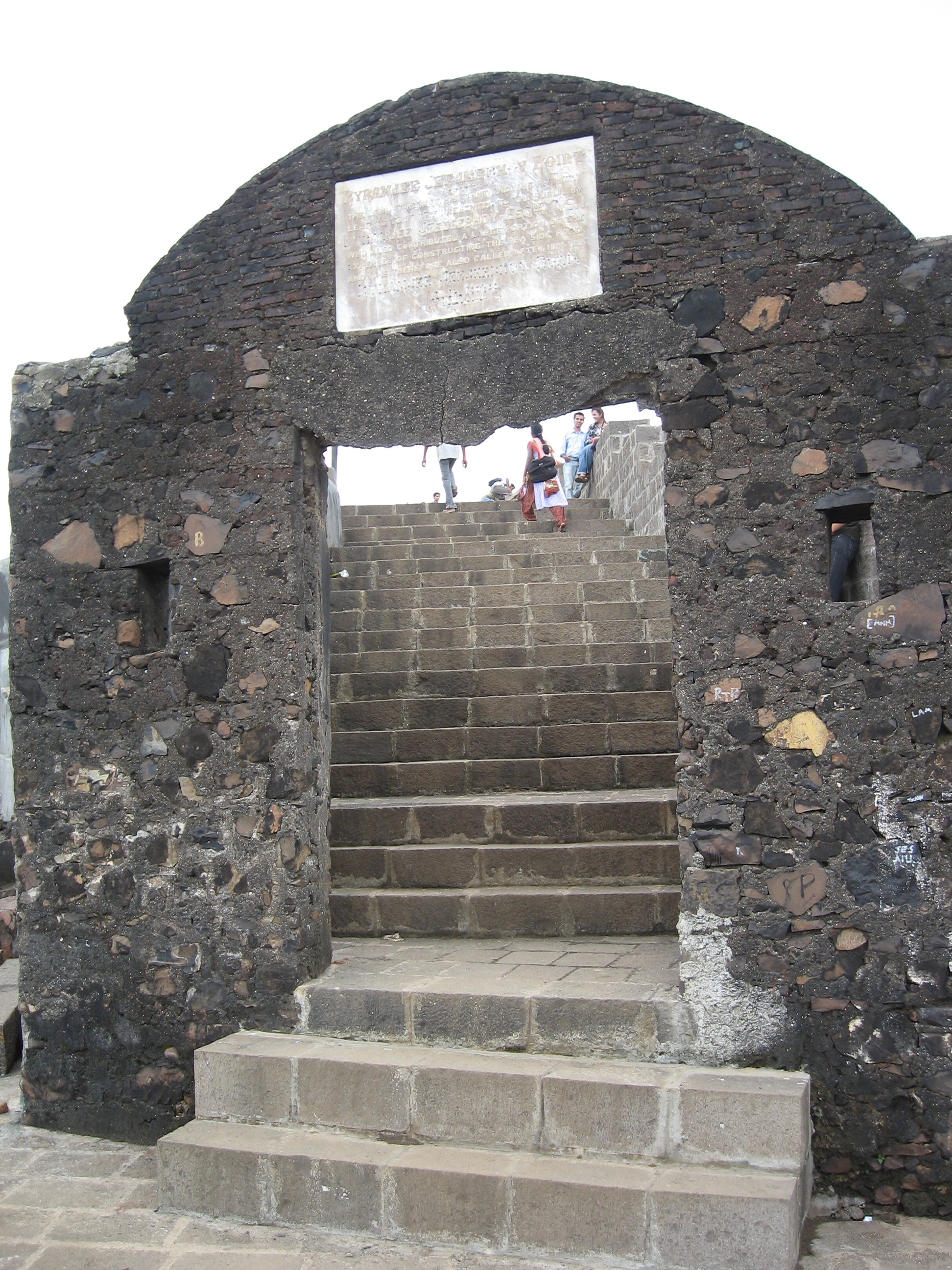
Castella de Aguada (Fort of the Waterpoint) was built by the Portuguese at Bandra in 1640.

The Portuguese encouraged intermarriage with the local population, and strongly supported the Roman Catholic Church. They converted nearly 10,000 natives to Christianity in Bassein, Thane, and neighbouring places. They started the Goa Inquisition in 1560. These people were referred as "Portuguese Christians". Later, named themselves as the East Indian Catholics (after the British East India Company) during the British regime because Goan and Mangalorean Catholic settlers in Bombay were also referred to as "Portuguese Christians" by British. After António Pessoa's death in 1571, a patent was issued which granted Mazagaon in perpetuity to the Sousa e Lima family. The St. Andrew Church at Bandra was built in 1575 by the Portuguese Jesuits. The union of the crowns of Portugal and Spain in 1580–1640 opened the way for other European powers to follow the spice routes to India. The Dutch arrived first, closely followed by the British. The Portuguese also built several fortifications around the city. The Madh Fort was one of their most important constructions in Salsette. The first English merchants arrived in Bombay in November 1583, and travelled through Bassein and Thana. A prominent merchant among them was Ralph Fitch from London. They mentioned that Bassein and Thana were trading in rice and corn on a small scale. They arrived in Chaul on 10 November 1583. During this time, Bombay's main trade was coconuts and coir. The Portuguese Franciscans had obtained practical control of Salsette and Mahim by 1585, and built Nossa Senhora do Bom Conselho (Our Lady of Good Advice, affiliated to igreja de São Miguel / St. Michael's Church in 1596) at Sion and Nossa Senhora da Salvação (Our Lady of Salvation, popularly referred as "Portuguese Church") at Dadar in 1596. The immense natural advantages of Bombay aroused the cupidity of the English who recognized its value as a naval base. In November 1612, the British fought the Battle of Swally with the Portuguese at Surat for the possession of Bombay. The British emerged victorious in the battle, and the Portuguese defeat was a significant event in marking the beginning of the end of their commercial monopoly over western India. Later, the British burnt the manor house built by Garcia de Orta in 1626. Dorabji Nanabhoy, a Gujarati trader, was the first Parsi to settle in Bombay in 1640. The Parsis immensely contributed towards the future development of Bombay during the British period. In 1640, the Portuguese built Castella da Aguada (Fort of the Waterpoint) at Bandra, as a watchtower overlooking the Mahim Bay, the Arabian Sea and the southern island of Mahim. It was armed with seven cannons and other smaller guns as defence.

== End of Portuguese rule ==
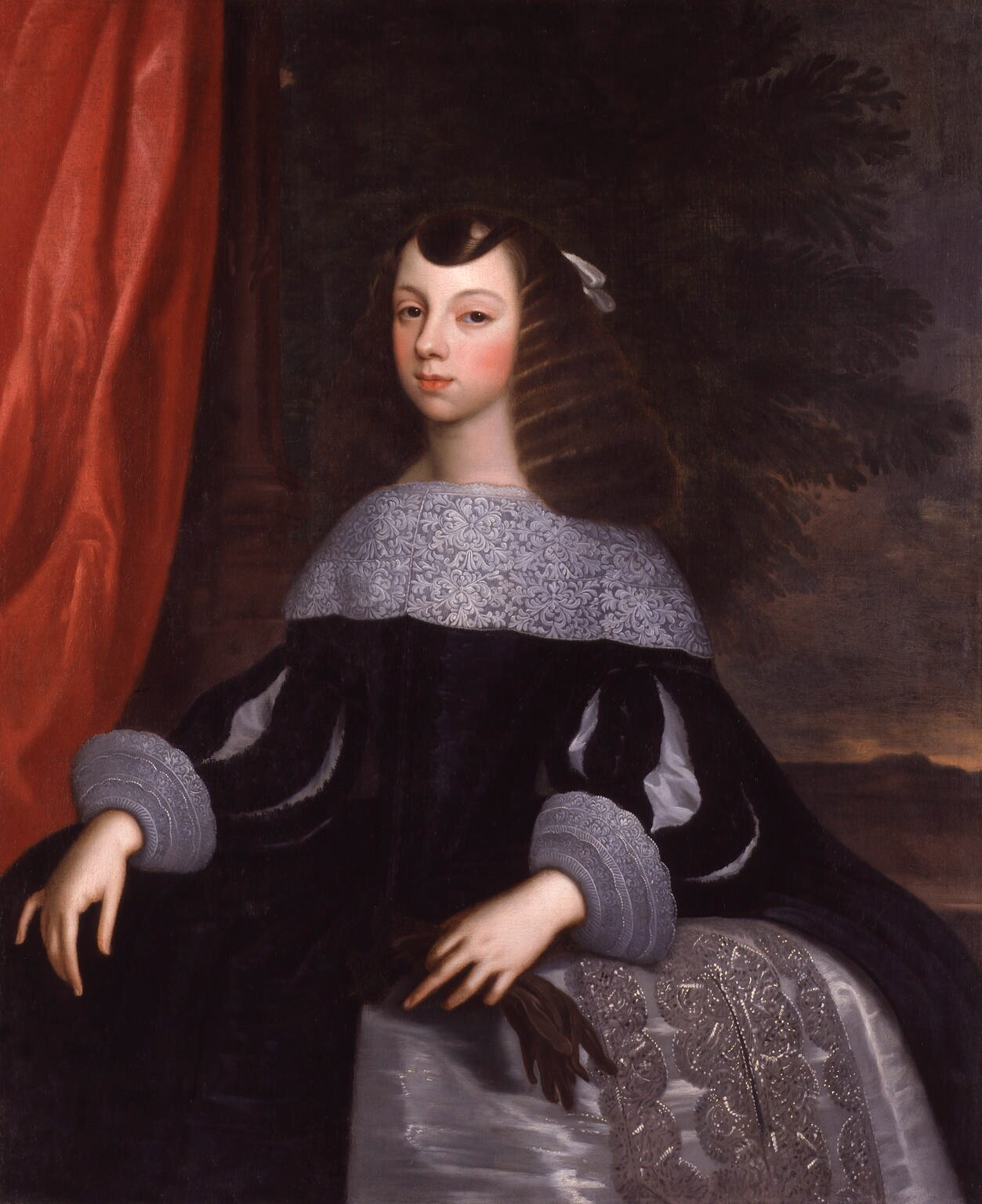
Catherine de Braganza, whose marriage treaty with Charles II of England placed Bombay in the possession of the British Empire

In 1652, the Surat Council of the British Empire urged the British East India Company to purchase Bombay from the Portuguese. In 1654, the British East India Company drew the attention of Oliver Cromwell, the Lord protector of the short lived Commonwealth, to this suggestion by the Surat Council, laying great stress upon its excellent harbour and its natural isolation from land-attacks. By the middle of the seventeenth century the growing power of the Dutch Empire forced the English to acquire a station in western India. The Directors of the Council of Surat reported in 1659 that every effort should be made to obtain Bombay from King John IV of Portugal. On 11 May 1661, the marriage treaty of Charles II of England and Catherine of Braganza, daughter of King John IV of Portugal, placed the port of Bombay in the possession of the British Empire, as part of Catherine's vast dowry, along with the port of Tangier near the Strait of Gibraltar and the right for the English to reside and trade in Portuguese territories. Catherine's dowry constituted then the largest dowry ever received by a monarch.

On 19 March 1662, Abraham Shipman was appointed the first Governor and General of the city, and his fleet arrived in Bombay in September–October 1662. On being asked to hand over Bombay and Salsette to the English, the Portuguese Governor contended that Bombay Island alone had been ceded, and alleging irregularity in the patent, he refused to give up even Bombay Island. The Portuguese Viceroy declined to interfere and Shipman was prevented from landing in Bombay. He was forced to retire to the island of Anjediva in North Canara and died there in October 1664. In November 1664, Shipman's successor Humphrey Cooke agreed to accept Bombay Island without its dependencies, with the condition of granting special privileges to Portuguese citizens in Bombay, and no interference in the Roman Catholic religion. However, Salsette (including Bandra), Mazagaon, Parel, Worli, Sion, Dharavi, Wadala and Elephanta island still remained under Portuguese possession, as much as Thane or Vasai. From 1665 to 1666, Cooke managed to acquire Mahim, Sion, Dharavi, and Wadala for the English.

== Historiography ==
The historical period of Portuguese colonial rule in the seven original islands of Bombay (1534–1665) and in the remaining territory of the Northern Province of the Estado da Índia (1534–1739) has been scantly researched. During the second half of the 19th century, Dr. J Gerson da Cunha, a Bombayite of Goan origin, began compiling information on the subject and published some books and articles. He wrote the first book on history of Bombay, The Origin of Bombay, published by the Bombay branch of the Royal Asiatic Society. Later, Braz Fernandes, an East-Indian, took up da Cunha's work and provided more in depth studies, especially about the Island of Salsette (Shashti) and the ruins in Vasai. Since the Independence of India, a few historians and scholars in Bombay have studied local or partial aspects of the period's history. Of particular interest are the works of Mariam Dossal, Pankaj Joshi, Theresa Albuquerque and Fleur de Souza. However, the most significant recent contribution to the study of Bombay's Portuguese layer has come from the research project Bombay Before the British, developed by the Architecture Department of the University of Coimbra between 2004 and 2007.

== See also ==
- History of Bombay
- Portuguese India
- Bombay Before the British
- British Bombay
- Indo-Portuguese Creole of Bombay
- Military history of Bassein
- Portuguese settlement in Chittagong, Bengal

== Notes ==
a The current Bombay Castle was a structure built by the British on the site of the manor house.
