= Walkeshwar =

- Neighbourhood
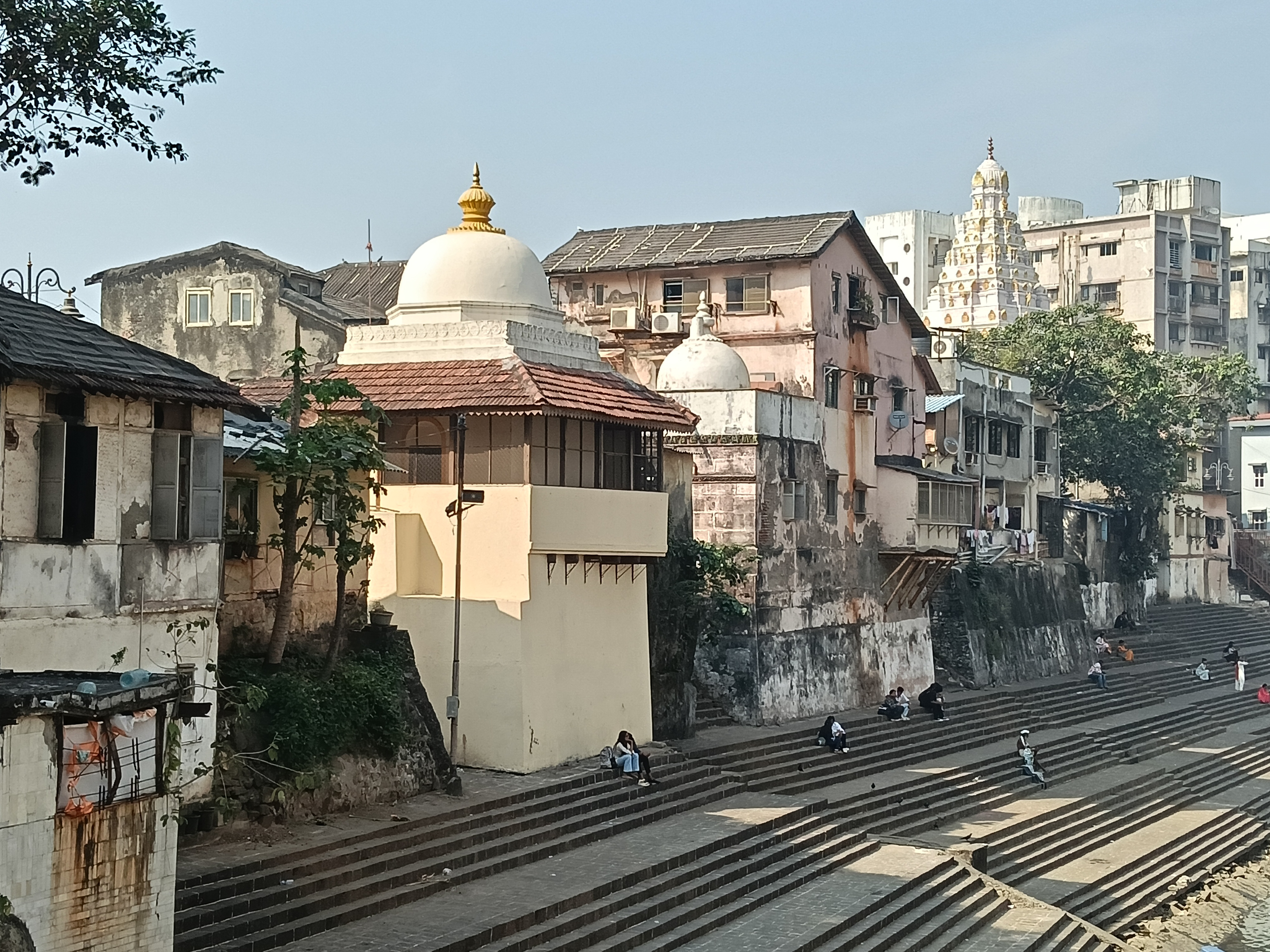
- View of the Walkeshwar Teertha at Banganga

- Location within Mumbai
- Coordinates: 18.9475964°N 72.7959574°E
- Country: India
- State: Maharashtra
- District: Mumbai City
- City: Mumbai

Government
  - Type: Municipal Corporation
  - Body: Brihanmumbai Municipal Corporation (MCGM)

Languages
  - Official: Marathi
- Time zone: UTC+5:30 (IST)
- PIN: 400006
- Area code: 022
- Vehicle registration: MH 01
- Civic agency: BMC

Walkeshwar (Pronunciation: [ʋaːɭkeʃʋəɾ]) is an affluent area in South Mumbai, India, at the north-western end of the Marine Drive loop. It has a large Gujarati population. It is mostly known for Walkeshwar Temple, Banganga Tank and Jain temples.

== Etymology ==
Walkeshwar takes its name after Lord Shiva, one part of the Trinity of Hinduism. The modern form of the word derives from the Sanskrit word for an idol made of sand - Valuka Iswar, an avatar of Shiva - in a legend celebrated at the Walkeshwar Temple, situated at the highest point of the city.

== Legend ==
Legend has it that Hindu god, Ram paused at that spot on his way from Ayodhya to Lanka in pursuit of the demon king, Ravana who had kidnapped his wife, Sita. Then Lord Rama was advised to worship Shiv linga and he is said to have constructed the original linga of sand, after getting tired of waiting for his brother, Lakshman to bring an idol. The name is etymologically derived from the Sanskrit word for an idol made of sand -- Valuka Iswar, an Avatar of Shiva.

As the story progresses, later when Ram was thirsty, as there was no fresh water readily available (only sea water), he shot an arrow and brought Ganges over here. Hence Bana (arrow in Sanskrit) Ganges. The water that feeds the tank stems from an underground spring at that spot, despite its proximity to the sea.

== Overview ==
Walkeshwar also includes Malabar Hill, and is close to the Hanging Gardens. Raj Bhavan, the official residence of the governor of Maharashtra, has the maximum number of Gulmohur trees thus making a pretty site in the season is located here besides some of the most expensive neighbourhoods in the whole country, prices ranging from Rs 92,000 to Rs 1,00,000 per square foot (approximately $US1656–1800 per square foot), which can be compared to residential luxury apartments in the US. It probably has the most expensive real estate in the whole of India. It has a lot of prime residential buildings in the area. Most of the buildings are sea facing and the location has lot of natural character. The sea is very calm here as it is the bay area. There is also a Jain temple, near the Malabar Hill Police Station.

== Places of interest ==
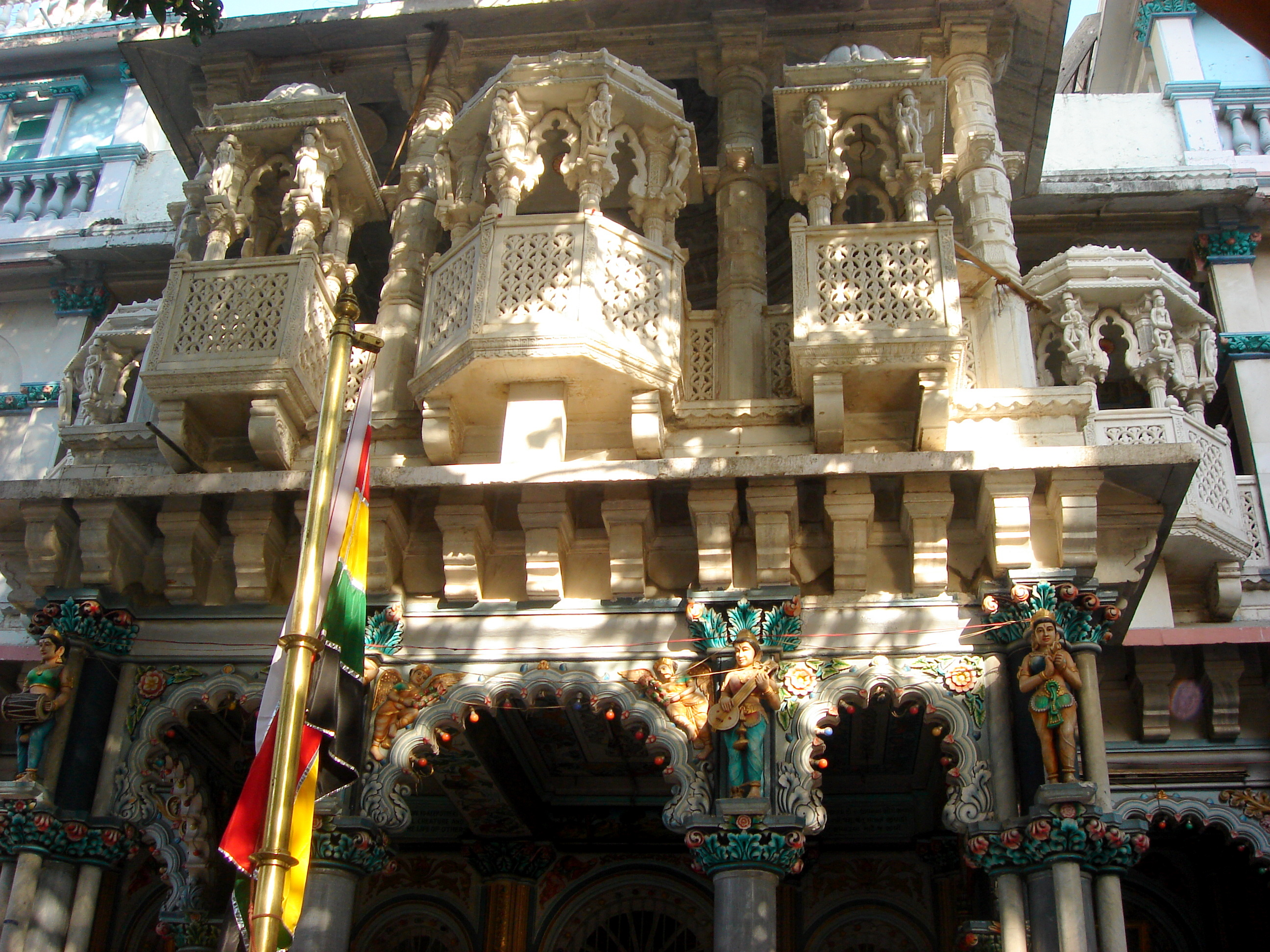
Babu Amichand Panalal Adishvarji Jain Temple

- Babu Amichand Panalal Adishvarji Jain Temple : Babu Amichand Panalal Adishvarji Jain Temple is one of the most visited Jain temple in Mumbai. This temple was built in 1904 and belongs the Śvetāmbara sect of Jainism. The temple is known for its intricate carvings, architecture and paintings. It is dedicated to Adishvarji(Rishabhanatha), the first tirthankara of Jainism. The mulnayak is a sculpture of Adishvarji. Padmavati and Ghantakaran Mahavir are also represented. The Parshvayaksha the 'adhisthayak Dev' form of Lord Parshwanatha is found here. There are carvings of Navgraha, Yaksha and Yakshi on the ceiling. Chandanbala Jain Temple lies close by.
- Valkeshvar Temple also known as the Baan Ganga Temple, is a temple dedicated to Shiva. The temple and the attached fresh water Banganga Tank were built in 1127 AD.
- The Hanging Gardens or Ferozshah Mehta Gardens, are terraced gardens at the top of Malabar Hill, in the west, facing Kamala Nehru Park. The sun set views over the Arabian Sea, are majestic beyond sculpted hedges. The park was laid out in 1881 by Ulhas Ghapokar over Bombay's main reservoir.
- Banganga Tank is an ancient water tank which is part of the Valkeshwar Temple Complex in Malabar Hill area of Mumbai in India built in the 1127 AD.

Kamala Nehru Park, named after the wife of PM Jawaharlal Nehru, is one of the oldest parks in Mumbai, a verdant oasis in the city. Its extent appears to be shoe-like so it is also known as Shoe Park.

== Gallery ==
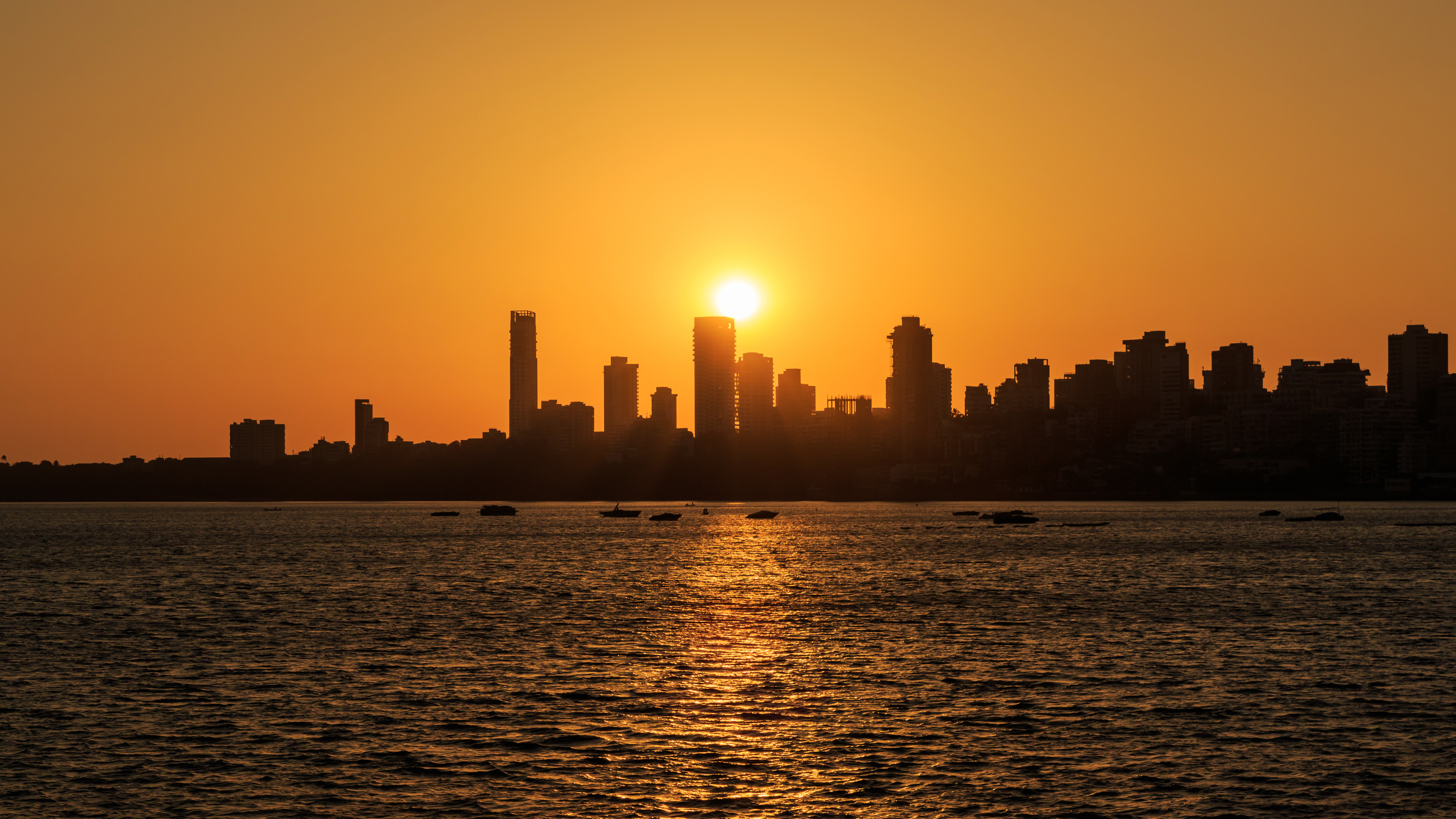
Skyline of Walkeshwar during sunset

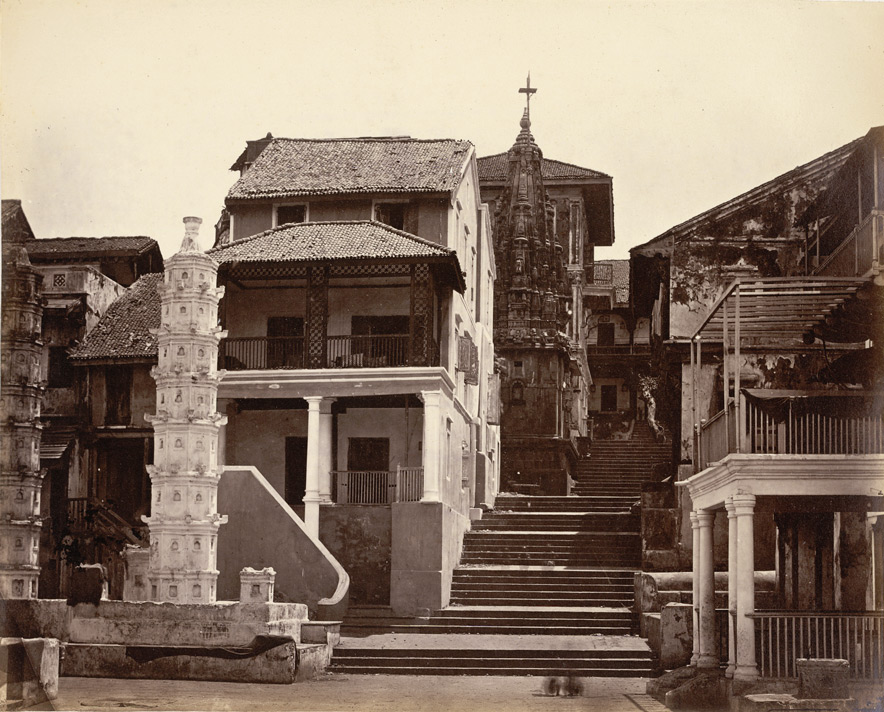
Village of Walkeshwar, Mumbai, 1860

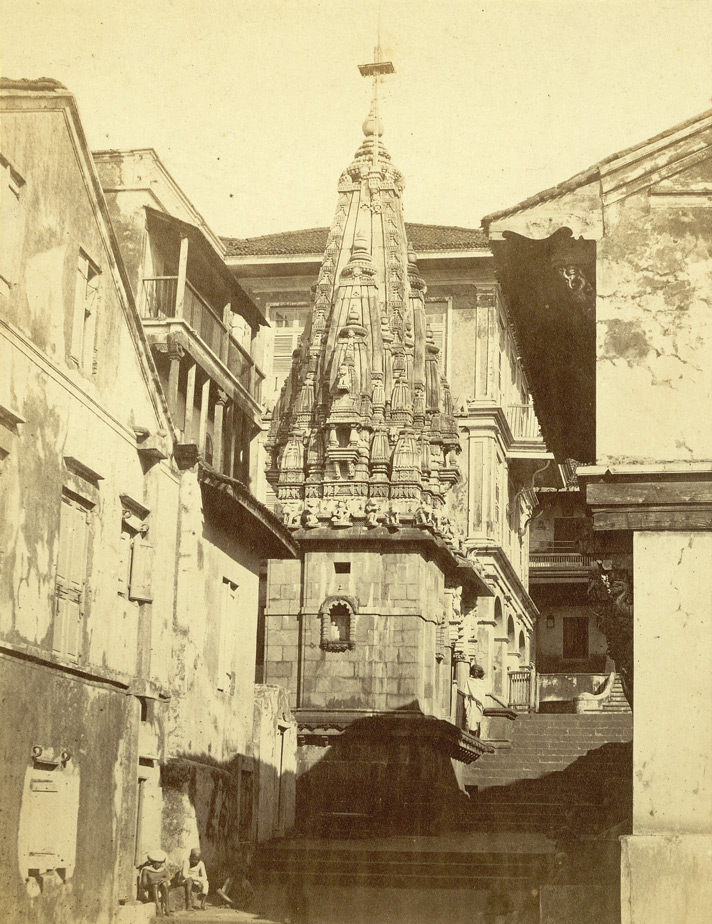
Walkeshwar, Bombay, c. 1855

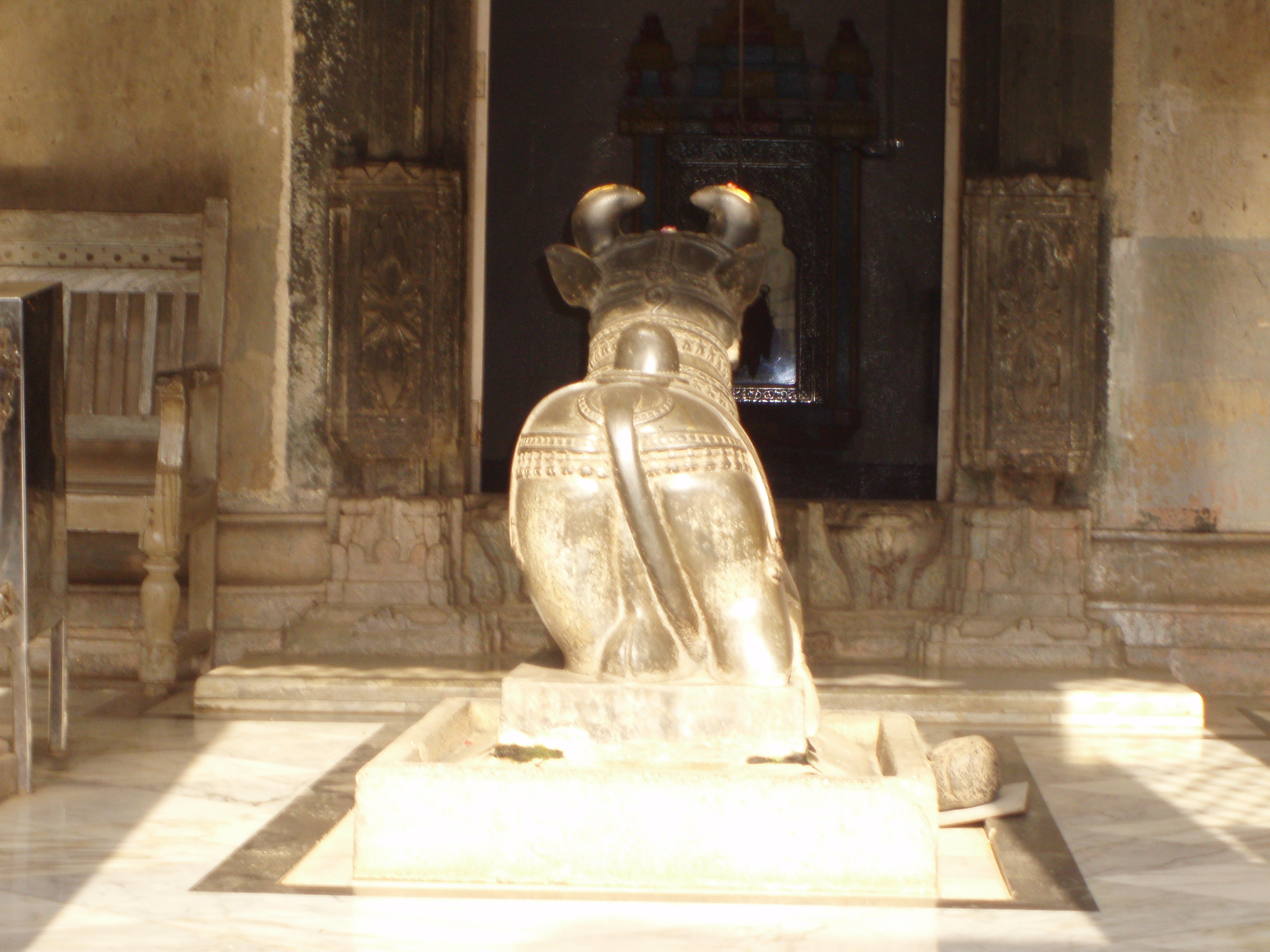
Nandi stands Guard at a Shiva Temple Walkeshwar, Mumbai, India

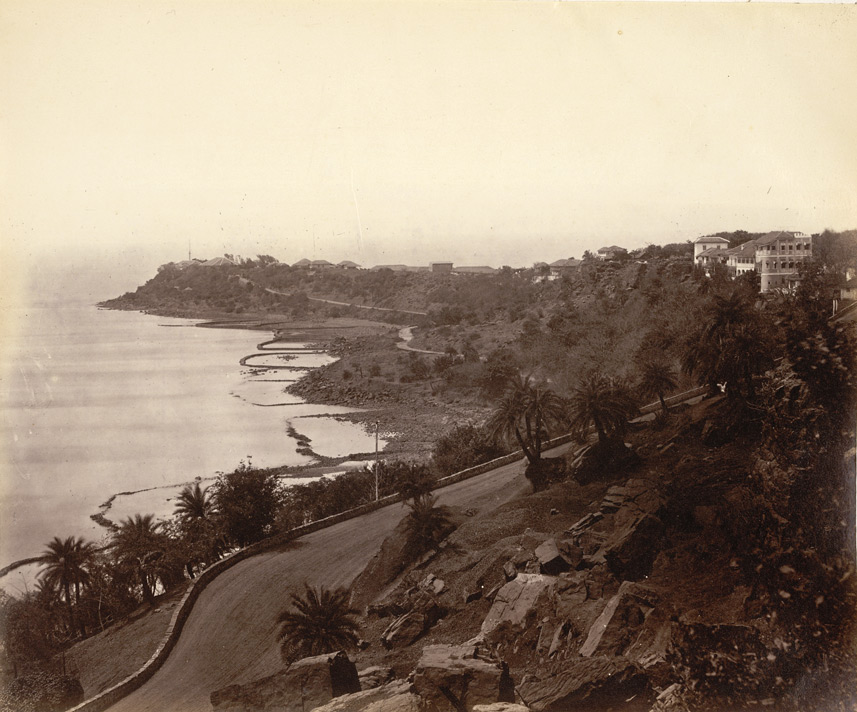
Malabar Point, Bombay, 1865

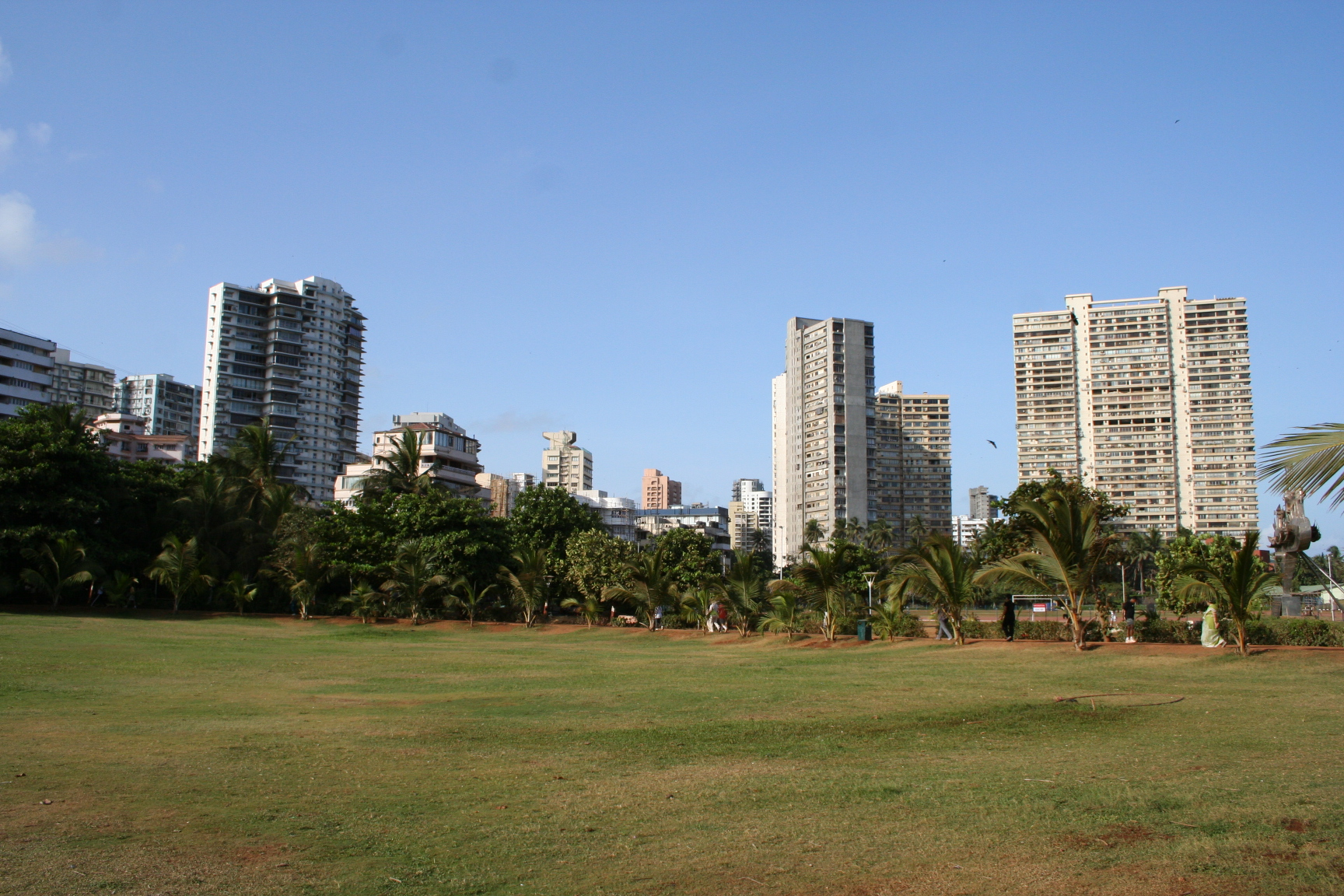
Priyadarshini Park in Mumbai

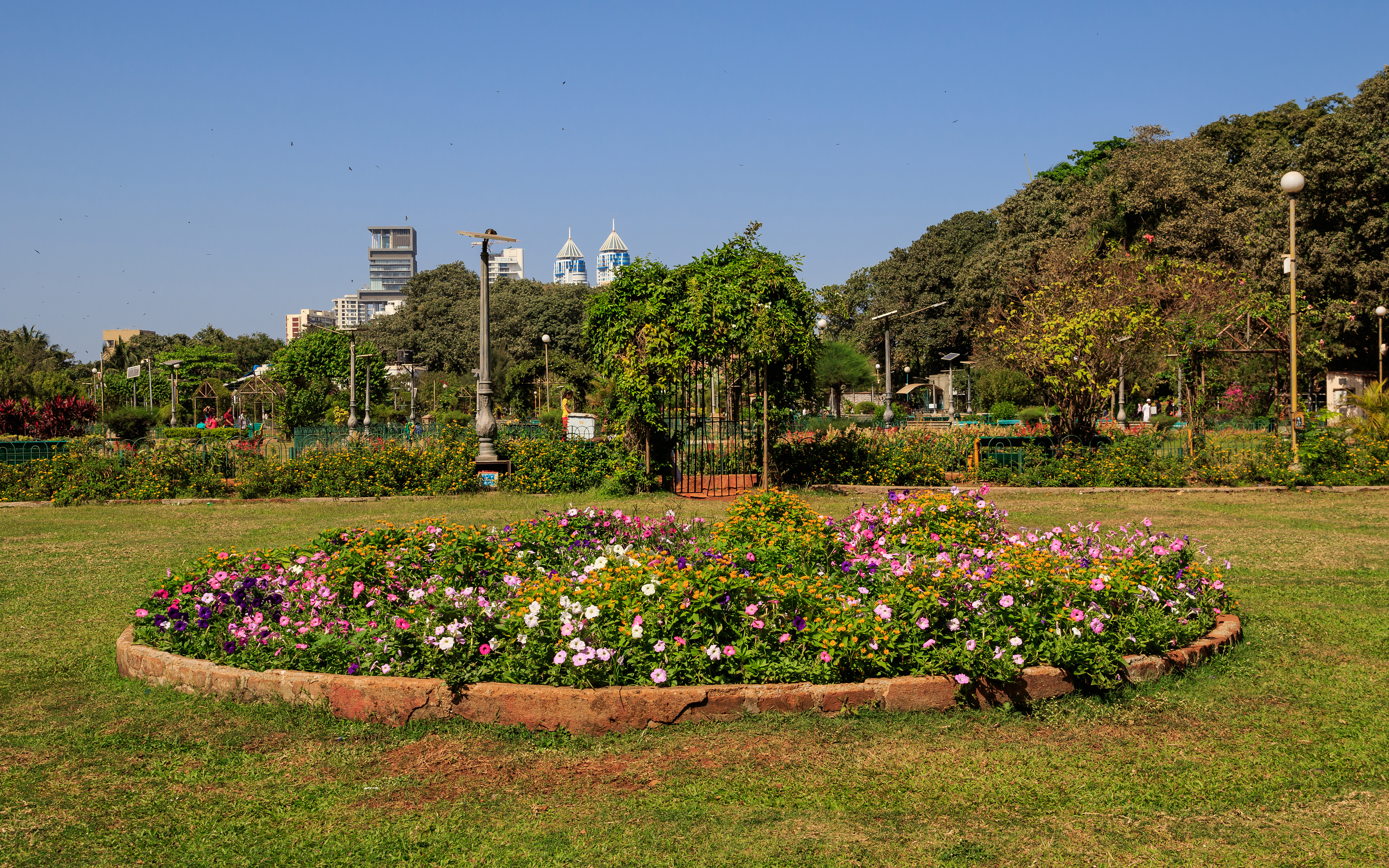
The Hanging Gardens at Malabar Hill

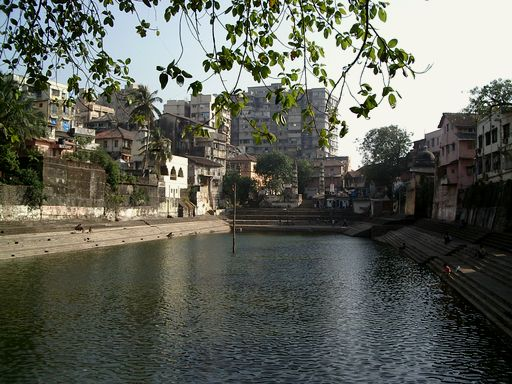
Banganga tank

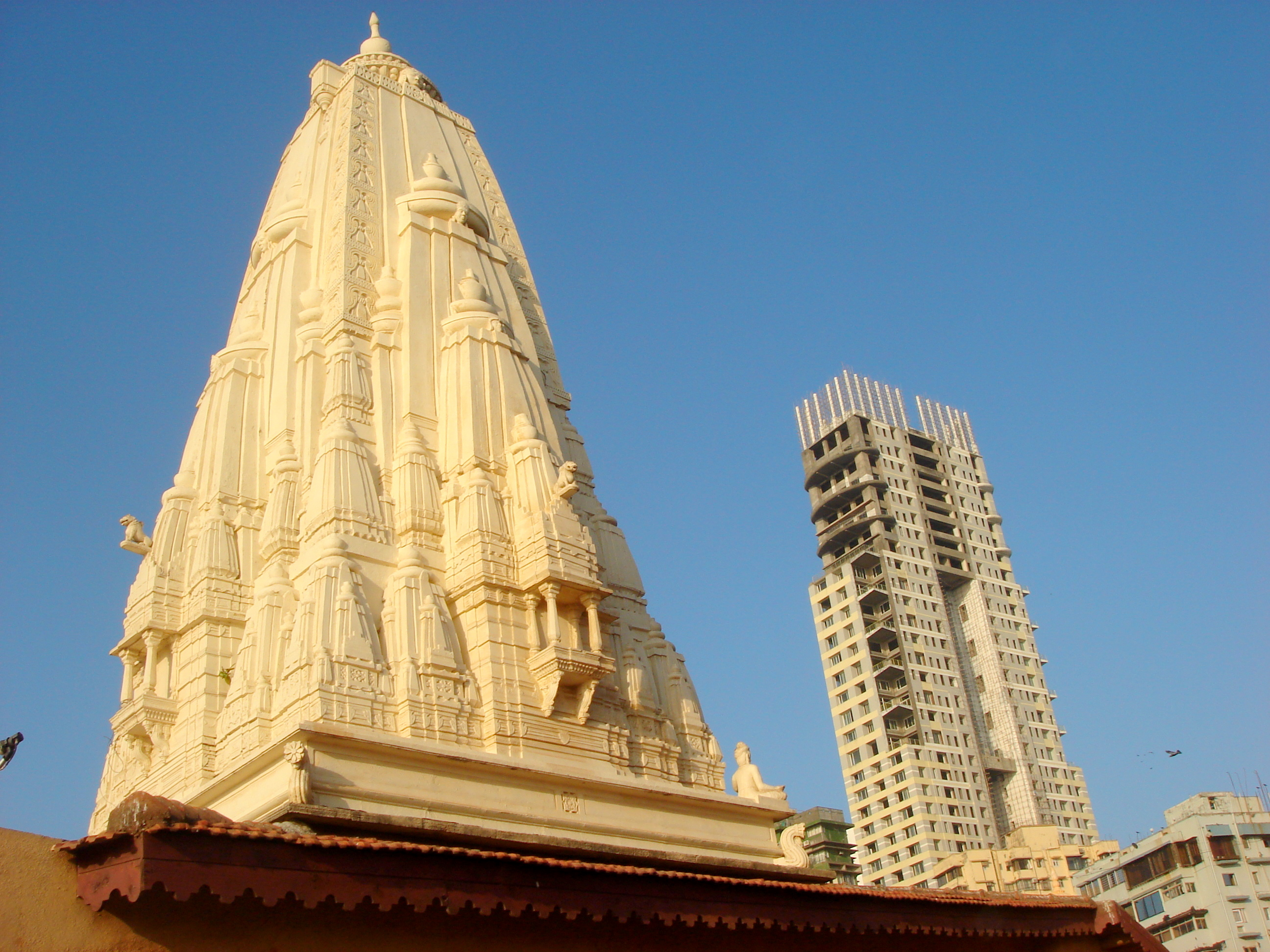
Walkeshwar Temple

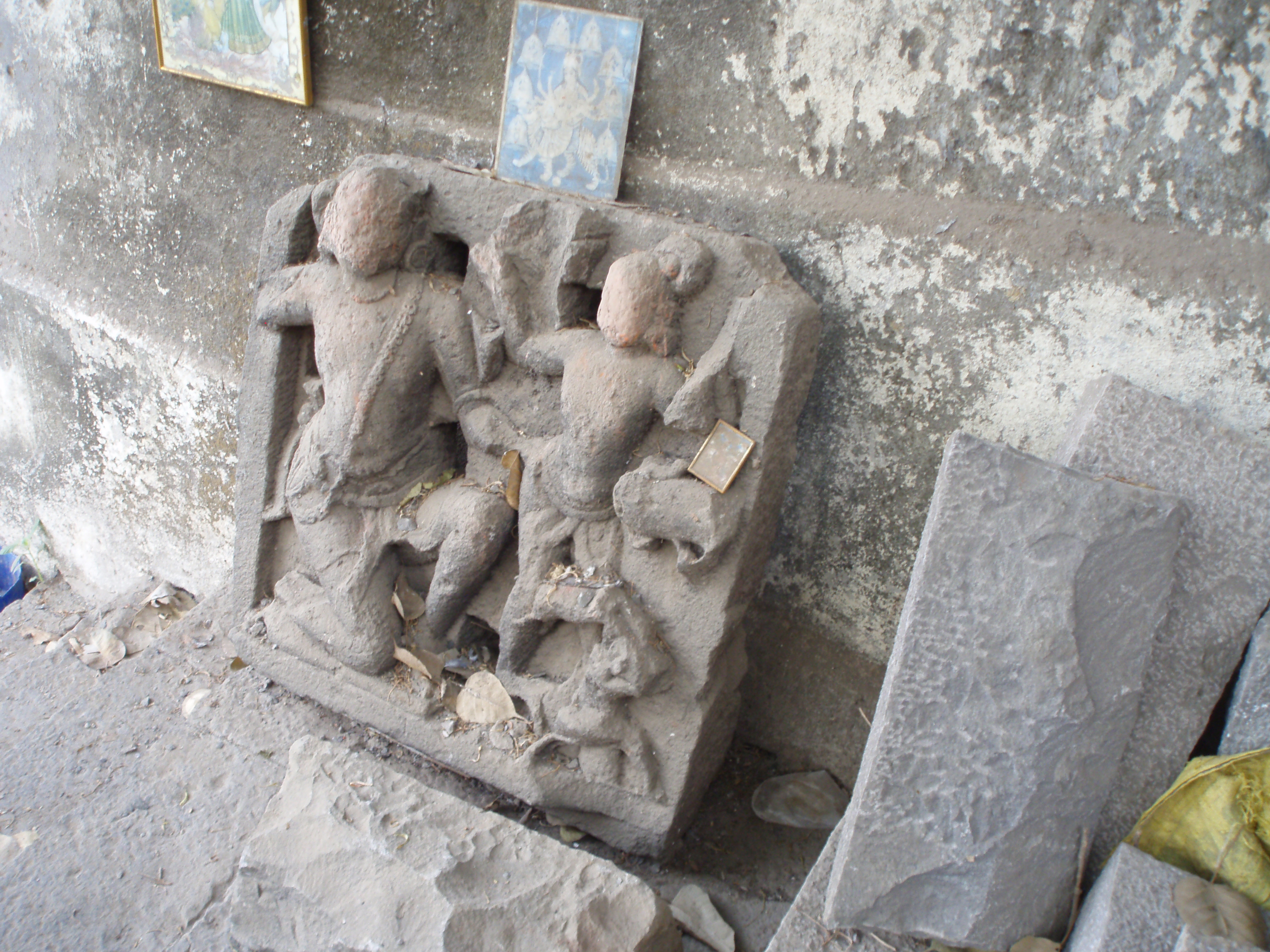
Ancient statues around Banganga Tank, Walkeshwar

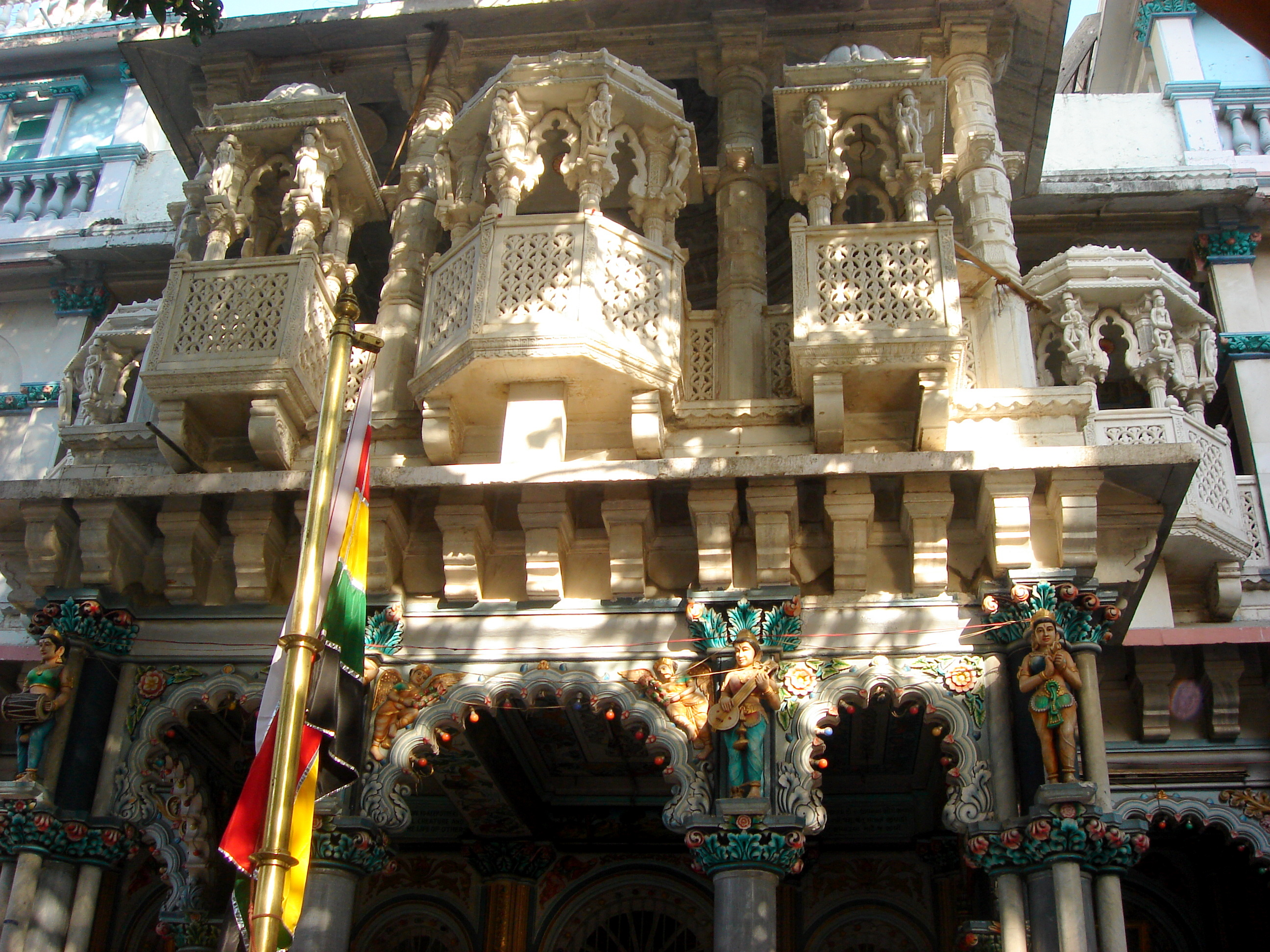
Babu Amichand Panalal Adishwarji Jain Temple

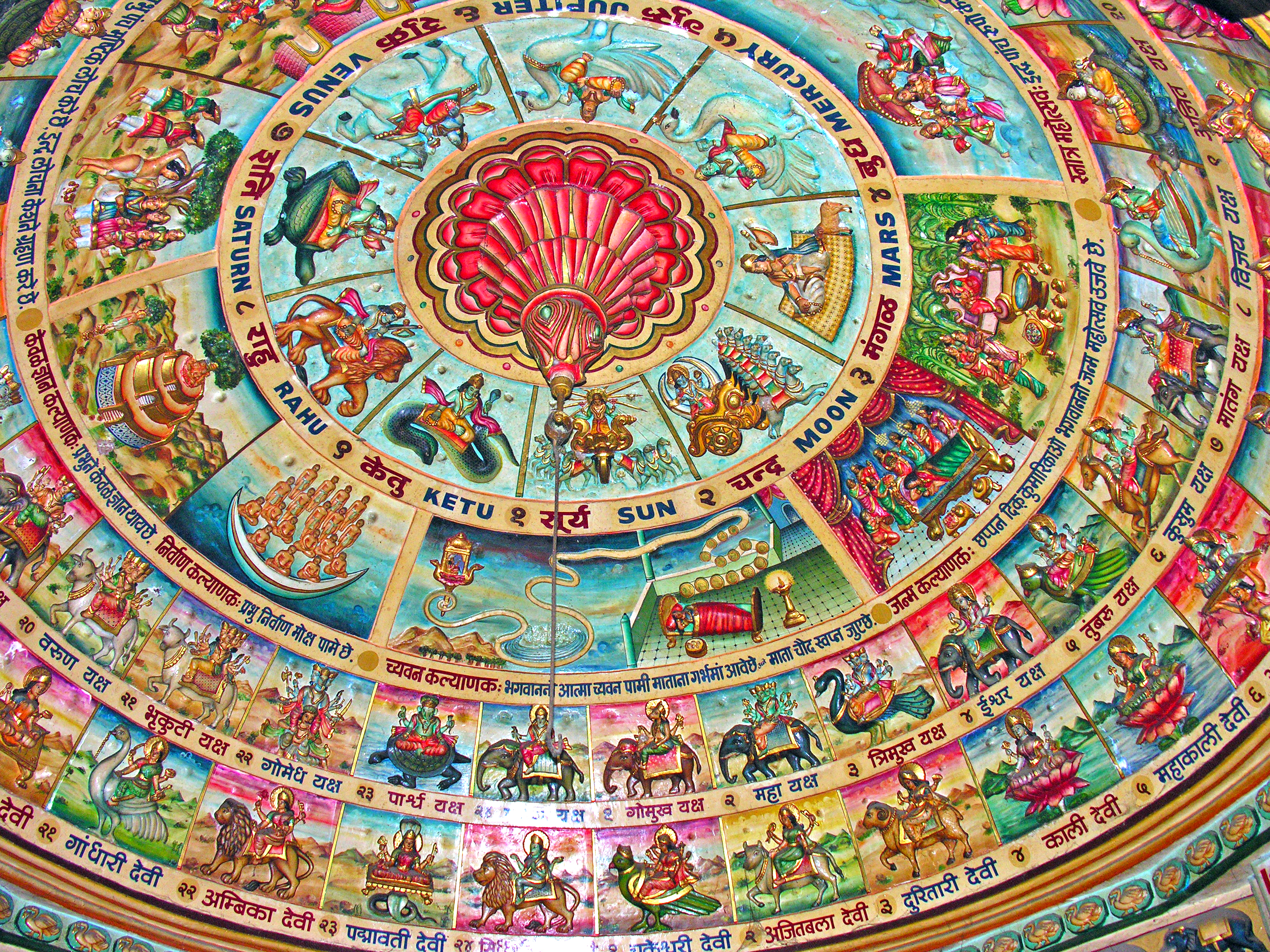
Carving of Navgraha, Yaksha and Yakshi on ceiling of Jain Temple

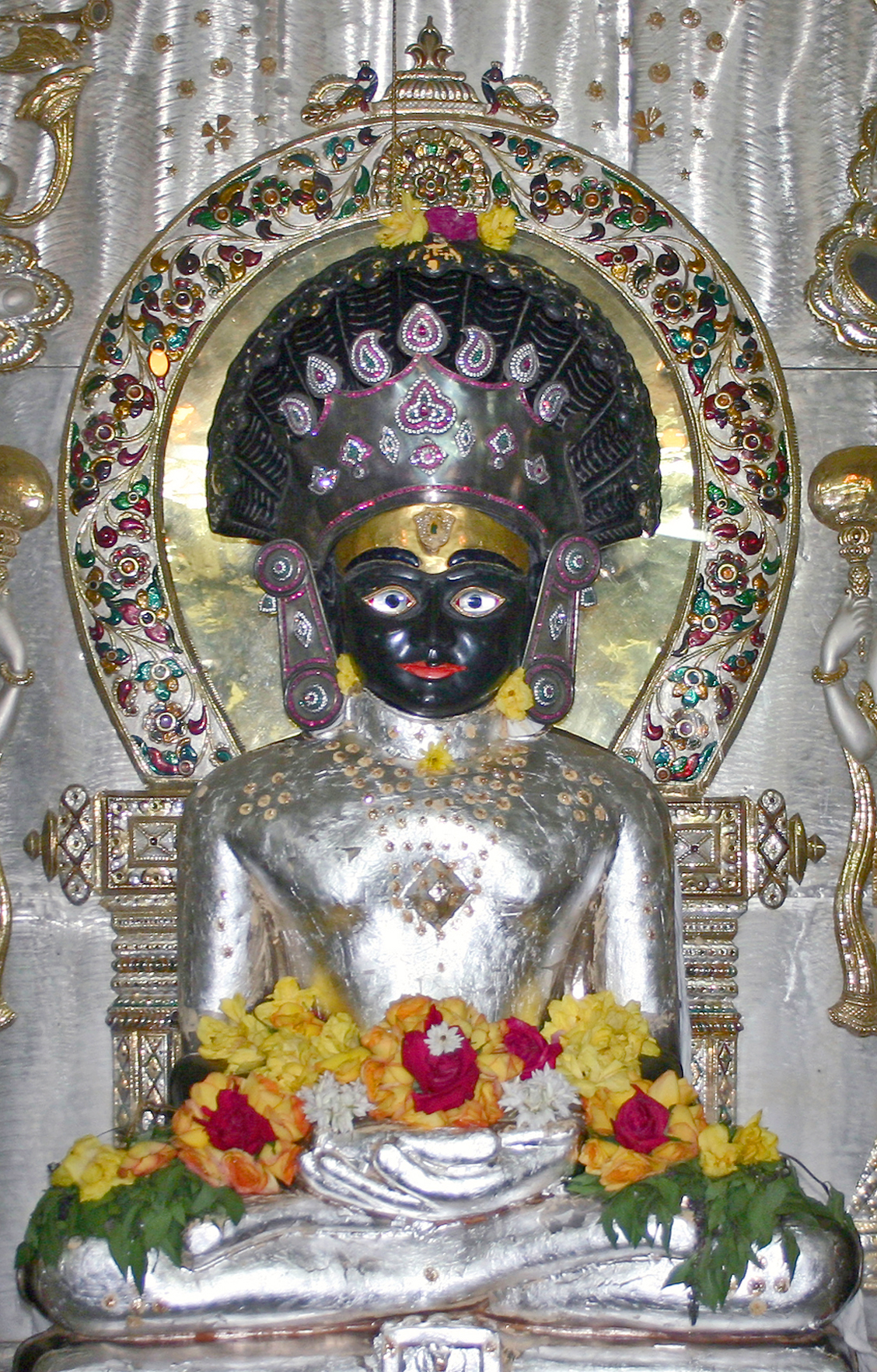
Idol of Parshvantha

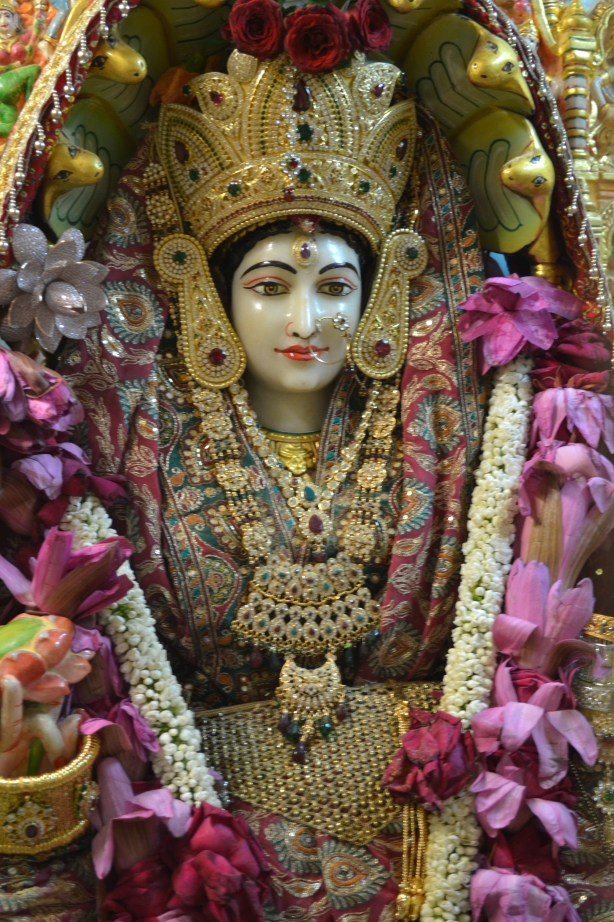
Goddess Padmavati at Walkeshwar Jain Temple

== See also ==
- Walkeshwar Temple
- Parshuram Mandir, Walkeshwar
- Jabreshwar Mahadev Mandir
- Malabar Hill
