= St. John the Baptist Church, Mumbai =

Ruined church in Mumbai

St. John the Baptist Church
- Igreja de São João Batista
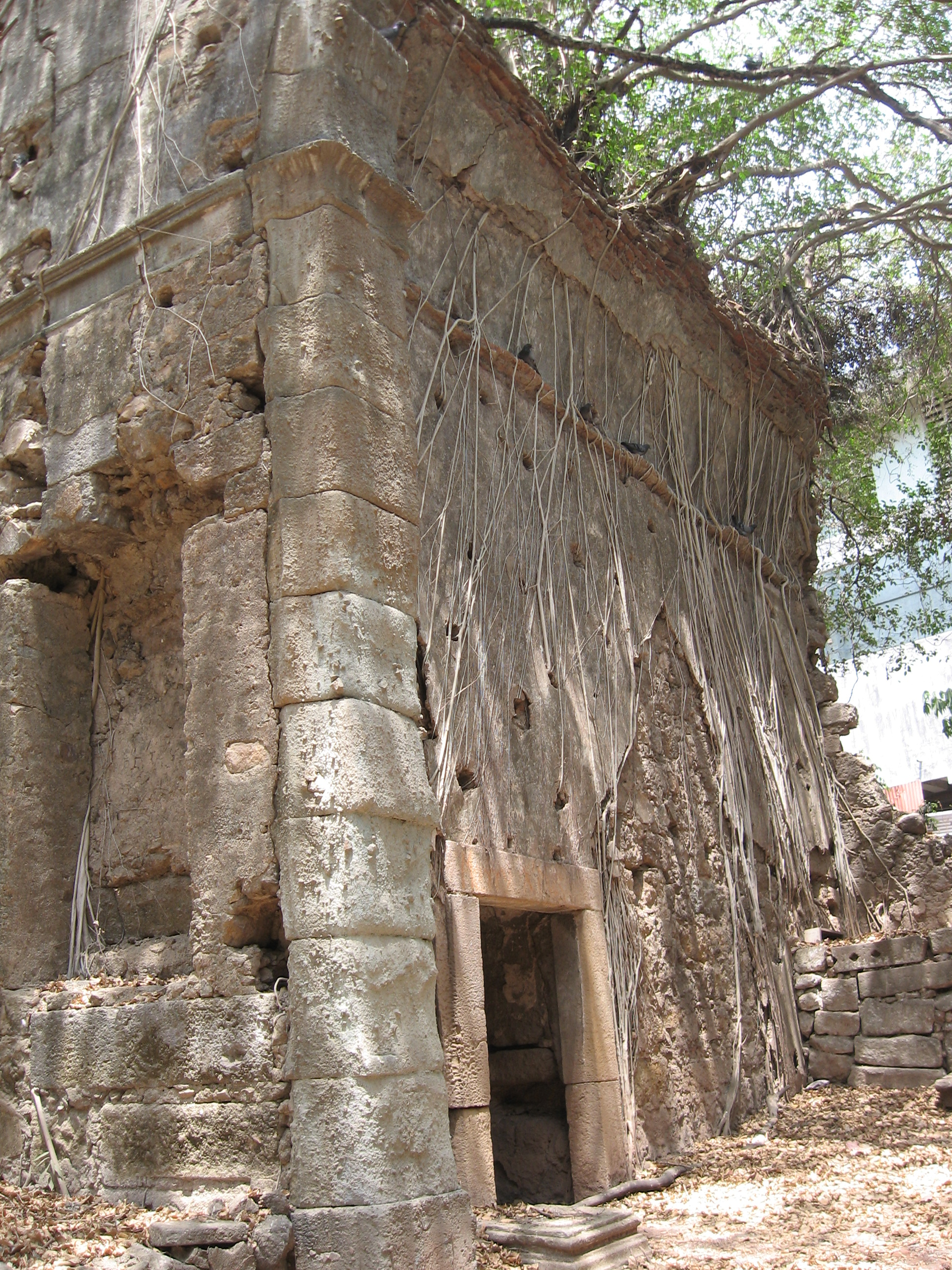
- Ruins of St. John the Baptist Church

- Location of the church
- 19°07′18″N 72°52′28″E
- Location: Andheri, Mumbai
- Country: India
- Denomination: Catholic Church
- Sui iuris church: Latin Church

History
- Status: Ruins

Architecture
- Functional status: Inactive (since 1840 AD); Semi-active (since 2003 AD)
- Architectural type: Church
- Style: Baroque
- Years built: 1579 AD

Administration
- Diocese: Archdiocese of Bombay

St. John the Baptist Church is an abandoned and ruined Roman Catholic church presently located within the SEEPZ Industrial Area, in Andheri, Mumbai, India. It was built by the Portuguese Jesuits in 1579 and opened to public worship on the feast of John the Baptist that year. It also had an attached graveyard. The church was abandoned in 1840 after an epidemic hit the village. Fr. José Lourenço Pais, the then Vicar of Kondivita transferred the church to the nearby Marol village. The baptismal font, pillars and altars were transferred to the new church.

== History ==
St John the Baptist Church was constructed by Jesuits in 1579 during Portuguese Bombay. It was recorded that when it opened, 500 locals from Marol were baptised there, with a similar number being converted to Christianity in 1588. The church remained used for active worship until 1840 during British East India Company rule when an unknown epidemic occurred in the village. The church was abandoned and the priest transferred ownership to Marol and built a new church nearby within Bombay, using many stripped out furnishings and fittings from St John the Baptist.

After abandonment, the church fell into decay and vegetation started to take over the ruins. Following abandonment, local reports claimed the ruins were possessed and haunted leading to a formal exorcism being held in 1977 leading to fewer claims of the ruins being haunted. Despite being abandoned, it is still consecrated and native Indian Christians visit the church once every year for Mass, as is traditional worldwide. The church was handed back to Fr. Rodney Esperance of the Roman Catholic Archdiocese of Bombay in 2003 by the then Maharashtra, Chief Minister Sushil Kumar Shinde. In 2026, the church was subject to Christophobic vandalism with various roadside crosses dating back to the Portuguese era near the church being damaged.
