= Bombay Before the British: The Indo-Portuguese Layer =

Detail of the "Bombay Before the British" interactive GIS map, showing the Greater Mumbai area (BBB, 2007)

Bombay Before the British (BBB) was a three-year research project in the fields of History of Architecture and History of Urbanism, funded by the Portuguese Ministry of Science, Technology and Higher Education through its Science and Technology Foundation (FCT).

The funding for the project began in September 2004 and ended in December 2007, when a final report was submitted containing the project's main conclusions. This report received the highest mark by FCT's evaluating panel. Both senior investigators of the "BBB", Dr. Walter Rossa and Dr. Paulo Varela Gomes, were and are professors at the Architecture Department, Faculty of Sciences and Technology, University of Coimbra (Portugal).

The project's main object of study was the territory of Greater Bombay (Mumbai) and its surrounding hinterland (Greater Bombay Metropolitan Area) during the time of Portuguese colonial rule (1534–1739) in the territory that was known as the Baçaim (Vasai) District of the Northern Province of Portuguese India, "Northern" in relation to Velha Goa.

== Background ==
In 1997, Dr. Walter Rossa's book "Indo-portuguese Cities" was published by the Portuguese Discoveries Celebrations Committee (CNCDP). The following year, Dr. Rossa coordinated the topographical survey of the ruins of the Baçaim (Vasai). During this period (1996–1998), Dr. Paulo Varela Gomes was the delegate of the Oriente Foundation's branch in India (Goa). In 2000, both of them travelled to the area of Greater Mumbai, together with the second-year students of the Department of Architecture, University of Coimbra, visiting many of the historical sites pertaining to the territory's Indo-Portuguese layer. The research possibilities developed during this trip and the recent scholarly activity of both Rossa and Gomes led up to the proposal for a three-year scientific research project - the "BBB"

== Overview of the project ==
The Portuguese presence in the Baçaim (Vasai) District of the Northern Province between 1534 and 1739 - which included the present day region of Greater Mumbai - has left considerable traces on the present-day territory. These include not only ruins of military and religious structures but also structures founded by the Portuguese and later modified or rebuilt by other administrations or communities. Most of the Churches that cater to the Catholic population of Greater Mumbai today - the Bombay East Indians - were founded by Portuguese missionaries. Significant information exists within sixteenth and seventeenth century Portuguese sources to prove that Catholic Communities were inexistent in the Northern Province area at the time of Portuguese occupation in 1534 (although it is very probable that some Christian communities developed in the area during the 7th and 8th centuries A.D., having become defunct by the time of the Portuguese arrival). Beside the network of forts and churches, the Portuguese Northern Province also presented a network of villages that developed under colonial rule. Most of these villages were leased to Portuguese or Indo-Portuguese landed gentry. Especially in Salsette Island, this network of villages was still in place during the first decades of the 20th century and would later become the most important territorial matrix for the development of Suburban Mumbai. Indeed, the two main railway lines built during the 19th century in Salsette followed closely a pre-existing road pattern (from Kurla to Thane and from Bandra to Bhyandar) that crossed many East-Indian villages, with their distinct landscape, architecture and churches. It was only during the 1960s and 1970s that Mumbai's exponential growth submerged and, in many cases, erased this network of villages. A few survive along the northwestern coast of Salsette Island, with their unique East Indian communities and traditions.

== Main tasks ==
The BBB's methodology included two main tasks: data gathering; and its interpretation through appropriate tools, namely GIS software. Data gathered during the project's timeline included various documents from libraries and archives in Portugal, India and the United Kingdom and also material gathered first-hand directly at the sites, through the project's field missions. This data was then stored in a Database and connected to a GIS interactive map. The GIS map used satellite imagery acquired through the European Space Agency. Over the layer of satellite imagery was added a number of layers of vectorial information, using the symbology of present-day cartography. The GIS map's interface allowed for each symbol to be connected to a number of documents stored in the Database. This methodology allowed the team to confirm the matricial importance on the East-Indian village network upon the suburban growth of Greater Mumbai all along the 20th century, among other things

== Team members ==
The original BBB team consisted of: Dr. Walter Rossa (Investigator Responsible), Architecture Department, University of Coimbra; Dr. Paulo Varela Gomes (Senior Investigator), Architecture Department, University of Coimbra; André Teixeira (Investigator), Centre for Overseas History, New University of Lisbon; Silvana Pires (Investigator), Centre for Overseas History, New University of Lisbon

Other members: Sidh Losa Mendiratta (Investigator), Architecture Department, University of Coimbra; Mafalda Trinca (Scholarship holder), Architecture Department, University of Coimbra; Susana Freiria (Scholarship holder), Architecture Department, University of Coimbra; Cláudia Costa (Scholarship holder), Architecture Department, University of Coimbra; Isabel Almeida (Scholarship holder), Centre for Overseas History, New University of Lisbon; Pedro Nobre (Scholarship holder), Centre for Overseas History, New University of Lisbon.

== Emerging dissertations and post-doctoral projects ==
Tapping into the considerable amount of resources and new lines of research created by the ongoing "BBB", two PhD dissertations and one Master dissertation were started by the following team members:

André Teixeira, Baçaim e o seu território: administração, economia e sociedade, séculos XVI a XVIII, tese de doutoramento em História, especialidade de História dos Descobrimentos e da Expansão Portuguesa à Faculdade de Ciências Sociais e Humanas da Universidade Nova de Lisboa, orientada pelo Prof. Doutor João Oliveira e Costa (2010).

Sidh Mendiratta, Dispositivos do Sistema Defensivo da Província do Norte do Estado da Índia, 1521-1739, tese de Doutoramento em História da Arquitectura ao Departamento de Arquitectura da Faculdade de Ciências e Tecnologia da Universidade de Coimbra, orientada pelo Prof. Doutor Walter Rossa e Prof. Doutor Paulo Varela Gomes, 2012.

Pedro Nobre, A Entrega de Bombaim ao Reino Unido (1661-1668) – um processo político-diplomático, dissertação de Mestrado em História dos Descobrimentos e da Expansão Portuguesa à Faculdade de Ciências Sociais e Humanas da Universidade Nova de Lisboa, 2007.

Although not officially included as part of the BBB's resulting scientific output, the following two Masters dissertations were accomplished in close association with the project's senior investigators:

Nuno Grancho, Bombaim: A Explosão Urbana Análise de Assentamentos e Vias, dissertação de mestrado em Planeamento e Projecto do Ambiente Urbano apresentada à Universidade do Porto. 2008, orientada pelo Prof. Doutor Paulo Varela Gomes, 2008.

Tania Teixeira, Bombaim Meri Jaan: a vida, a cidade e a arquitectura em Bombaim, Prova Final de Licenciatura do Departamento de Arquitectura da Faculdade de Ciências e Tecnologia da Universidade de Coimbra, orientada pelo Prof. Doutor Paulo Varela Gomes, 2009.

Also, a post-doctoral six-year research project is currently underway in close association with the project's senior investigators:

Sidh Mendiratta, "Framing Identity: cityscapes and architecture of Mumbai’s catholic communities (16th to the 20th century)", post-doctoral project based in Centro de Estudos Sociais da Universidade de Coimbra, with the advisers: Prof. Doctor Walter Rossa, Prof. Doctor Rochelle Pinto, and Prof. Doctor Vikas Dilawari.

== Publications, articles and papers ==
- GOMES, Paulo Varela, ROSSA, Walter, "O primeiro território – Bombaim e os Portugueses", in Oceanos, nº41, Lisboa, Comissão Nacional para as Comemorações dos Descobrimentos Portugueses, 2000, pp. 210–224.
- GOMES, Paulo Varela "«Bombay Portuguese», ser ou não ser português em Bombaim no século XIX" in Revista de História das Ideias, Coimbra, Instituto de História e Teoria das Ideias, (2000). [No prelo].
- GOMES, Paulo Varela, "There is no spot in the world where the Catholic and Heathen imagery come so closely in contact as here. Franciscan architecture in Mandapeshwar / Mount Poinsur, Bombay", paper no symposium The Arts & the Portuguese Colonial Experience, org. Institute of Fine Arts, New York University, 24 e 25 de Março de 2006 [no prelo]
- GOMES, Paulo Varela "Two (and a few other) Bombay churches. Issues of architecture and identity" in Mumbai Reader, Mumbai, Urban Design Research Institute, n.º 2 (2007). [No prelo].
- ROSSA, Walter "Bombay before the british: the indo-portuguese layer" in Mumbai Reader, Mumbai, Urban Design Research Institute, n.º 1 (2006), pp. 262–269.
- ROSSA, Walter, "Bombaim antes dos Ingleses: apresentação do projecto", in Actas do XIIº Seminário Internacional de História Indo-Portuguesa (Lisboa, 23 a 27 Outubro 2006), Lisboa, Centro de História de Além-Mar da Universidade Nova de Lisboa e Centro de Estudos dos Povos e Culturas de Expressão Portuguesa da Universidade Católica Portuguesa. [No prelo].
- ROSSA, Walter, MENDIRATTA, Sidh, "Ghost Towns. Ruined and disappeared Portuguese colonial settlements in coastal Maharashtra, India: new research results", paper apresentado na conferência 61st Annual Meeting of the Society of Architectural Historians, org. Society of Architectural Historians, Cincinnati, 23 a 27 de Abril de 2008.
- MENDIRATTA, Sidh, "From Islands to Mainland. Territorial policy change and the creation of the Northern Province of the Estado da Índia", paper apresentado na conferência Histories Form the Sea. Multimedia for Understanding and Teaching Europe-South Asia Maritime Heritage, org. Jawaharlal Nehru University, Nova Delhi, 30 e 31 de Janeiro de 2007.
- MENDIRATTA, Sidh, "Two Towns and a Vila. Baçaim, Chaul and Taná: the defensive structures of three Indo-Portuguese urban settlements in the Northern Province of the Estado da Índia", paper apresentado no International Seminar on Cities in Medieval India (1200-1800), org. Jawaharlal Nehru University, Nova Delhi, 6 e 7 de Março de 2008.
- TEIXEIRA, André "Os Primórdios da Presença Portuguesa em Baçaim, 1534-1554: notas sobre a situação financeira e político-militar do primeiro «território» do Estado da Índia." in D. João III e o Império, Actas do Congresso Internacional Comemorativo do Nascimento de D. João III, Lisboa, CHAM (Universidade Nova de Lisboa) e CEPCEP (Universidade Católica Portuguesa), 2004, pp. 337-365.
- TEIXEIRA, André, ALMEIDA, Isabel, NOBRE, Pedro, "A concessão de Bombaim aos ingleses: suas implicações no território de Baçaim (1661-1668)", in Actas do XIIº Seminário Internacional de História Indo-Portuguesa (Lisboa, 23 a 27 Outubro 2006), Lisboa, Centro de História de Além-Mar da Universidade Nova de Lisboa e Centro de Estudos dos Povos e Culturas de Expressão Portuguesa da Universidade Católica Portuguesa. [No prelo].
- TEIXEIRA, André, PIRES, Silvana Remédio, "O Tombo de Baçaim de 1727-1730", in Anais de História de Além-Mar, vol. VIII, Lisboa, Centro de História de Além-Mar da Universidade Nova de Lisboa, 2007, pp. 325–63
- TEIXEIRA, André, "Baçaim, the city and its hinterland", paper apresentado no International Seminar on Cities in Medieval India (1200-1800), org. Jawaharlal Nehru University, Nova Delhi, 6 e 7 de Março de 2008. [No prelo].
- ROSSA, Walter, "Enquadramento geral: os quês deste volume"; "Enquadramento I: Província do Norte e Norte da Índia"; "Chaul: urbanismo e perímetro abaluartado"; "Daman: urbanismo e perímetro abaluartado"; "Diu: urbanismo, arquitectura militar e arquitectura religiosa (com Nuno Grancho)"; "Mumbai (Bombaim)"; "Vasai Fort (Baçaim): urbanismo e perímetro abaluartado", in José Mattoso (dir. obra) e Walter Rossa (coord. volume) (org.), Património de Origem Portuguesa no Mundo: arquitectura e urbanismo — Ásia e Oceania, Lisboa, Fundação Calouste Gulbenkian, 2010.
- MENDIRATTA, Sidh Losa, "Forte do Morro-Chaul"; "Daman: Forte de São Jerónimo"; "Dahanu"; "Ghodbandar"; "Karanja: Nossa Senhora da Penha"; "Sanjan"; "Shirgaon"; "Tarapur"; "Vasai Fort: Forte de São Sebastião"; "Arnala"; "Asherigad";"Thane: Arquitetura Militar"; "Mahim-Kelve", in Mattoso, José; Rossa, Walter (orgs.), Património de Origem Portuguesa no Mundo: arquitectura e urbanismo — Ásia e Oceania. Lisboa: Fundação Calouste Gulbenkian, 2010.
