= Dorabji Nanabhoy =

Dorabji Nanabhoy was reputedly the first Parsi to arrive on the islands Bombay (now Mumbai) in 1640. This was soon after the Portuguese established the town of Bombay. Dorabji Nanabhoy worked as a manager for the Portuguese. In 1668, when Bombay was given to the British, Dorabji became the tax collector and his family held this position till 1834.

“He was employed by the authorities in transacting miscellaneous business with the natives of the place. When the island was ceded to England, he was appointed to a similar office; and as the new rulers were ignorant of the place, manners, language and customs of the people, he was frequently consulted by them on the affairs of state.” - ‘The Parsees: Their History, Manners, Customs, and Religion’, a significant work by Dosabhai Framji Karaka, mentions the story of the Dorabji family.

In 1692, a severe plague broke out in Bombay, when most of the Europeans of the place and soldiers in the garrison fell victim to the disease. Taking advantage of this unfortunate situation, the Sidis of Jungeera invaded Bombay with a large force and took possession of the island and Dungerry fort.

Dorabjee’s son Rustom Dorab, who had succeeded his father in the service of the Bombay government, shouldered the responsibility to drive away the Sidis. He raised a militia from among the local population, fought the invaders and defeated them. He then despatched messengers with the news of the victory to the chief of the English factory at Surat. For the invaluable service, Rustom Dorab was honoured with the hereditary title of Patel (Lord or Chief) of Bombay.
