= Hanging Gardens of Mumbai =

Indian terraced gardens

Coordinates: 18.956724°N 72.804937°E

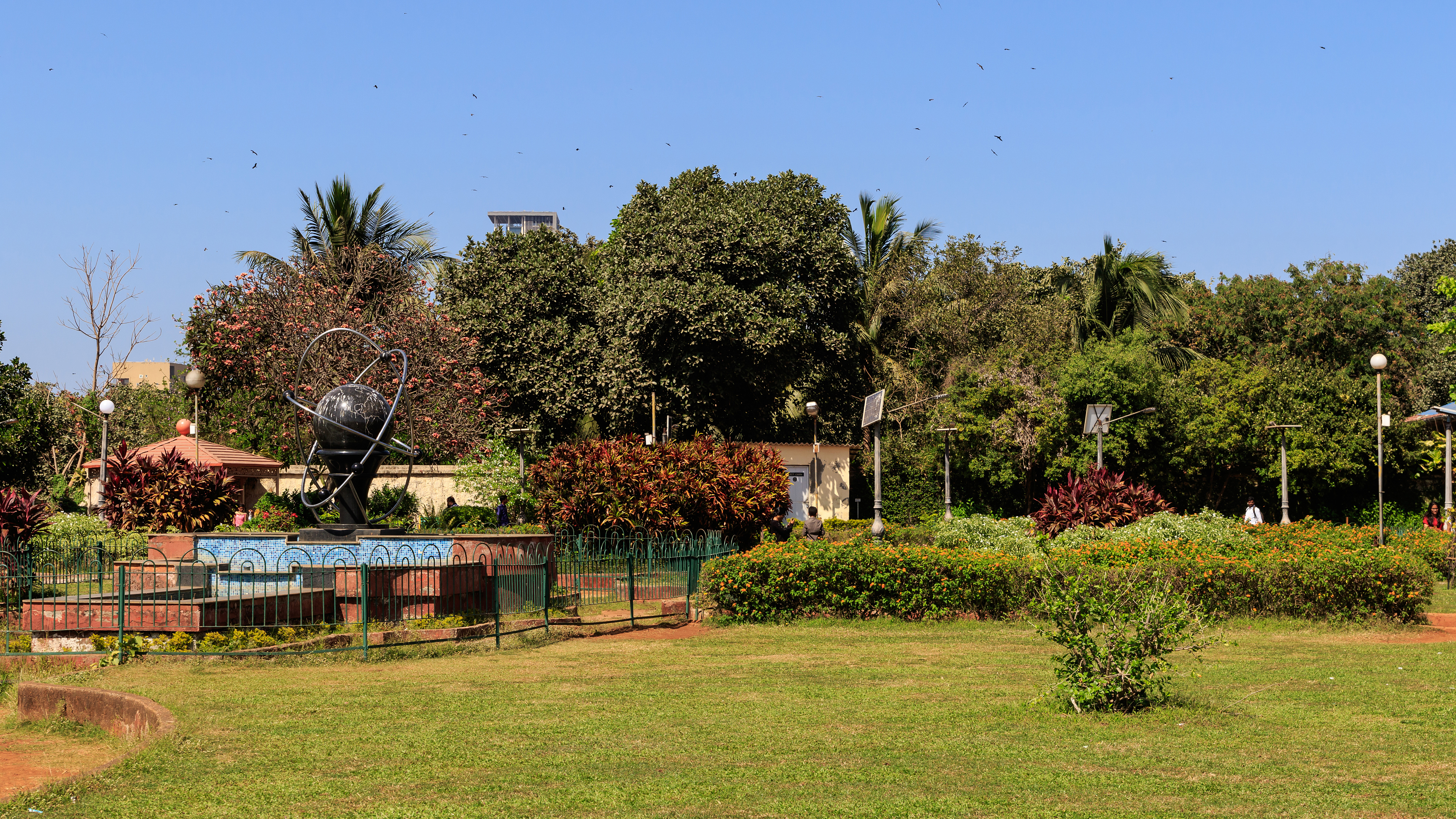
Hanging Gardens

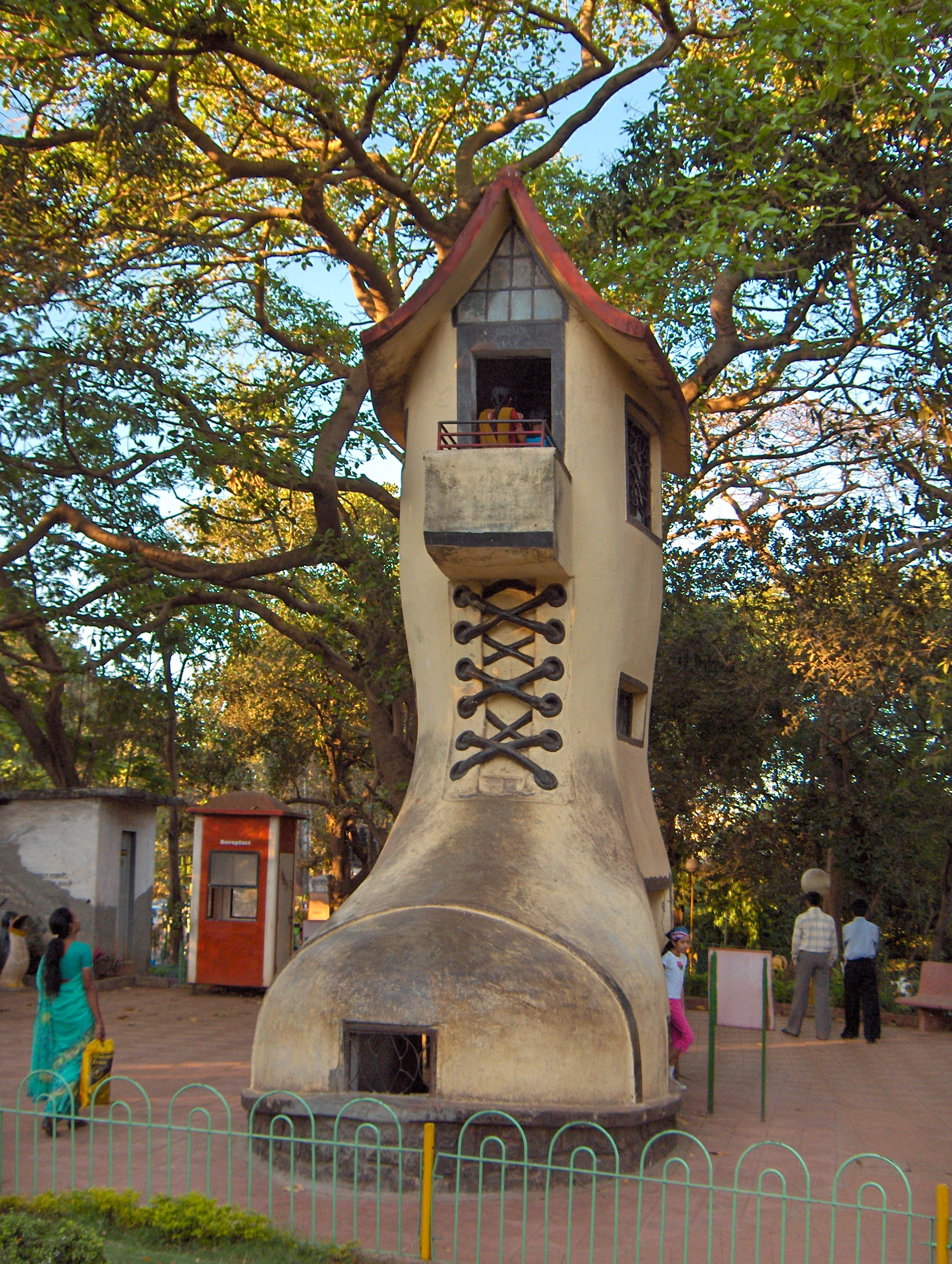
The iconic Boot House

The Hanging Gardens, in Mumbai (still widely known as Bombay), also known as Pherozeshah Mehta Gardens, are terraced gardens perched at the top of Malabar Hill, on its western side, just opposite the Kamala Nehru Park. They provide sunset views over the Arabian Sea and feature numerous hedges carved into the shapes of animals. The park was designed and laid out in 1881 by Ulhas Ghatkopar over Bombay's main reservoir, some say to cover the water from the potentially contaminating activity of the nearby Towers of Silence. When seen from the air, the walkway inside the park (Hanging Gardens Path), spell out the letters PMG (Pherozeshah Mehta Gardens) in cursive.

== Gallery ==
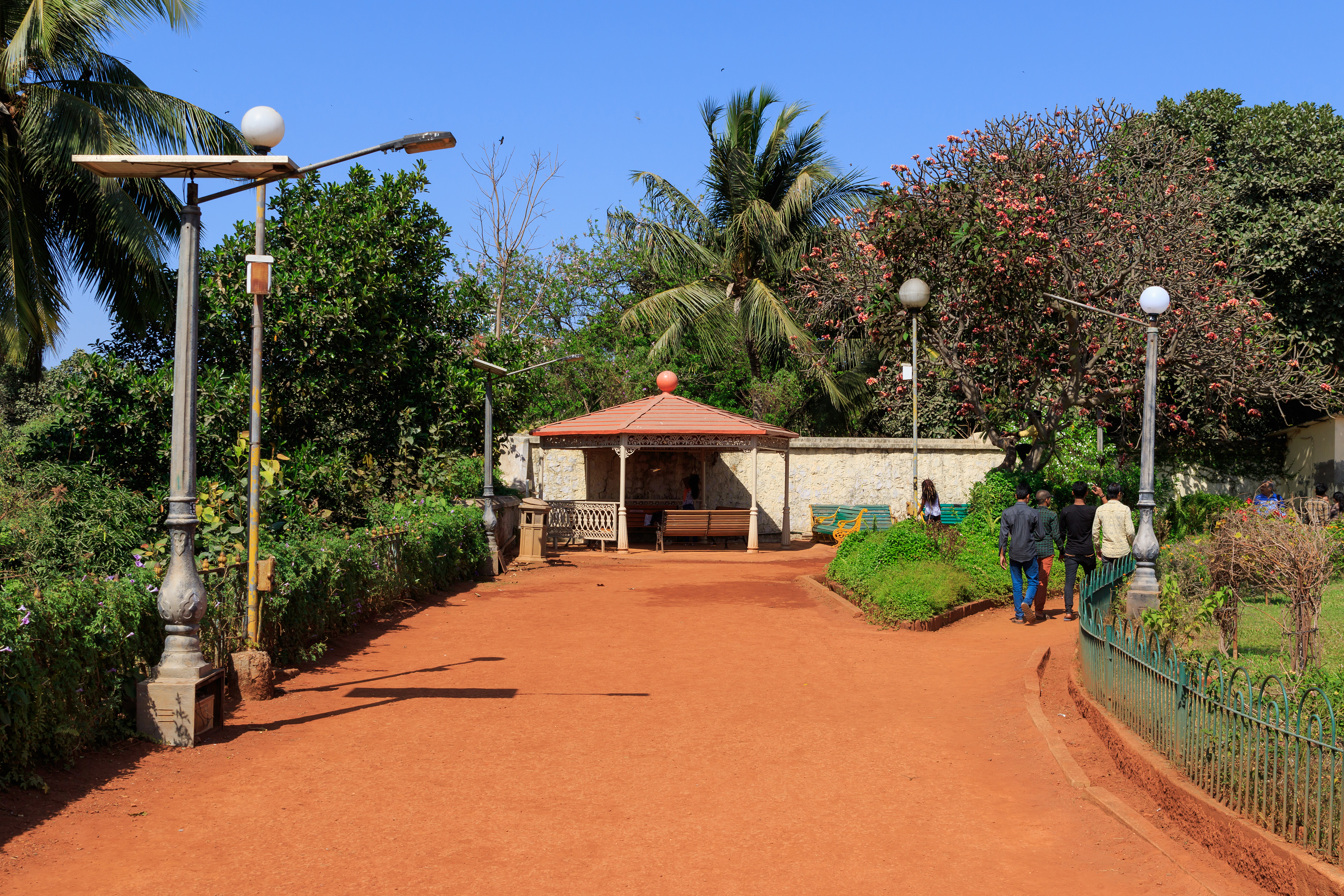
A pavilion in Hanging Garden of Mumbai

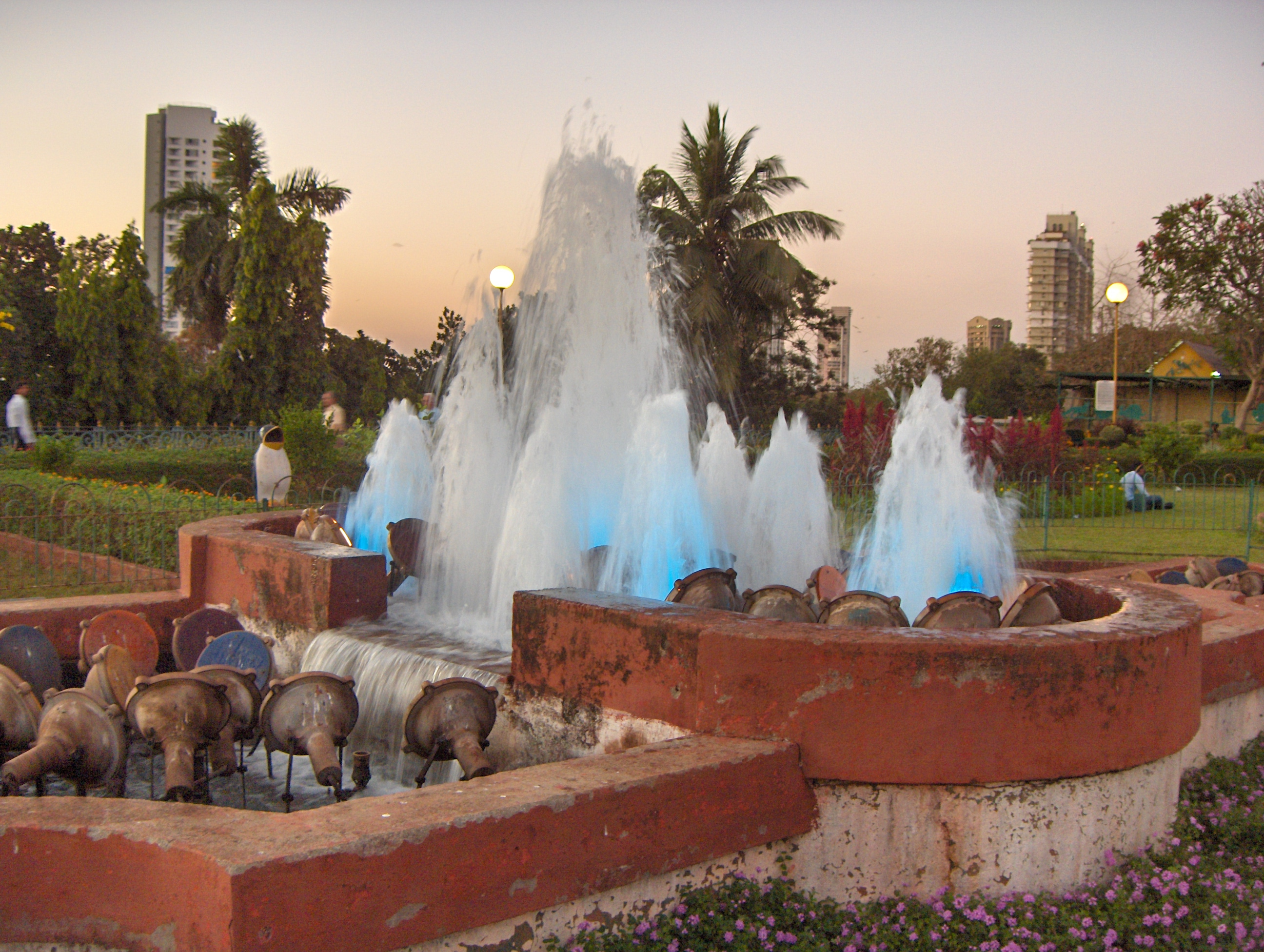
Fountains in Hanging Gardens of Mumbai

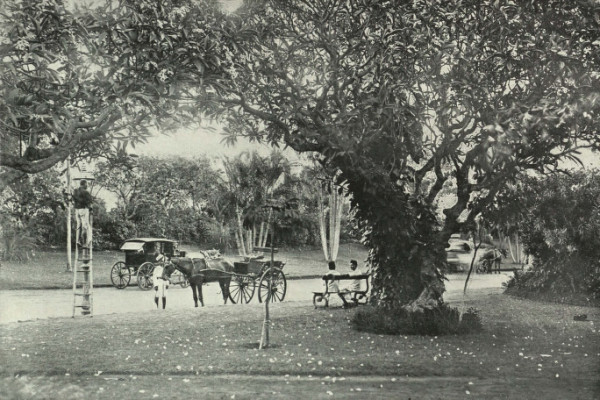
Hanging Gardens in Malabar Hill, c. 1991

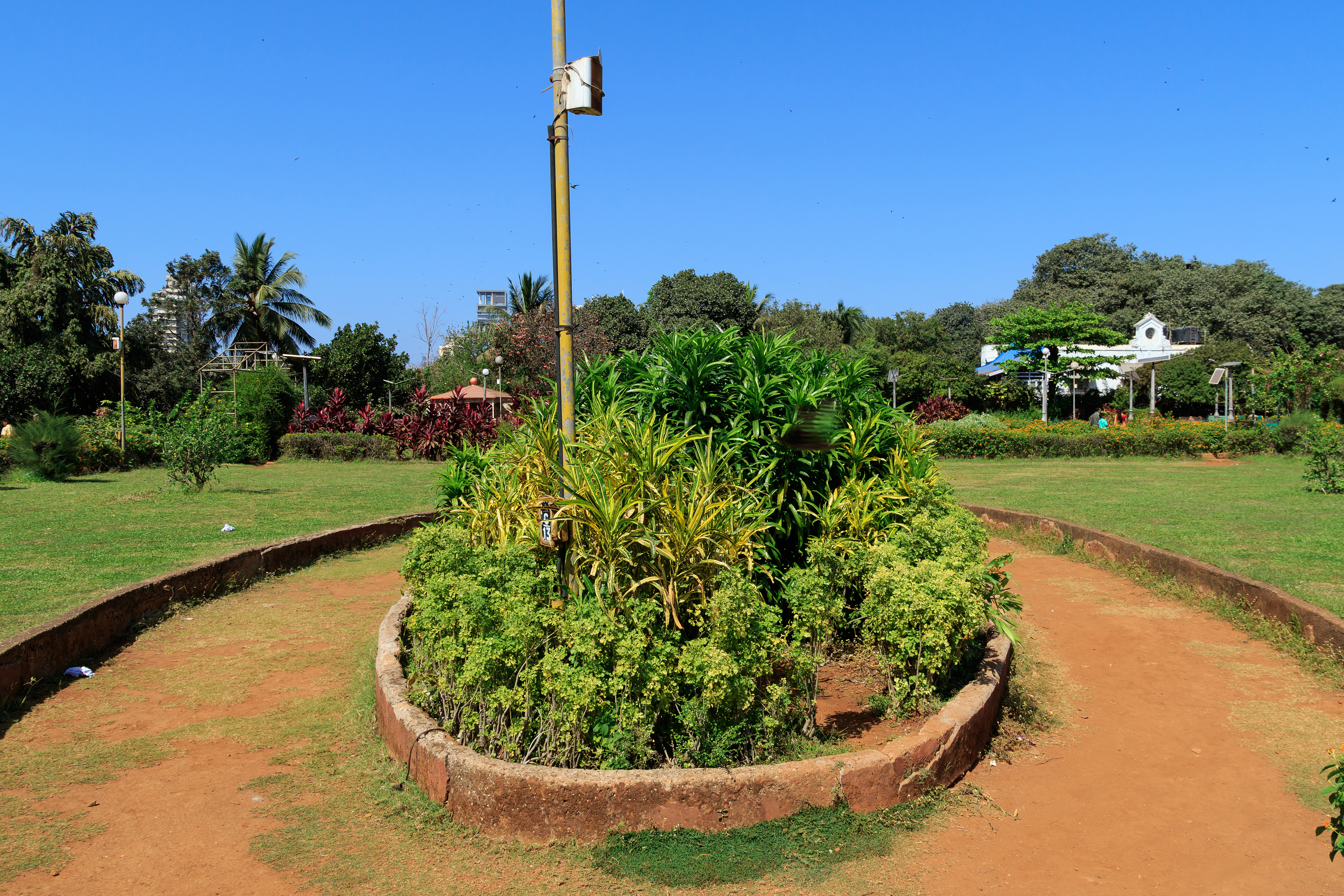
Hanging Gardens

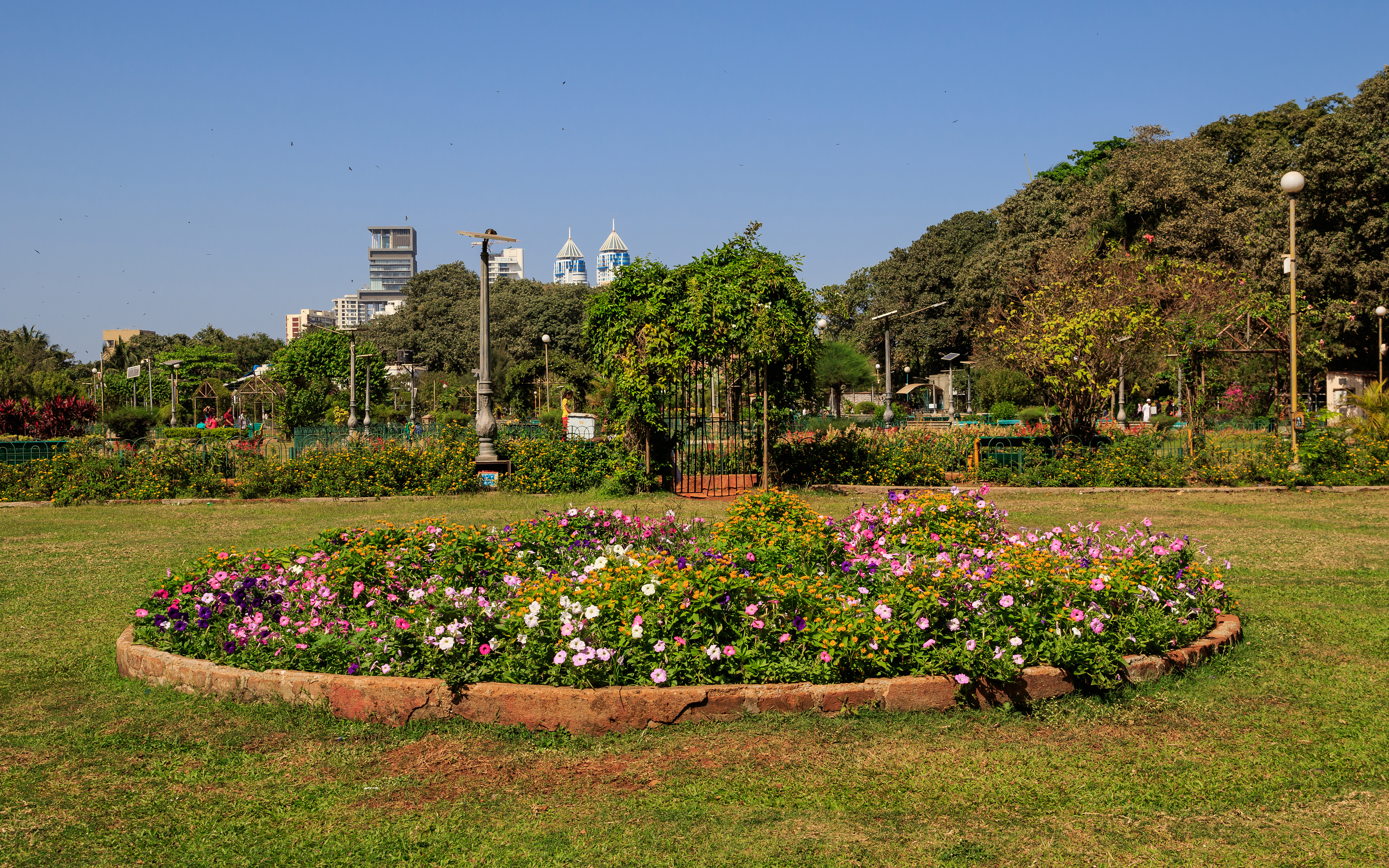
Shrubbery in the park

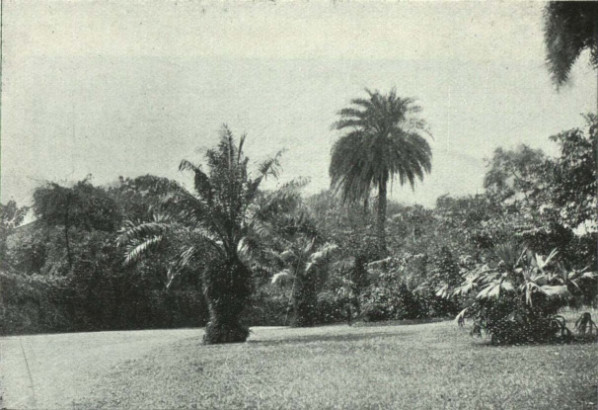
Hanging Gardens in Malabar Hill, c. 1905

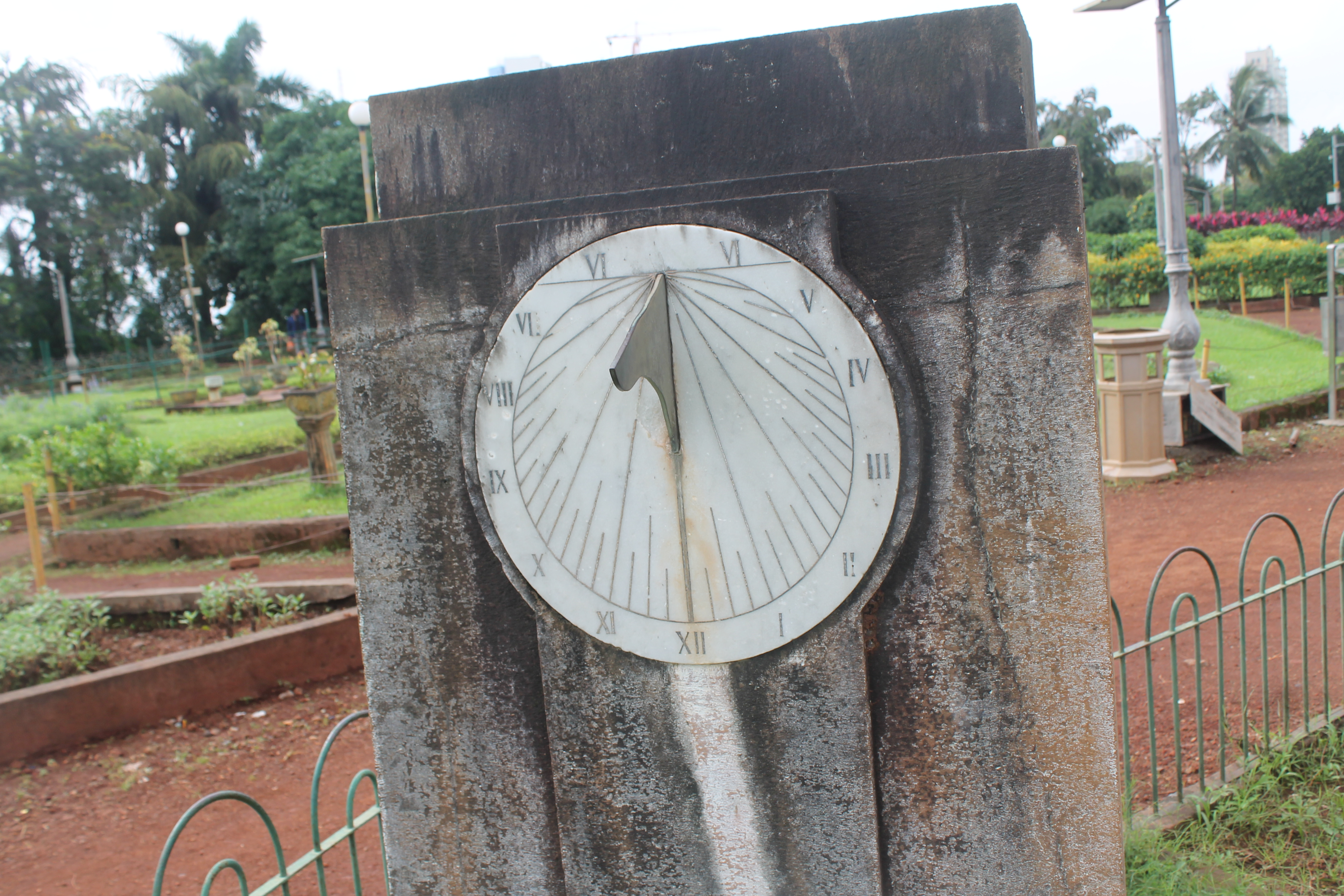
Sundial Clock in Hanging Gardens, Mumbai

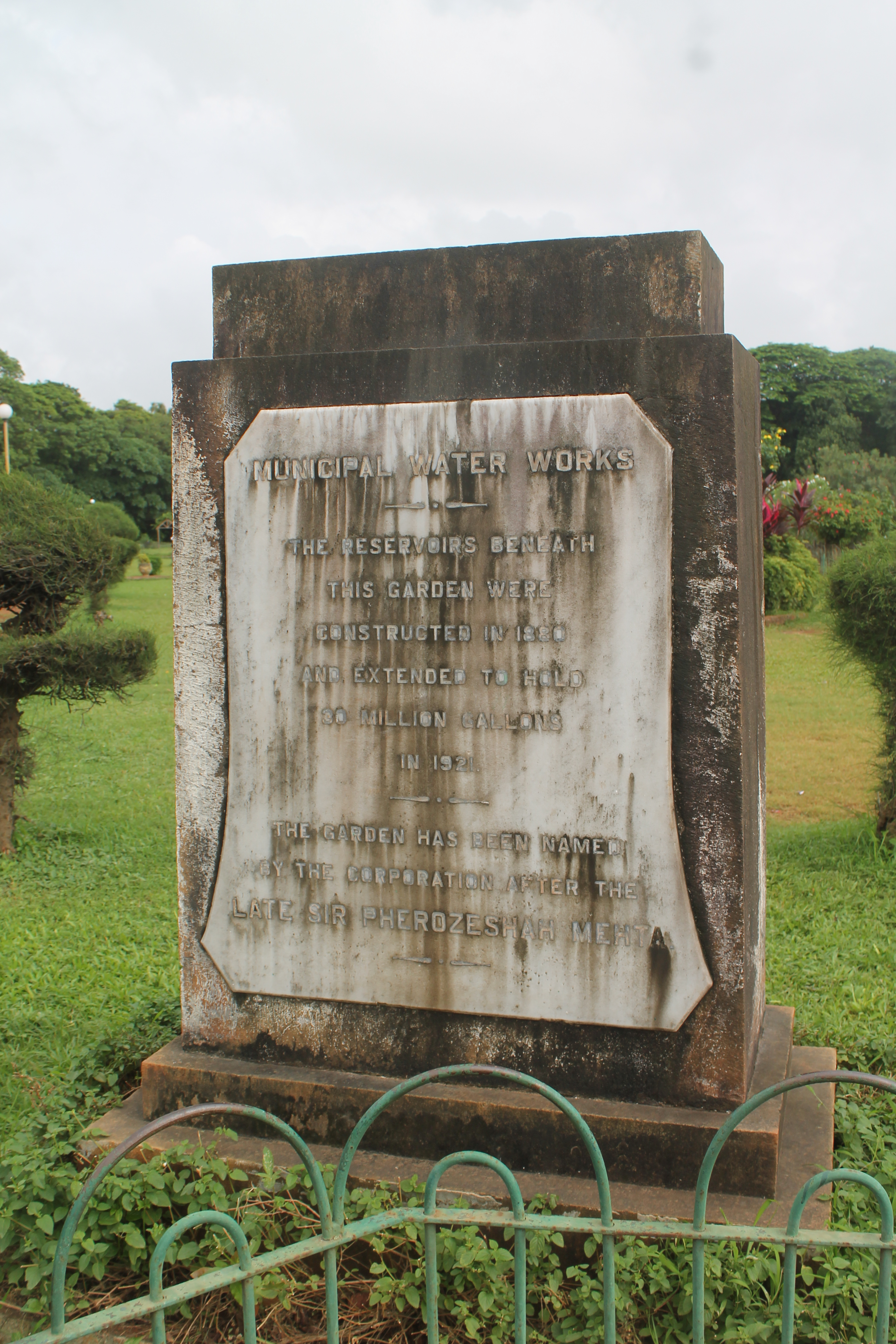
Stone Plaque in Hanging Gardens by Municipal Water Works, Mumbai deppicting naming of garden on Pherozeshah Mehta
