= Cosme Correa =

Portuguese nobleman

Cosme Correa (fl. 1540s) was a Portuguese nobleman. The island of Salsette in Bombay was divided into Malar and Marol and granted for three years to Cosme Correa along with João Rodrigues Dantas and Manuel Correa.
