= António Pessoa =

António Pessoa was a Portuguese soldier who had authority over Mazagaon, a huge island in Bombay from 1547 to 1571.
