= Sousa e Lima family =

The Sousa e Lima family were granted the possession of the Mazagaon island of Bombay. They had authority over the islands for several years until the British annexed it. The Portuguese Jesuits had set up their base at Mazagaon, and claimed ownership of the land. King Sebastian of Portugal refused to hand over the land to them, and in 1572 granted the island of Mazagaon in perpetuity to the Sousa e Lima family.
