= Manuel Corres =

Portuguese nobleman

Manuel Correa was a Portuguese nobleman. The island of Salsette in Bombay was divided into Malar and Marol and granted for three years to Manuel Correa along with Cosme Correa and João Rodrigues Dantas.
