= Manuel Serrão =

Portuguese nobleman

Manuel Serrão was a Portuguese nobleman. The villages of Parel, Wadala, Sion, and Worli in Bombay were granted to Manuel Serrão for 412 pardaos between 1545 and 1548, during the viceroyalty of João de Castro.
