= João Rodrigues Dantas =

Portuguese nobleman

João Rodrigues Dantas was a Portuguese nobleman. The island of Salsette in Bombay was divided into the provinces of Malar and Marol and granted for three years to João Rodrigues Dantas along with Cosme Corres and Manuel Corres.
