= Troubridge =

Troubridge may refer to:

== Persons ==
- Amelia Troubridge (born 1974), British photographer
- Edward Troubridge (c. 1787–1852), British Royal Navy rear admiral and politician
- Ernest Troubridge (1862–1926), British First World War Royal Navy admiral
- Laura, Lady Troubridge (1867–1946), British novelist
- Laura Troubridge (diarist) (1858–1929), British diarist, letter writer, and artist
- Thomas Troubridge (disambiguation), several people
- Una Vincenzo, Lady Troubridge (1887–1963), British translator, wife of Ernest

== Places ==
- Mount Troubridge, Victoria Land, Antarctica
- Troubridge Hill, South Australia
- Troubridge Island, South Australia
- Troubridge Point, South Australia
- Troubridge Shoals, South Australia

== Ships ==
- HMS Troubridge (R00), a Second World War British Royal Navy destroyer
- Hired armed ship Sir Thomas Troubridge or Troubridge, under contract with the Royal Navy from 1804 to 1806
- MV Troubridge, a South Australian ferry
- Lucy Maria (1801 ship), named Troubridge between 1806 and around 1815

== Other uses ==
- Troubridge baronets, a title in the Baronetage of Great Britain

== See also ==
- Trubridge, a list of people with the surname
- Trowbridge (disambiguation)
