= Thomas Troubridge (disambiguation) =

Thomas Troubridge may refer to:

- Sir Thomas Troubridge, 1st Baronet (c. 1758–1807), British admiral and First Naval Lord
- Sir Thomas Troubridge, 3rd Baronet (1815–1867), British Army officer
- Sir Thomas Troubridge, 4th Baronet (1860–1938) - see Troubridge baronets
- Sir Thomas Troubridge, 5th Baronet (1895–1963) - see Troubridge baronets
- Sir Thomas Troubridge, 7th Baronet (born 1955) - see Troubridge baronets
- Thomas Hope Troubridge (1895–1949), British admiral
- Thomas Troubridge (banker) (1939–2015), British banker, and first husband of Princess Michael of Kent

== See also ==
- Troubridge (disambiguation)
