= His Grace Gives Notice =

His Grace Gives Notice may refer to:

- His Grace Gives Notice (novel), a 1922 British novel by Laura Troubridge
- His Grace Gives Notice (1924 film), a British silent film adaptation
- His Grace Gives Notice (1933 film), a British sound film adaptation
