= Lady Troubridge =

Lady Troubridge may refer to:

- Una Vincenzo, Lady Troubridge (1887–1963), British sculptor and translator
- Laura Troubridge, Lady Troubridge (1867–1946), British novelist and etiquette writer
- Lady Troubridge, a British ship that was shipwrecked in 1815

== See also ==
- Troubridge (disambiguation)
