= Trowbridge (disambiguation) =

Trowbridge is the county town of Wiltshire, England.

Trowbridge may also refer to:

== People ==
- Trowbridge (surname)

== Places ==
Canada

- Trowbridge, Ontario

United Kingdom

- Trowbridge, Cardiff, Wales

United States

- Trowbridge, California
- Trowbridge, Michigan
- Trowbridge Park, Michigan
- Trowbridge Township, Michigan

== Other uses ==
- Trowbridge & Livingston, an architectural practice in New York City in the early 20th century
- Trowbridge Archeological Site, Kansas City, Kansas, United States
- Trowbridge House, historic house in Washington, D.C., United States
- Trowbridge's shrew

== See also ==
- Charles Trowbridge House, the oldest known structure in the city of Detroit
- Trubridge, a surname
- Troubridge (disambiguation)
