= SS Clan Ranald =

SS Clan Ranald is the name of the following ships for the Clan Line:

- SS Clan Ranald (1878), foundered 4 April 1901
- SS Clan Ranald (1900), capsized and sank 31 January 1909
- SS Clan Ranald (1917), sold to Malta and renamed Valetta City

== See also ==
- Ranald (disambiguation)
