= Laura Troubridge =

Laura Troubridge may refer to:

- Laura Troubridge, Lady Troubridge (née Gurney; 1867–1946), English novelist, peer, and etiquette writer
- Laura Troubridge (diarist) (1858–1929), British diarist, letter writer, and artist
