= Admiral Troubridge =

Admiral Troubridge may refer to:

- Edward Troubridge (c. 1787–1852), British Royal Navy rear admiral
- Ernest Troubridge (1862–1926), British Royal Navy admiral
- Sir Thomas Troubridge, 1st Baronet (1757–1807), British Royal Navy rear admiral
- Thomas Hope Troubridge (1895–1949), British Royal Navy vice admiral

== See also ==
- Richard Trowbridge (1920–2003), British Royal Navy rear admiral
