= Troubridge Hill Aquatic Reserve =

Protected area in South Australia

- IUCN category VI (protected area with sustainable use of natural resources)
- Location within South Australia
- Location: South Australia
- Nearest city: Edithburgh
- Coordinates: 35.1742°S 137.6453°E
- Area: 4.83 km^{2} (1.86 sq mi)
- Established: 28 June 1984
- Governing body: Primary Industries and Regions SA

Troubridge Hill Aquatic Reserve is a marine protected area in the Australian state of South Australia located in Investigator Strait adjoining the south coast of Yorke Peninsula at the headland of Troubridge Hill.

It was declared in 1984 for the "protection of marine habitat and associated organisms and for education and recreation purposes". The collection or removal of any marine organism is prohibited with the exception of organisms collected by line fishing. The following activities are permitted - boating, recreational diving and swimming. The aquatic reserve extends seaward for a distance of about 1.6 kilometres (0.99 miles) from the coastline between Suicide Point to the west of Troubridge Hill to a point on the coast about 1 kilometre (0.62 miles) east of Troubridge Hill. The wreck site of SS Clan Ranald is located within the aquatic reserve.

Since 2012, it has been located within the boundaries of a habitat protection zone within the Lower Yorke Peninsula Marine Park.

The aquatic reserve is classified as an IUCN Category VI protected area.

== See also ==
- Protected areas of South Australia
- Troubridge (disambiguation)
