= Balranald (disambiguation) =

Balranald may refer to:

== Places ==
=== Scotland ===
- Balranald, a bay and estate in North Uist, Outer Hebrides, Scotland, once the seat of the MacDonalds of Griminis
- Balranald Nature Reserve, an RSPB reserve on the north west coast of North Uist, Outer Hebrides, Scotland

=== Australia ===
- Balranald, a town and local government area in the Riverina district of New South Wales, named after the estate in North Uist, Outer Hebrides, Scotland
- Balranald Shire, a local government area in the Riverina area of western New South Wales
- Electoral district of Balranald, an NSW electoral district for the state assembly
- Balranald Bridge, over the Murrumbidgee River on the Sturt Highway at Balranald, NSW
- Balranald railway line, a Victorian Railways broad gauge line, now closed, that ran to Balranald, New South Wales
- Balranald Airport, a small airport located northeast of Balranald, New South Wales

== Other uses ==
- Balranald Football Club, an Australian football club competing in the Central Murray Football League. The club is based in the town of Balranald, New South Wales

== See also ==
- Ranald (disambiguation)
- Bal (disambiguation)
