= SS Clan Ranald (1900) =

Turret deck steamship that sank off the Yorke Peninsula, South Australia

Coordinates: 35°10′3.7″S 137°37′14.8″E

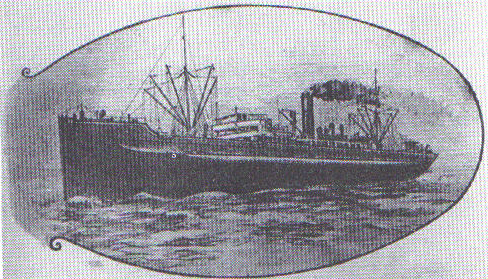
- Clan Ranald

History

United Kingdom
- Name: Clan Ranald
- Namesake: Clan Macdonald of Clanranald
- Owner: Clan Line Steamers Ltd
- Operator: Cayzer, Irvine & Co
- Port of registry: Glasgow
- Builder: William Doxford & Sons, Sunderland
- Yard number: 279
- Launched: 31 July 1900
- Completed: September 1900
- Identification: UK official number 111290; code letters RTWN
- Fate: capsized 31 January 1909

General characteristics
- Type: turret deck ship
- Tonnage: 3,596 GRT, 2,285 NRT
- Length: 355.0 ft (108.2 m)
- Beam: 45.6 ft (13.9 m)
- Depth: 24.7 ft (7.5 m)
- Decks: 2
- Installed power: 342 NHP, 2,080 IHP
- Propulsion: 1 × triple expansion engine; 1 × screw
- Sail plan: 2-masted schooner
- Crew: 64
- Notes: sister ship: Clan Gordon

SS Clan Ranald is a steamship wreck off the coast of South Australia that is of unique historic importance. She is the only example in Australian waters of a turret deck ship: a type of steel-hulled cargo ship with an unusual hull shape that was built in the 1890s and 1900s.

William Doxford & Sons in England built her in 1900 for Clan Line, which operated the largest fleet of turret deck ships in the World. She capsized in 1909 off the Yorke Peninsula, with the loss of 40 of her 64 crew. Her wreck is protected by the federal Underwater Cultural Heritage Act 2018.

This is the second of four Clan Line ships that were called Clan Ranald. The first was a steamship built for Charles Cayzer in 1878. Cayzer sold her in 1900, she was renamed Ranald, and sank in 1901. The third was a steamship built for Clan Line in 1917 and sold in 1947. She was renamed Valetta City in 1948 and La Valetta in 1951, and was scrapped in 1958. The fourth was a refrigerated cargo motor ship built in 1965. She became Union-Castle Line's Dover Castle in 1977 and was renamed Dover Universal in 1979. She was sold and renamed Golden Sea in 1981, and scrapped in 1985.

== Building ==
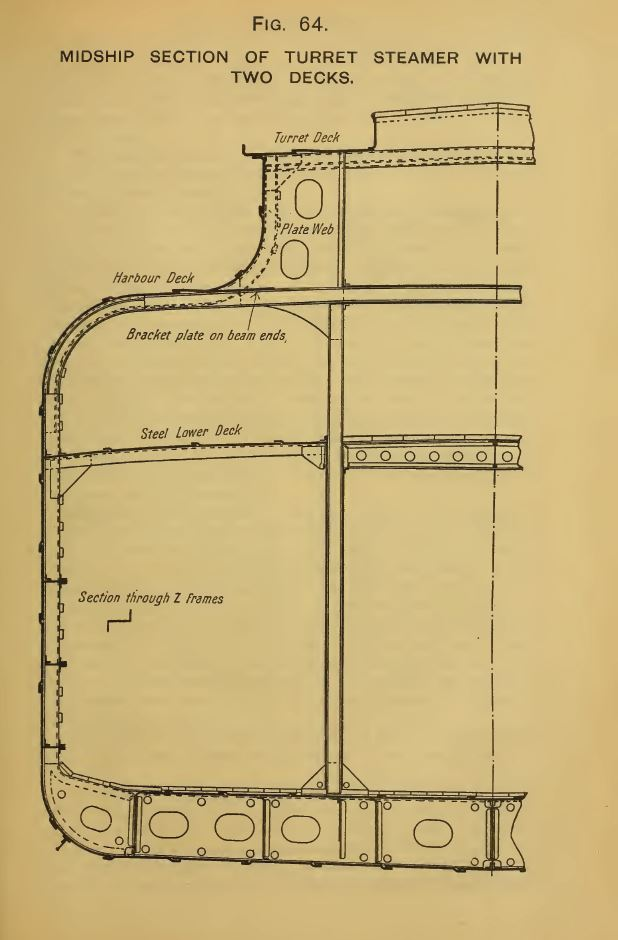
Cross-section of one side of a turret deck ship amidships

Doxford built the first turret deck ship in 1893. They were intended to be stronger and stabler than conventional cargo steamships. Their unique feature was that above the waterline the side of the hull curved in to form a horizontal ledge, and then curved vertical again to form the freeboard to the deck. The narrowness of the deck also meant that turret deck ships paid lower port charges and Suez Canal dues.

Clan Line started chartering turret deck ships in 1896 and buying them in 1898. Clan Ranald was one of a pair that Doxford built for Clan Line in 1900. Clan Gordon was yard number 277, launched on 12 May and completed that June. Clan Ranald was yard number 279, launched on 31 July and completed that September. Clan Gordon and Clan Ranald were Clan Line's smallest turret deck ships: only 355.0 ft (108.2 m) long and 45.6 ft (13.9 m) beam.

Clan Ranald's tonnages were 3,596 GRT and 2,285 NRT. She had a three-cylinder triple expansion engine that was rated at 342 NHP or 2,080 IHP and drove a single screw. She was registered at Glasgow. Her UK official number was 111290 and her code letters were RTWN.

== Loss ==
Clan Ranald left Mauritius on 24 December 1908 and reached Port Adelaide on 15 January 1909. At Darling's Mill she loaded 39,862 bags of wheat and 28, 451 bags of flour. She had 466 tons of coal in her bunkers and another 170 tons on deck. 50 tons were on her weather deck, 50 on her starboard turret deck and 20 on her port turret deck. This seems to have contributed to a four degree list to starboard.

On 31 January Clan Ranald left Semaphore Anchorage for South Africa. She was crewed by 64 officers and men. Her Master was Captain Arthur Gladstone. Her officers were British and nearly all of her crew were lascars, including at least four from Manila in the Philippines and at least 16 from Calcutta in British India.

At 1400 hrs Clan Ranald was south of Troubridge Island when suddenly her starboard list increased to 45 degrees. Her crew rushed on deck, leaving her engine running. The starboard side of her deck was submerged and her rudder was clear of the ocean surface.

At 1630 hrs a rough wind blew the ship toward Troubridge Hill. A rough sea destroyed her lifeboats and drove her near cliffs. With no other means of escape, her crew tried to make rafts from wooden débris. Clan Ranald's crew sighted another steamship, British India SN Co's Uganda, nearby, so they fired distress rockets. Uganda saw the rockets but did not come to assist.

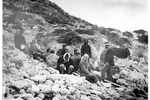
Some of the survivors from Clan Ranald

At 2200 hrs Clan Ranald capsized about 770 yards (700 m) from the shore and sank in about 60 feet (18 m) of water. Some of her crew were drowned as she sank, and others died of injuries or cold while trying to swim to the shore, which consisted of cliffs and jagged rocks. Residents of Troubridge Island had seen the rockets, came to the shore and helped survivors.

== Survivors and fatalities ==
The dead included Captain Gladstone, five of his officers and 34 crewmen. 24 men survived: the Chief Officer, Third Officer, Second Engineer, ship's carpenter and 20 crewmen.

At daybreak they were transferred to Edithburgh on the mainland. The officers and carpenter were British; the other 20 survivors were lascars. The officers were accommodated in Woodcock's Royal Arms Hotel, and the lascars were held in the basement of the Prince Alfred Sailors' Home. Under the White Australia policy, each lascar's hand print was taken and he was given a dictation test, which was rigged to ensure all 20 of them failed. As a result all the lascars were detained as illegal immigrants under the Immigration Restriction Act 1901.

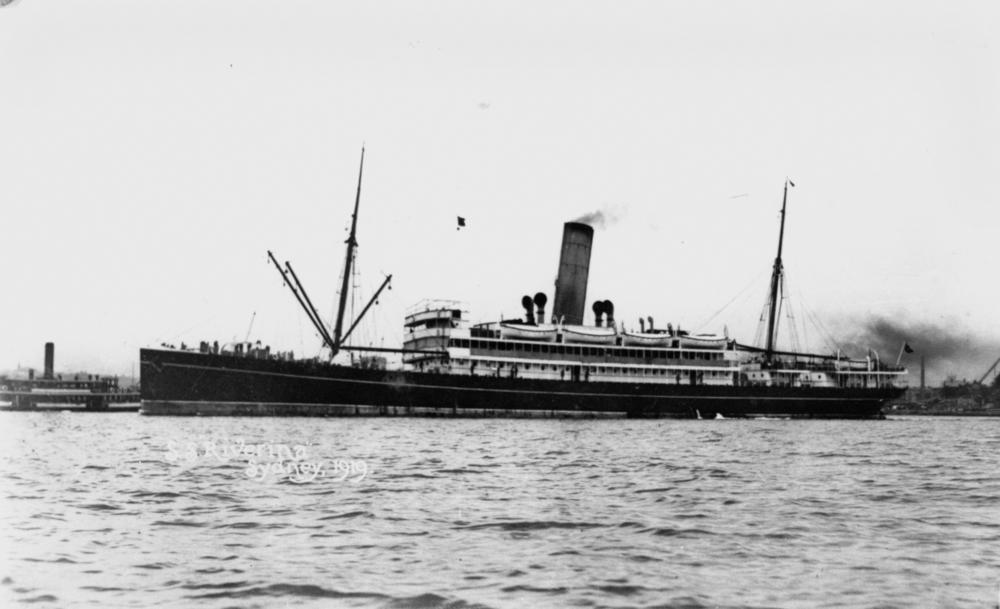
Huddart, Parker's coastal passenger ship Riverina took the surviving lascars from Port Adelaide to Melbourne

People in Adelaide gave the lascars food, clothes and cigarettes while they were custody. A Clan Ranald Relief Fund was set up. Some of the money that it raised was given to the lascars. On 4 February the lascars were put on Huddart, Parker's coastal passenger ship Riverina, which took them to Melbourne. There they were to join Clan Line's Clan MacLachlan, which would take them to Colombo in Ceylon. Before they left, the Mayor of Port Adelaide gave each lascar one and a half sovereigns (£1 10s) and wished them well.

On 6 February the Mayor of Port Adelaide entertained the four British survivors. He announced that each of them was to be given £10 13s 6d from the relief fund.

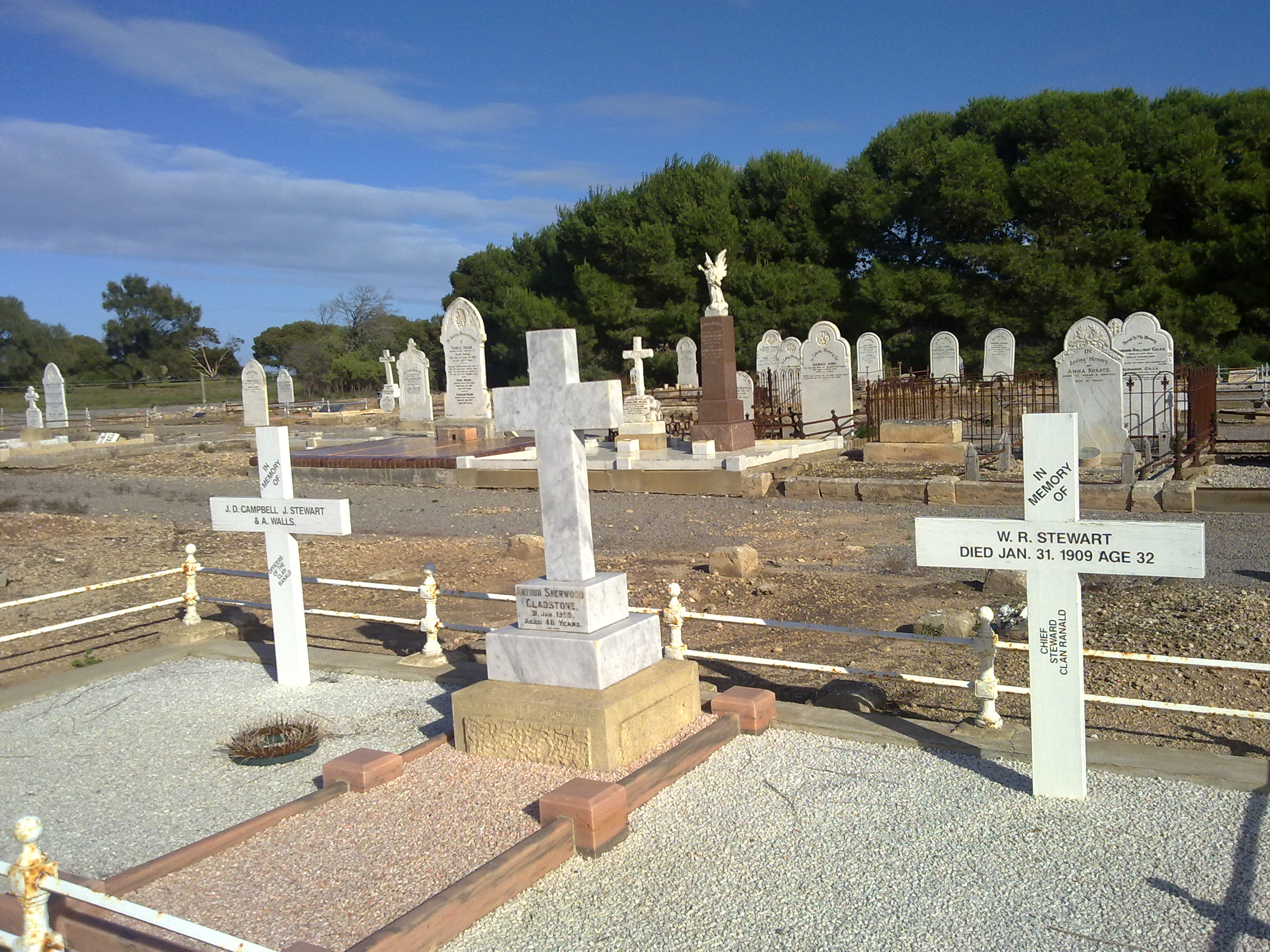
Graves at Edithburgh of Clan Ranald's officers. Captain Gladstone is in the centre. On the right is his Chief Steward. On the left, three other officers share a single grave.

The sinking killed 40 of Clan Ranald's crew. 36 bodies were recovered, some of them battered beyond recognition. They were buried in Edithburgh Cemetery. The five British officers are buried in three graves in the main part of the cemetery, but the 31 lascars were given a mass grave at the rear of the cemetery. On the centenary of the shipwreck, 31 January 2009, a monument was installed on the mass grave recording the names of the 34 lascars who died, including those whose bodies were either not found or not identified.

== Inquiry ==
In February 1909 the local Marine Board investigated both the sinking of the ship and the rescue of survivors. Uganda's Master, Captain Kilpatrick, was asked why his ship did not come to help when Clan Ranald fired distress rockets. Kilpatrick replied that he thought Troubridge Island Lighthouse fired the rockets, and they were not distress signals. Yet island residents recognised the rockets as distress signals, and one of them claimed that Uganda replied by signal lamp.

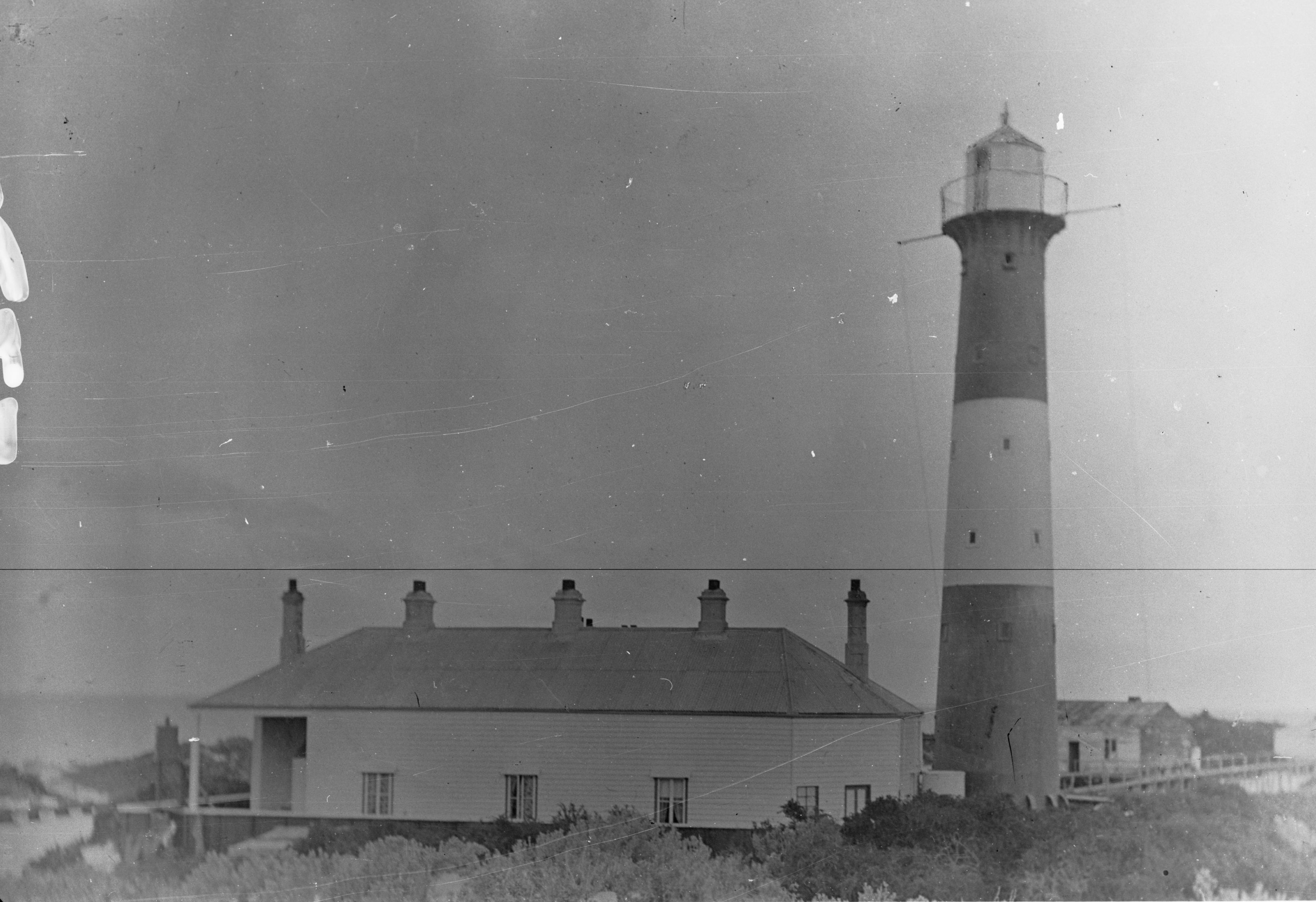
Troubridge Island Lighthouse in 1902

The sudden increase in Clan Ranald's list remains unexplained. A diver, C Olsen, inspected Clan Ranald's wreck for the Marine Board only days after she sank. He found Clan Ranald "lying on her starboard side, and with the top of her turret deck also resting on the bottom, that is to say, partly bottom-up, the flat of her port side being about 30 degrees past the horizontal. The highest part of the ship is her port bilge keel. The starboard bilge keel is about 9 feet off the bottom. The starboard top sides and the top of the turret had sunk some distance into sand. I carefully inspected the starboard bilge the whole length of the ship, but could see no sign of any damage whatever."

The lack of damage to the hull rules out the suggestion that she was damaged by any underwater obstruction, such as the nearby Marion Reef. Other theories to explain her demise include failure to empty her ballast tanks, or one of her seacocks being opened.

== Location and salvage ==
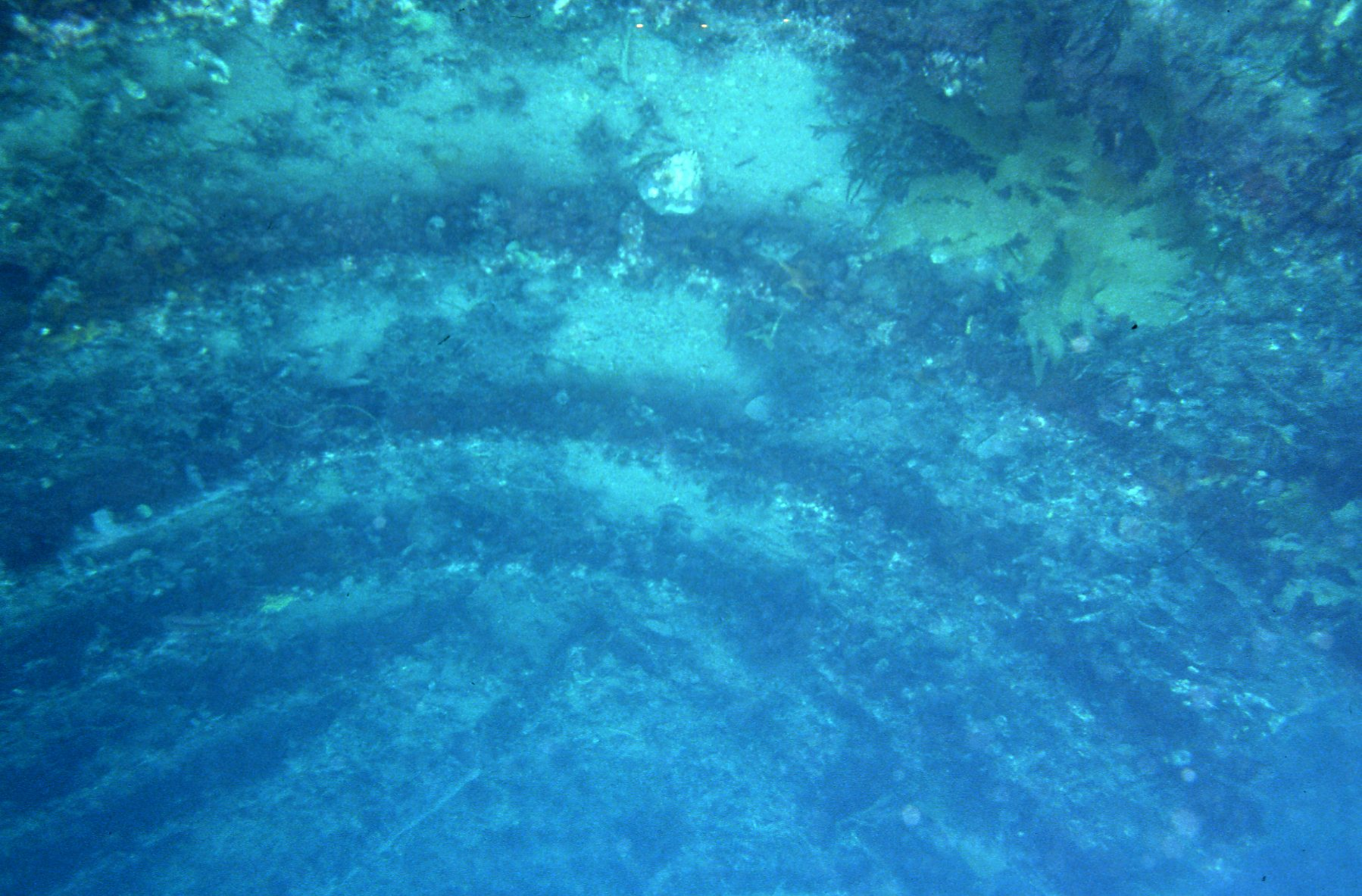
Part of the wreck in 1980

Volunteers from the South Australian Museum Underwater Historical Research Group rediscovered the wreck in 1962. They reported that the wreck was remarkably well-preserved at the time. The wreck is off the south coast of the Yorke Peninsula, about 7.6 nautical miles (14 km) southwest of Edithburgh and 0.67 nautical miles (1.25 km) west of Troubridge Hill.

The wreck has never been formally salvaged. However, since the advent of recreational scuba diving in the 1960s, divers have looted non-ferrous metal from the wreck such as copper pipes from her boilers and personal artefacts. Some looters used explosives on the wreck, which damaged the blades of her propeller. Clan Ranald's manifest is rumoured to have been recovered from the beach shortly after she sank, and is said now to be privately owned by a resident of Edithburgh.

== Condition and conservation ==
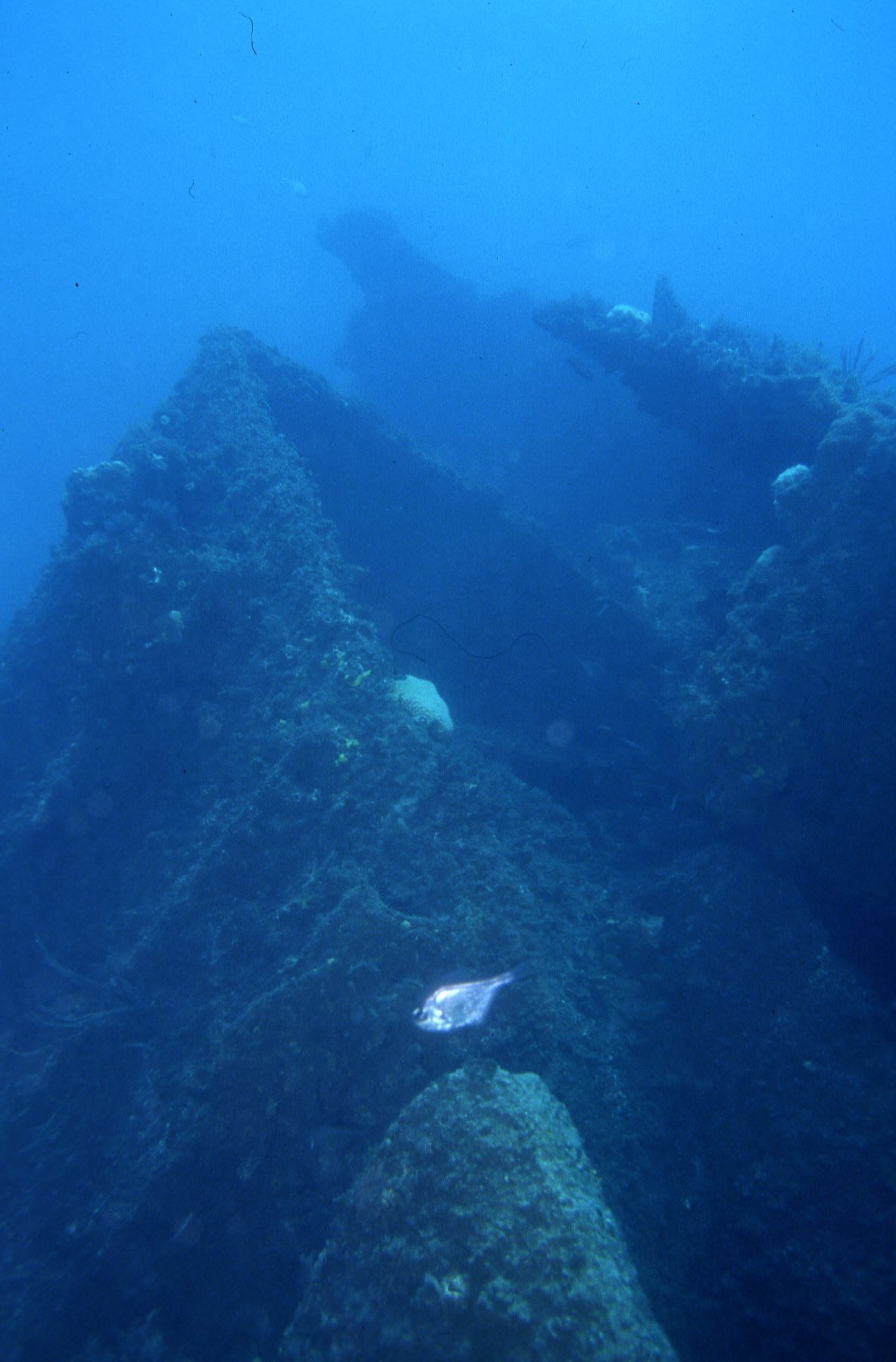
Another part of the wreck in 1980

Despite more than a century underwater, and human interference in recent decades, much of the wreck remains. The hull lies on a sandy seabed with its bow pointing east-southeast. It has collapsed entirely, except for the part held up by the starboard boiler. The port boiler has rolled free and lies separate from the hull. Each boiler is two or three times the size of a human diver.

The bow stands vertical, and the bow section has collapsed into two parts. A windlass and a mound of chain remain in the bow area. The remains of the propeller remain on site, and its shaft is visible in the collapsed hull. The rudder is detached from the stern, but remains on site. The highest part of the wreck is the port bilge keel and double-bottomed hull. It stands 20 feet (6 m) above the seabed, held up by the starboard boiler.

Despite the large amount of wreckage, South Australia's Department for Environment and Water (DEW) classifies the site as poorly preserved. The hull is intact to the turn of the bilge, but the frames and plates of her hull have collapsed. The stern and bow may still be intact and the vessel's boilers or engines are still in their position in relation to where they were originally on the vessel.

The environmental state of the site is stable, and the DEW considers the wreck to be at low risk from natural damage. However, it considers there to be a high risk of human damage. Some artefacts attractive to looters are visible and at risk of being looted. Anchors of ships and boats anchoring in the area have damaged the wreck, and there is a risk of this happening again. There is also a risk of overfishing depleting marine life at the site.

== Significance ==
Clan Ranald is notable both for its high loss of life and its unique place in Australian maritime archaeology. In 1909 a poet called Archibald Deacon wrote about the loss:

=== The Wreck of the "Clan Ranald" ===
Down the Port River, on a mid-summer day
The steamer, Clan Ranald, swept proudly away.
Bound for the Cape, with a light-hearted crew
What was in store for them God alone knew.

At 'four bells' she was struck by a big angry sea,
She listed right over; her decks washed a-lea.
She was crippled — and signalled for help to the shore,
But ere it arrived the ship was no more.

Down went the Clan Ranald, a most sad disaster,
For forty poor souls were called to their Master.
Rescuers on shore all help they were giving,
They were risking their lives for the sake of those living.

For, in utter darkness they were battling that night
In surf they were rushing to save, black and white.
Let us pity those living, and pray for those still,
Who were washed to Eternity off Troubridge Hill.

== Monument ==
One of Clan Ranald's anchors was recovered by the crew of a vessel called the Para Star. In 1975 it was mounted as a monument on the cliffs near where the ship sank, with a plaque recording both the loss of Clan Ranald and the recovery of the anchor.

== Legal status ==
After it rediscovered the wreck in 1962, the South Australian Museum Underwater Research Group bought the wreck from Clan Line in order to protect it. In 1976 the Federal Parliament passed the Historic Shipwrecks Act, which protected wrecks such as Clan Ranald. The site and all artefacts in it are historic and legally protected. It is unlawful to either damage the site or remove any artefact from it.

In 1982 the Parliament of South Australia passed the Fisheries Act, and in 1984 it created the Troubridge Hill Aquatic Reserve under the Act. The reserve covers about 4 square kilometres (1.5 sq mi) and includes the wreck. This prohibits any human activity that removes marine life from the wreck or the surrounding seabed.

In 1988 the Underwater Research Group transferred ownership of the wreck to the Government of South Australia. In 2018 the Federal Parliament passed the Underwater Cultural Heritage Act, which supersedes the Historic Shipwrecks Act 1976 and now protects the wreck.

== Wreck diving ==
Clan Ranald is a major feature of the DEW's "Investigator Strait Shipwreck Heritage Trail". The DEW publicises the wrecks on this trail to educate the public about South Australia's historic shipwrecks.

Clan Ranald lies at a depth of 60 feet (18 m) and visibility is about 33 feet (10 m). The best time to dive is between February and April, with a northerly wind prevailing.

== Sources ==
- Attorney-General's Department. "South Australian Legislation". Government of South Australia.
- Brooks, David (2004). Before the wreck: The Adoption of Racially Exclusive Immigration Restrictions in South Australia Leading to the 'Prohibited Immigrant' Status of the 'Coloured' Crew of the SS Clan Ranald, 1857–1909. University of Adelaide. (unpublished thesis)
- Christopher, Peter (2009). Australian Shipwrecks. A Pictorial History. Stepney, SA: Axiom Publishing. ISBN 978-1-8647658-8-5.
- Clarkson, John; Fenton, Roy; Munro, Archie (2007). Clan Line Illustrated Fleet History. Preston: Ships in Focus. ISBN 978-1-901703-47-4.
- Coroneos, Cosmos; McKinnon, Robert (1997). Shipwrecks of the Investigator Strait and the Lower Yorke Peninsula. ISBN 0-9588496-3-3.
- Department of Customs (1909). D596/0; 1909/687: The Wreck of the Clan Ranald. National Archives of Australia.
- Department of Environment and Natural Resources (2001). South Australian Shipwrecks; Investigator Strait Maritime Heritage Trail; The Clan Ranald, 1900-1909 (PDF). Adelaide: Government of South Australia.
- Department of Environment and Natural Resources. unpublished reports re the 'SS Clan Ranald'. Adelaide: Government of South Australia.
- Darby, John (1909). {No. 7258.) "Clan Ranald" (S.S.) (PDF). London: Board of Trade – via Southampton City Council.
- Halls, Chris (1978). Australia's Worst Shipwrecks. Adelaide: Rigby. ISBN 978-0-7270-0949-4.
- Loney, Jack (1993). Wrecks on the South Australian Coast. Yarram: Lonestone Press. ISBN 978-0-646-147444.
- Lloyd's Register of British and Foreign Shipping. Vol. I.–Steamers. London: Lloyd's Register of Shipping. 1901 – via Internet Archive.
- Mercantile Navy List. London. 1902 – via Crew List Index Project.
- Russell, Smith (1998). Curiosities of South Australia. Adelaide: Smith Books. ISBN 978-1-876087-142.
- Steinberg, David (2001). The Historic Shipwreck Australian: A Plan of Management (PDF). Magnet Research Report No.9. Darwin: Department of Arts & Museum of the Northern Territory. Archived from the original (PDF) on 28 March 2012.
