= Laura Troubridge (diarist) =

British diarist, letter-writer, artist and illustrator (1858–1929)

Laura Elizabeth Rachel Troubridge (1858 – 15 March 1929) was a British diarist, letter-writer, artist and illustrator. A professional artist from an aristocratic background, she was known for her portraits of Queen Victoria and her family, and paintings of children and fairy subjects, generally in watercolour and pastel. Her book illustrations were admired by Oscar Wilde and Charles Dodgson. In 1966, her journals, giving an insight into Victorian life; and in 2000 correspondence with her fiancé during the period of their engagement, were published.

== Life ==
Laura Elizabeth Rachel Troubridge was born in 1858 in Chiswick, Middlesex, England and baptised on 16 September 1858 in Turnham Green, Hounslow. She was sister to Thomas Herbert Cochrane Troubridge, 4th Baronet and sister-in-law to Lady Laura Troubridge and Una Vincenzo, Lady Troubridge.

In 1867, her parents, Louise and Sir Thomas Troubridge, died within a few weeks of each other and as an orphan she and her siblings went to live at North Runcton Hall in Norfolk with their grandfather, Daniel Gurney. Her grandfather's sisters, one of them Elizabeth Fry, had kept journals and it was these that inspired Troubridge to keep her own journals from 1873. Troubridge was an aspiring young artist and 1879 she wrote in her journal "To the National Gallery…Met Tardy and went together to tea at Oscar Wilde's – great fun, lots of vague 'intense' men, such differs, who amused us awfully." She lived with her grandfather until 1880. In 1966, her journals were published as: Life Amongst the Troubridges: Journals of a Young Victorian, 1873-84.

She and Adrian Charles Frances Hope were engaged in 1884. But the young couple were not able to marry because of Hope's difficulties in finding a job that would support them both. They kept up almost daily correspondence. In their letters they wrote to each other about both public and private occasions in London and Norfolk and beyond. For example, after a dinner at Mary Molesworth's her fiancé writes to her "Mrs. Molesworth urged me to throw everything to the winds and marry you at once." Their correspondence was published posthumously as the book: Letters of Engagement, 1884-1888: The Love Letters of Adrian Hope and Laura Troubridge.

They were finally able to marry in 1888. From this time she was frequently referred to as Mrs. Adrian Hope. For the first years they were living in Bradgate House, Ratby. After St.Philip and St. James' Church was restored, they donated a 'handsome brass eagle lectern' and inserted three stained glass windows in the chancel 'at the cost of Mr. Adrian Hope.' Hope secured a position as Secretary of Great Ormond Street Hospital and in 1892 they purchased More House, 34 Tite Street, Chelsea, London which the Hope-Nicholson family continued to live in for a century. Tite Street was a hub of artistic and literary activity at the time. Residents included Oscar Wilde, James McNeill Whistler, Dante Gabriel Rossetti and Edward Coley Burne-Jones. Troubridge and her husband eventually became the guardians of Oscar Wilde's two children with Constance Lloyd after his imprisonment for "gross indecency" in 1895. In a 1997 stage production at the Odyssey Theatre written by Ronda Spinak 'Oscar Wilde's Wife', Troubridge was played by Stacy Rukeyser.

In 1898, she was witness during the trial of the death of Uzielli by Dr. Collins. Troubridge testified that Collins 'had once saved her life' and that she was the 'innocent cause' of Collins being accused of murder as Troubridge had introduced Uzielli to him. Uzielli had fallen pregnant and didn't want anymore children so she turned to her friend, Troubridge, who had known her intimately for almost two years. Troubridge, who had been a patient of Collins, suggested Uzielli consult him as he was well known in her circle as an expert abortion care provider. Troubridge wrote a note to Collins requesting an appointment for Uzielli. Collins induced Uzielli's abortion and fatal peritonitis followed. Collins was put on trial for Uzielli's murder, but the jury found him guilty of manslaughter.

Troubridge's husband died in 1904 after an operation for appendicitis. They had two daughters. The following year their younger daughter, Esme, at the age of 7 died of diphtheria. Troubridge and her older daughter, Jacqueline, were left in 'much reduced circumstances' so Troubridge let More House and relocated to Beaulieu, Hampshire where her brother and his family lived. In 1915, they moved back to More House where Troubridge lived for the remainder of her life. Her daughter married Hedley Hope-Nicholson in London in 1916.

Her interests and talents were not limited to drawing and painting. She was actively involved in amateur theatricals, as was her sister and daughter. In 1891, Troubridge and the Hon. Mrs. Sterling held a concert in the Royal Opera House, Leicester, with the aim of raising money for the Children's Hospital and Infirmary. "The programme was long and attractive, and included, besides vocal and instrumental music, some clever recitations by the Misses Webling." She wrote plays, such as The Enchanted Wood, poems and manuscript music. She was on the Executive Committee and Dress Committee of the Chelsea Historical Pageant. In 1909 she and Lady Helen Forbes organised a matinee at the Court Theatre in aid of the All Saints Mission, Pentonville. The theatre programme included two plays written by Troubridge: The Orange Tree and The Cunning of Pat.

She died, aged 71, in Chelsea on 15 March 1929. Sometime after her death the houses on Tite Street were renumbered and the address of More House changed from number 34 to 52 Tite Street.

== Career ==
Troubridge showed an early aptitude and passion for drawing and painting and became a well-regarded portrait painter and illustrator. Her success has been likened to be of a similar kind enjoyed by her friend, Mary Louisa Molesworth.

She was a professional artist from an aristocratic background; she had painted the children of the royal family, illustrated one of Mrs. Molesworth's books, and enjoyed a busy and fashionable married life. - Mary Sebag-Montefiore

Her works are attributed to, or by, her various names or a combination of those names: Laura Troubridge; Laura Trowbridge, Laura Elizabeth Rachel Troubridge; Laura Hope; Laura Elizabeth Rachel Hope; Laura Troubridge Hope; Mrs. Adrian C. Hope; and, Mrs. Adrian Hope.

=== Artist ===
She was a watercolour and pastel artist who exhibited at the principal London galleries. She was known for her portraits of Queen Victoria and her family, and, paintings of children and fairy subjects. On the reverse of two pastels by Troubridge, Margaret and Wanderers, was the same newspaper cutting.

The newspaper cutting on the verso states that she studied painting in London, being advised by John Millais, and working in Mr. Cope's studio, and exhibited at the New Gallery, the Dudley Gallery, and other exhibitions. It also states that she was a member of the Pastel Society and painted between 700 and 800 portraits, including two of the Queen of Spain as a child, the daughters of the Duke and Duchess of Connaught at Osborne House in 1891 for presentation to Queen Victoria, and two portraits of Queen Mary in 1903.

She was self-taught and a command to paint twenty-two of Queen Victoria's grandchildren instantly made her artistic reputation. During the years 1893 - 1901 she, exhibited at the Dudley Gallery and the New Gallery, and, was a member of the Society of Women Artists and the Royal Society Portrait Painters. At an exhibition and sale, in aid of three charities for women, held in 1896 at Reuben David Sassoon's house Troubridge contributed a pastel 'of delicate workmanship' called L'Enfant Prodigue. Reporting on an exhibition held in 1903 The Guardian comments:

In the Groves Gallery Mrs. Adrian C. Hope has a number of works in pastel entitled "Friends and Fancies." The friends are pretty children whose prettiness loses nothing in the hands of the artist. The fancies are mostly inspired by nursery rhymes, and they are touched with a neat and whimsical charm that enlivens their somewhat arbitrary drawing.

Her journals (1873-1884) record her designing decorative tiles and Christmas cards from early on. In 1882 the Magazine of Art reports "Christmas card publishers have produced some lovely specimens this year…Laura Troubridge uses a novel medium in her Japanese Designs with gold and colors on gelatine. Her Children in Wonderland is also quite good." In 1891 W.A Mansell & Co. announced that they were reinventing Christmas cards from being 'mere flimsy pasteboard with hackneyed quotations' to 'objects of design, skilled execution and literary style'. The following year The British Trade Journal writes of the success of the new idea and that the "firm has spared no trouble and cost in procuring new designs by well-known artists…we notice a number of charming sketches by Miss Laura Troubridge printed in red and gold and in colours"

=== Illustrator ===
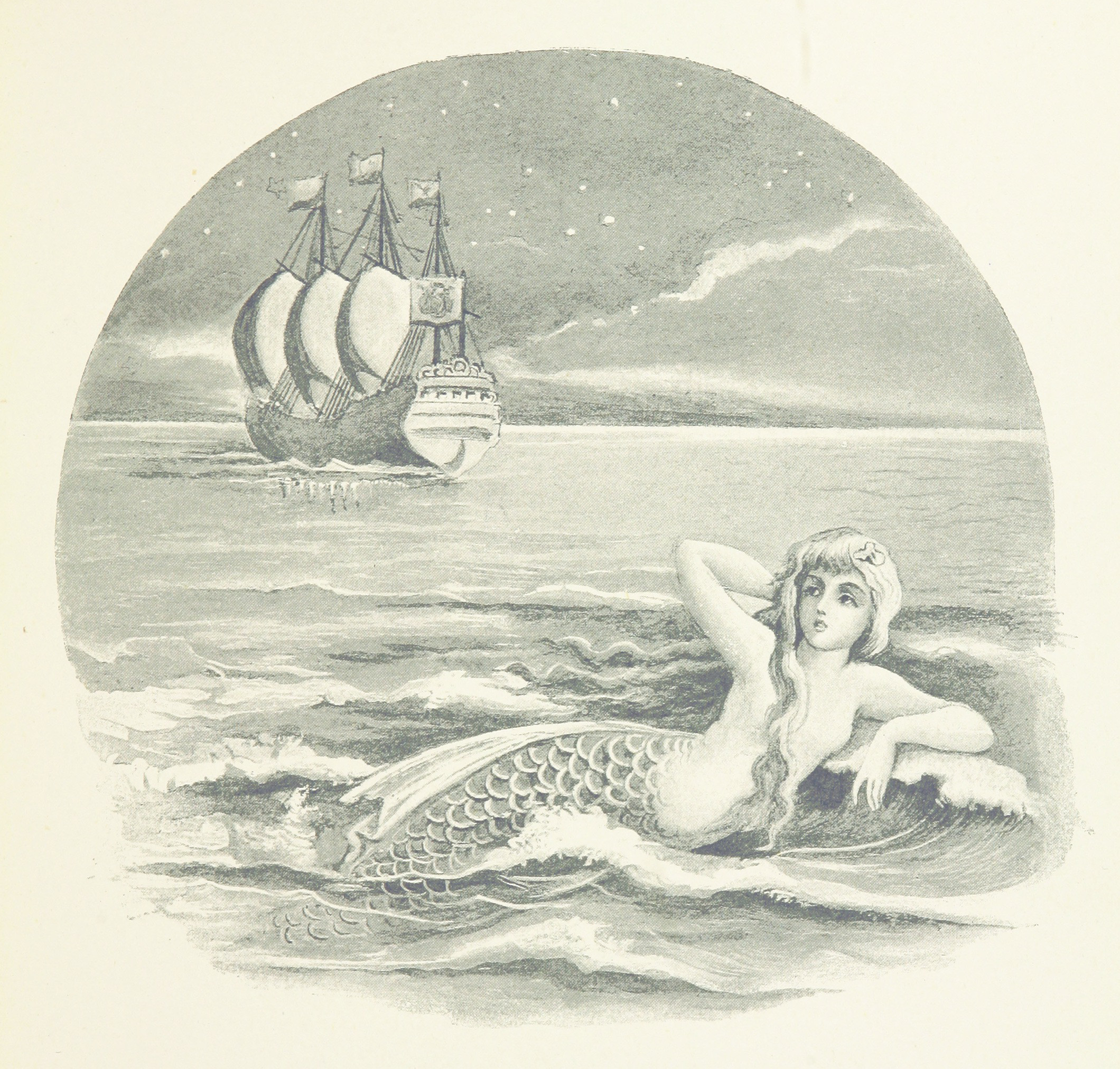
Illustration from an 1888 edition of The Story of the Mermaiden

Oscar Wilde admired the talented 'Troubridge sisters' and in 1886 when Wilde wrote his second fairy story, The Selfish Giant, he sent it to Troubridge in the hope she would provide the illustrations for it.

Lewis Carroll too was impressed with Troubridge's talents. He wrote to Emily Gertrude Thomson:

Do you possess 'Little Thumb' illustrated by Miss Laura Troubridge? If not let me give you a copy. The child-figures are so lovely that I'm sure you would enjoy having it. – Lewis Carroll, 1893

Troubridge's 10 full-page line drawings had a taste of the Pre-Raphaelite. The Anthenaeum described them as having 'a good deal of pretty taste and draughtsmanship' and The Art Journal said Little Thumb was 'elegantly illustrated.'

In 1894 Carroll wrote to his publisher Macmillan extolling the virtues of Troubridge. After mentioning Little Thumb he writes 'Another is The Little Mermaiden: that does not give so good an idea of her skill, as she has drawn the pictures twice over, and the published book is not the best set. The best set appeared in some Magazine (English Illustrated Magazine)" In the same letter Carroll recommended Troubridge's unpublished pictures for The Queen of Hearts, but Macmillan didn't publish them.

Around this time Carroll borrowed a portfolio of work from Troubridge and showed it to his friends. Carroll wrote in his diary, 'Lily and Mabel Widdell, with their brother Chester, came to tea, and saw the drawings' and 'Mr. Toms dined with me and saw' her 'portfolio of drawings.'

Troubridge's illustrations in The Child Elves, a fairy tale founded on facts and on Alice in Wonderland, were described by The Guardian as testifying "to a graceful, dainty, and inventive fancy, although her drawing betrays little firmness of power."

=== Diarist and letter writer ===
==== Life Amongst the Troubridges, 1873-1884 ====
Troubridge started her journal at the age of 15. She had an eye for the absurd which led to a splendid account of her life and her journals give a marvellous insight into Victorian life. She wrote about family life with rich portrayals of her relatives, governesses and tutors. Her journals recorded the beginnings of her career as an artist and she illustrated them with her own drawings. She described picnics and excursions, staying in country houses, visits to London and finally her engagement.

==== Letters of engagement, 1884-1888 ====
The correspondence between Troubridge and Hope during their engagement are full of terms of endearment. Often including tokens of affection like pressed flowers, newspaper clippings, or drawings. But the couple were not always in agreement and they had two significant disagreements. One, when Hope's first cousin is arrested for his actions in support of the unemployed during the "Bloody Sunday" riot in Trafalgar Square in 1887. The second, when Hope, entrusted with some of Troubridge's illustrations to hand to a London publisher, leaves them in a taxi. They were never found. Troubridge collected their 'engagement letters' and arranged them in date order to form a continuous running dialogue.

== Works ==
=== Books ===
- Little Thumb. A Fairy Story, by Hans Andersen (Illustrated by Laura Troubridge), 1883
- The Child Elves. A fairy tale, by M. L. (Illustrated by Laura Troubridge), 1888
- The Old Pincushion; or, Aunt Clotilda's Guests, by Mrs. Molesworth (Illustrated by Mrs. Adrian Hope (Laura Troubridge)), 1890
- The Little Mermaid. The Story of the Mermaiden. Adapted from the German of Hans Andersen, by E. Ashe (Illustrated by Mrs. Adrian C. Hope (née Laura Trowbridge)), 1891
- Eileen's Journey: History in Fairyland by Ernest Arthur Jelf (Illustrated by Mrs. Adrian Hope), 1896
- Daddy's boy, by L. T. Meade (Illustrated by Laura Troubridge), 1898
- The Book of Cottage Hopton, by Laura Troubridge Hope, 1904
- The Sparrow with One White Feather by Lady Ridley (Illustrator Mrs. Adrian Hope), 1905
- The Enchanted Wood: 'Little Comedy In One Act' by Mrs. Adrian Hope (née Laura Troubridge)
- Life Amongst the Troubridges: Journals of a Young Victorian, 1873–84, by Laura Troubridge, 1966
- Letters of Engagement, 1884-1888: The Love Letters of Adrian Hope and Laura Troubridge, 2000
