= Troubridge Island Lighthouse =

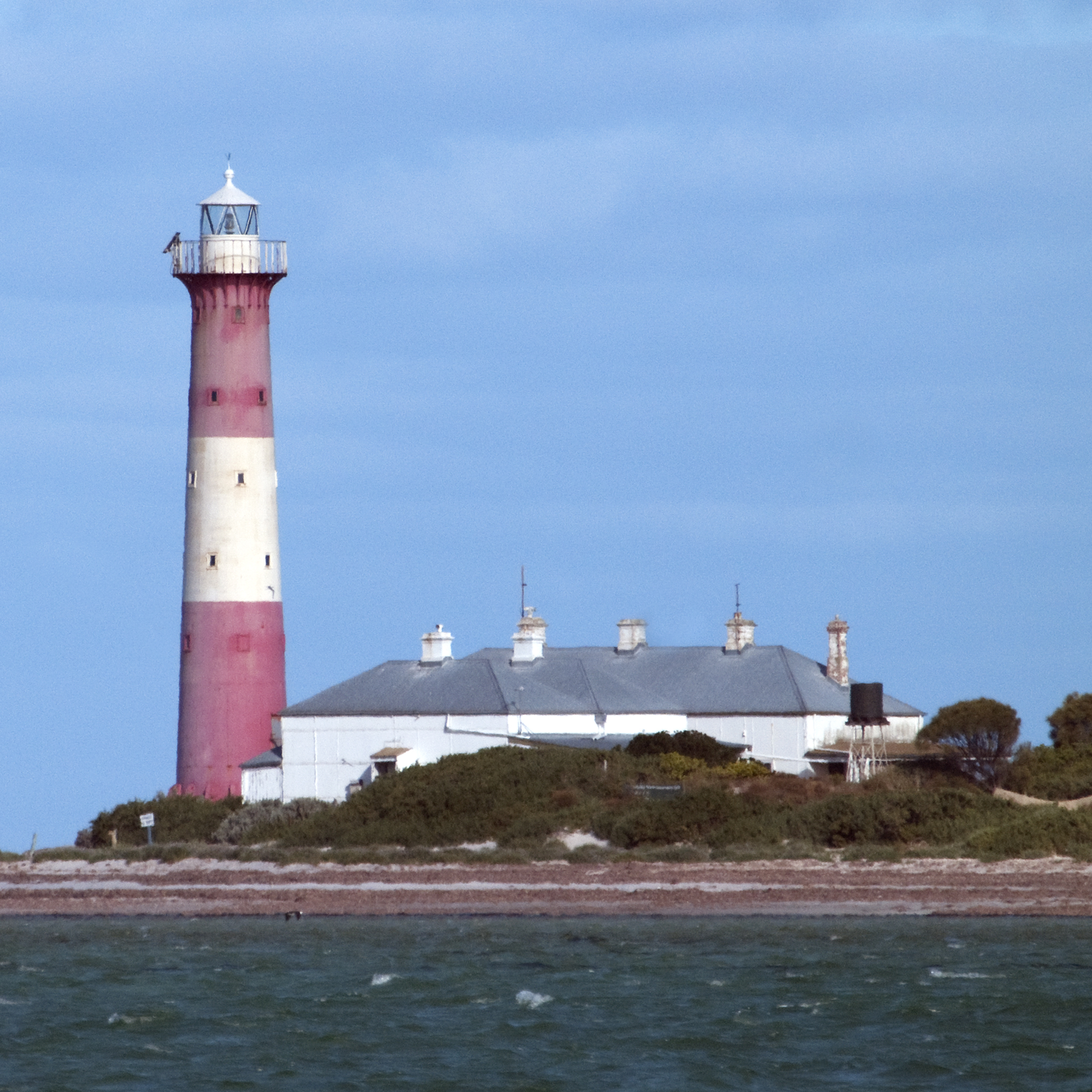
- Location: Troubridge Island; South Australia; Australia
- Coordinates: 35°07′01.2″S 137°49′39.6″E

Tower
- Constructed: 1856
- Construction: cast iron tower
- Automated: 1981
- Height: 24 metres (79 ft)
- Shape: cylindrical tower with balcony and lantern
- Markings: red tower with white horizontal band, white lantern and rail
- Power source: solar power
- Operator: State Government
- Heritage: state heritage place since 23 September 1982

Light
- Deactivated: 2001
- Focal height: 25 metres (82 ft)
- Intensity: white: 1800 cd red: 360 cd
- Range: white: 10 nautical miles (19 km; 12 mi) red: 7 nautical miles (13 km; 8.1 mi)
- Characteristic: Fl WR 10s. (white with red sector)

Troubridge Island Lighthouse is a decommissioned lighthouse in the Australian state of South Australia located on Troubridge Island in Gulf St Vincent about 74 kilometres (46 miles) southwest of the state capital of Adelaide and about 8 kilometres (5.0 mi) southeast by east of Edithburgh on Yorke Peninsula.

== History ==
The lighthouse was commissioned in 1856 as a means to reduce losses caused by the stranding of ships on the Troubridge Shoals.

Czech-born surrealist artist Voitre Marek, who had migrated to Adelaide in 1949, lived with his wife and young children as lighthouse keeper at Troubridge Island from 1957 until 1960, after moving from the Cape du Couedic Lighthouse after that lighthouse was automated and demanned.

The lighthouse was converted to automatic operation in 1981 and decommissioned in 2001. Its role as a navigation aid was taken over progressively from 1980 by the new Troubridge Hill Lighthouse, located on Troubridge Hill, to the west of the Troubridge Shoals.

In 1978, the lighthouse was listed on the now-defunct Register of the National Estate.

The former Troubridge Island lighthouse and its adjacent Troubridge Island Lighthouse Keepers' Cottages which are listed on the South Australian Heritage Register are now part of the tourist attractions offered within the Troubridge Island Conservation Park.

== See also ==
- List of lighthouses in Australia
