= Alston Rivers =

British defunct publishing company

The Logo of Alston Rivers

Alston Rivers Ltd. was a London publishing firm. The firm originally consisted of the Hon L.J. Bathurst and R.B. Byles and had brought out the novels of Whyte Melville and the Gilbert and Sullivan operas. In 1904 it was reconstituted, with Bathurst and Archibald Marshall putting up the money and Byles as business manager and partner. They published a range of works including travel books, poetry and novels. They published from Chatterton House, Brooke Street, Holborn Bars E.C. and in 1905 moved to Fitzalan House, 13 Arundel Street, Strand W.C. They continued publishing books until 1930.

== Book series ==
- Contemporary Poets Series
- Eton series
- Evergreen Novels
- The Great Literature Series
- The Pinafore Library
- The Story of Exploration Series
- Unique series
