= Archibald Marshall =

- Born: Arthur Hammond Marshall; 6 September 1866
- Died: 29 September 1934 (aged 68)
- Occupations: Novelist, journalist

Arthur Hammond Marshall (6 September 1866 – 29 September 1934), better known by his pen name Archibald Marshall, was an English author, publisher and journalist whose novels were particularly popular in the United States. He published over 50 books and was recognised as a realist in his writing style, and was considered by some as a successor to Anthony Trollope. Educated at Cambridge University, he was later (in 1921) made an honorary Doctor of Letters by Yale University. He travelled widely and made numerous notable acquaintances.

== Biography ==
Archibald Marshall's father, Arthur Marshall (1832–1900), was a businessman in London. Archibald was educated at Highgate School. Not wishing to join his father's shipping company, he had first intended to be a clergyman and studied theology at Trinity College, Cambridge, where he befriended Bertram Fletcher Robinson and Vaughan Williams amongst others. He married the widow Nellie Banks in 1902 (née Ellen Pollard), who had three children by her previous marriage to Alfred Banks, and they had one daughter Elizabeth, born in December 1904.

In 1903 he went to live in Beaulieu, Hampshire where he had a house built. He befriended John, Lord Montagu of Beaulieu, who invited him to be editor of The Car, which was first issued in August 1903. He later wrote a Biography of Lord Montagu in collaboration with Lady Laura Troubridge, which was published in 1930.

Marshall's first published novel was Lord Stirling's Son and the second Peter Binney, Undergraduate; His next, The House of Merrilees had been rejected by a variety of publishers, and after rewriting it in 1904 he established the publishing firm Alston Rivers along with two others, to publish it in 1905.

In Cambridge, Marshall had written articles for The Granta under R. C. Lehmann; when Lehmann replaced Sir John Richard Robinson as editor of the Daily News in 1901, Marshall was appointed as his secretary, and later became literary editor. Marshall befriended G. K. Chesterton, and helped him to obtain a position at the Daily News whilst he held this post. In 1906, he was appointed as Assistant Director of the new Daily Mail Literary Supplement, Books, being promoted to Director six months later. Marshall left the Daily Mail in 1911, hoping to make a living from writing novels, and he moved to Switzerland with his family in 1913. In 1916 he was forced to return to journalism as the Paris Correspondent of the Daily News. He was later to write short stories for Punch between 1926 and 1934, many of which were later republished in his books Simple People, Simple Stories and Simple Stories from Punch.

=== Met lots of interesting people ===
- Lord John Montagau
- William Dean Howells
- George Morrow
- Bertram Fletcher Robinson
- R C Lehmann
- Lady Laura Troubridge
- Vaughan Williams
- Wilber Wright
- George Cadbury
- Henry James
- Ford Maddox Ford
- Edmund Clerihew Bentley

== Works ==
- Lord Stirling's Son (1895)
- Peter Binney Undergraduate (1899)
- The House of Merrilees (1905)
- Richard Baldock (1906)
- Exton Manor (1907)
- Many Junes (1908)
- The Squire's Daughter (1909)
- The Eldest Son (1911)
- Sunny Australia (1911)
- The Mystery of Redmarsh Farm (1912)
- The Honour of the Clintons (1913)
- Roding Rectory (1914)
- Rank and Riches (1915)
- Upsidonia (1915)
- Watermeads (1916)
- The Graftons (1918)
- Abington Abbey (1919)
- The Clintons and Others (1919)
- Sir Harry (1919)
- Wooden (1920) Republished as "Young Peggy in Toyland" (1924)
- A Spring Walk in Provence (1920)
- The Hall and the Grange (1921)
- Big Peter (1922)
- Pippin (1923)
- The Clinton Twins and Other Stories (1923)
- Anthony Dare (1923)
- Jimmy the New Boy (1923)
- The Education of Anthony Dare (1924)
- Anthony Dare's Progress (1925)
- The Allbrights (1926)
- Joan and Nancy (1926)
- Simple Stories (1927)
- Young Peggy In Toyland (1928)
- John (1928)
- Simple People (1928)
- Miss Welby at Steen (1929)
- Audacious Ann (1929)
- Simple Stories from Punch (1930)
- Two Families (1931)
- The Appletons of Hern (1931)
- The Lady of the Manor (1932)
- William Speaking (1933)
- Angel Face & Other Stories (1933)
- The Claimants (1933)
- Out and About (1933)
- The Birdikin Family (1932)
- Mrs Jim (1932)
- Nothing Hid (1935)
