= Ronald Weeks, 1st Baron Weeks =

Lieutenant-General The Right Honourable The Lord Weeks KCB CBE DSO MC & Bar TD
- Born: 13 November 1890; Durham, County Durham, England
- Died: 19 August 1960 (aged 69)
- Military career
- Allegiance: United Kingdom
- Branch: British Army
- Rank: Lieutenant-General
- Service number: 51084
- Commands: 5th Battalion, Prince of Wales's Volunteers
- Conflicts: First World War; Second World War
- Awards: Knight Commander of the Order of the Bath; Commander of the Order of the British Empire; Distinguished Service Order; Military Cross & Bar; Territorial Decoration; Mentioned in Despatches (3)

Lieutenant-General Ronald Morce Weeks, 1st Baron Weeks, KCB, CBE, DSO, MC & Bar, TD (13 November 1890 – 19 August 1960) was a British Army general during the Second World War.

== Military career ==
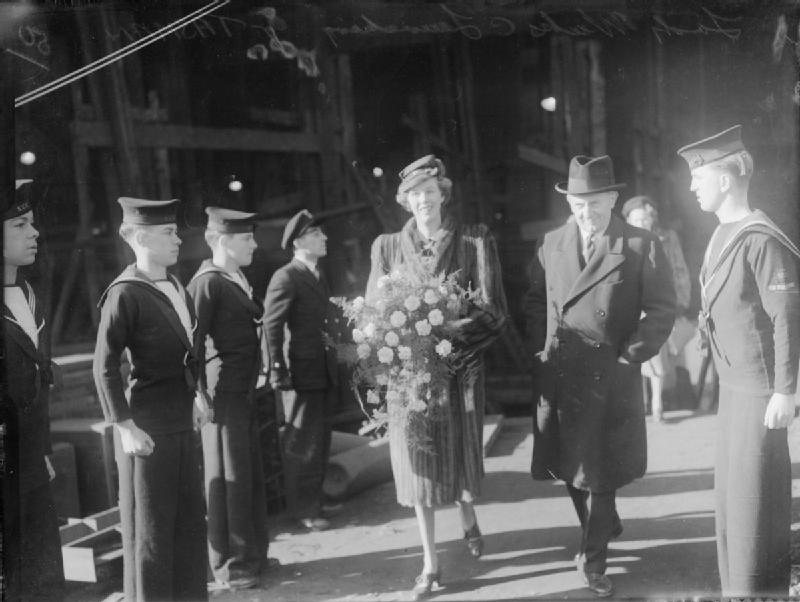
Lady Weeks, wife of Lieutenant General Sir Ronald Weeks, walking with Commander E R Micklem, Managing Director of Vickers Armstrong, at the Vickers Armstrong Yard in Barrow-in-Furness.

Weeks was commissioned into the South Lancashire Regiment of the Territorial Army in 1913. He served in the Rifle Brigade during the First World War, Weeks was awarded the Military Cross (MC) in 1917, and a Bar to the MC in 1918. The citation for his MC reads:

For conspicuous gallantry and devotion to duty during lengthy operations. It was largely due to his courage and able leadership that the counter-attack of two battalions against a hostile position was successful. During a subsequent withdrawal he carried out some very valuable and gallant reconnaissance work.

Weeks was also appointed to the Distinguished Service Order in 1918, and was mentioned in dispatches three times for his service during the First World War. He retired from military service in 1919.

Weeks was re-employed during the Second World War, initially as chief of staff for the Territorial Division and then as a brigadier on the General Staff of Home Forces in 1940. He was promoted to acting major-general on 17 March 1941 and was appointed Director General of Army Equipment in 1941 and Deputy Chief of the Imperial General Staff in 1942. He then became Deputy Military Governor and Chief of Staff of the British Zone for the Allied Control Council in Germany in 1945; in that capacity he was involved in negotiations to avoid the Berlin Blockade. He retired from the British Army later that year. Weeks was appointed a Commander of the Order of the British Empire in 1939, and a Knight Commander of the Order of the Bath in 1943.

== Later life ==
After the war, Weeks became Chairman of Vickers. In 1956 he was raised to the peerage as Baron Weeks, of Ryton in the County Palatine of Durham.

== Marriages and children ==
Weeks married Evelyn Elsie Haynes on 21 April 1922. They were divorced in 1930. On 3 February 1931, he married Cynthia Mary Irvine. With his second wife he had two daughters:

- Hon Pamela Rose Weeks (1931–2019), married Henry Walter Plunkett-Ernle-Erle-Drax (1928–2017) and had five sons including Richard Grosvenor Plunkett-Ernle-Erle-Drax MP
- Hon Venetia Daphne Weeks (1933), married Sir Peter Troubridge, 6th baronet (1927–1988)

Weeks died on 19 August 1960, aged 69, when, in the absence of male heirs, the barony became extinct.

== Bibliography ==
- Smart, Nick (2005). Biographical Dictionary of British Generals of the Second World War. Barnesley: Pen & Sword. ISBN 1844150496.

Military offices
Preceded by None	Deputy Chief of the Imperial General Staff; 1942–1945	Succeeded by Sir Sidney Kirkman
Peerage of the United Kingdom
New creation	Baron Weeks; 1956–1960	Extinct
