= Troubridge Hill Lighthouse =

- Location: Troubridge Hill; Yorke Peninsula; South Australia; Australia
- Coordinates: 35°09′57.9″S 137°38′26.3″E

Tower
- Constructed: 1980
- Construction: brick tower
- Height: 32 metres (105 ft)
- Shape: conical tower with balcony and lantern
- Markings: unpainted red brick tower and white lantern
- Power source: mains electricity
- Operator: Australian Maritime Safety Authority

Light
- First lit: September 1980
- Focal height: 62 metres (203 ft)
- Characteristic: Fl (2) W 15 s.

Troubridge Hill Lighthouse is a lighthouse located on Troubridge Hill on the south coast of Yorke Peninsula in South Australia about 13.5 kilometres (8.4 miles) south west of Edithburgh and about 3.7 kilometres (2.3 miles) west of Troubridge Point.

== History ==
It was built as part of a project to downgrade the lighthouse on Troubridge Island to a relatively low-powered automatic operation (later decommissioned) and built a full-powered light on the nearby Yorke Peninsula coastline. The tower was constructed from unpainted brickwork built of custom-made bricks. The brickwork construction system was selected as it reportedly offered wind and earthquake loading design benefits. As it is intended for automatic operation, the tower has no windows. The innovative use of brickwork in the tower won its procurers an award from the South Australian Clay Brick Association.

== See also ==
- List of lighthouses in Australia
