= Fawcet Wray =

Vice-Admiral Fawcet Wray DSO
- Born: 25 September 1873
- Died: 4 March 1932 (aged 58); Kitzbühel, Austria
- Military career
- Allegiance: United Kingdom
- Branch: Royal Navy
- Rank: Vice-Admiral
- Conflicts: First World War
- Awards: Distinguished Service Order

Vice-Admiral Fawcet Wray DSO (1873 – 1932) was a senior Royal Navy officer.

== Naval career ==
Born on 25 September 1873, Fawcet Wray was educated at Bedford School and at Britannia Royal Naval College.

He was promoted to the rank of lieutenant in 1894 and specialised in gunnery. From April 1900 he served as gunnery lieutenant on the battleship HMS Royal Sovereign, in the Mediterranean Fleet. He was Flag Commander to Lord Charles Beresford between 1905 and 1908, commanded HMS Foresight between 1909 and 1910, HMS Defence between 1913 and 1914.

As flag captain to Rear-Admiral Ernest Troubridge, he played a major role in the outcome of the pursuit of Goeben and Breslau, a German battlecruiser and a light cruiser, respectively. Wray persuaded Troubridge to not engage Goeben, whose 11-inch main guns outranged those of Troubridge's ships. Both Wray and Troubridge were heavily criticised for this decision (the transfer of Goeben and Breslau to the Turks helped influence the previously neutral Ottoman Empire to join the Central powers), and both were brought before a court-martial. Although the verdict was in their favour, their reputations were severely damaged.

He commanded HMS Talbot in 1915 during the Gallipoli Campaign, for which he was commended by King George V and awarded the Distinguished Service Order. He commanded HMS Drake between 1916 and 1917, and HMS Berwick and HMS Caesar in 1918.

Captain Fawcet Wray was promoted to the rank of rear-admiral on 2 May 1922 and to the rank of vice-admiral on 2 July 1927.

He died in Kitzbühel, Austria, on 4 March 1932. The Times reported that he collapsed whilst skiing and died almost instantly.
