= Troubridge Point =

Troubridge Point South Australia
- Coordinates: 35°10′0.408″S 137°40′46.344″E
- LGA(s): Yorke Peninsula Council

Troubridge Point is a headland in the Australian state of South Australia located on the south coast of Yorke Peninsula about 11 kilometres (6.8 miles) south west of Edithburgh. It is the western end of the opening to Gulf St Vincent.

== Description ==
Troubridge Point is about 11 kilometres (6.8 miles) south west of Edithburgh. It is the most easterly point of the Yorke Peninsula coast that directly adjoins Investigator Strait. It is the termination for a pair of coastlines – one extending from Cape Spencer in the west and the other extending from Sultana Point from the north in Gulf St Vincent. It is the western end of the opening to Gulf St Vincent. As of 2014, the point was located within the locality of Honiton.

== Formation, geology & oceanography ==
Troubridge Point was formed when the sea reached its present level 7,500 years ago after sea levels started to rise at the start of the Holocene. The cliff line which includes Troubridge Point consists of a sedimentary rock called Port Willinga Formation. The water adjoining Troubridge Point drops to a depth of 10 metres (33 feet) at the base of its cliff face.

== Economic activity ==
As of 2014, the land adjoining Troubridge Point is used for farming.

== See also ==
- Troubridge Hill
- Troubridge Hill Lighthouse
