= Trubridge =

Trubridge is a surname. Notable people with the surname include:

- David Trubridge, New Zealand furniture designer
- Horace Trubridge (born 1957), British trade union leader and former musician
- William Trubridge (born 1980), New Zealand freediver

== See also ==
- Troubridge (disambiguation)
