= His Grace Gives Notice (1924 film) =

1924 film

- Directed by: W. P. Kellino
- Written by: Laura Troubridge (novel); Lydia Hayward
- Starring: Nora Swinburne; Henry Victor and John Stuart; Mary Brough
- Production company: Stoll Pictures
- Distributed by: Stoll Pictures
- Release date: May 1924
- Running time: 5,900 feet
- Country: United Kingdom
- Languages: Silent; English intertitles

His Grace Gives Notice is a 1924 British silent comedy film directed by W. P. Kellino and starring Nora Swinburne, Henry Victor and John Stuart. It is an adaptation of the 1922 novel His Grace Gives Notice by Laura Troubridge. A sound adaptation was made in 1933.

== Cast ==
- Nora Swinburne – Cynthia Bannock
- Henry Victor – George Berwick
- John Stuart – Joseph Longley
- Eric Bransby Williams – Ted Burlington
- Mary Brough – Mrs. Smith
- Gladys Hamer – Flickers
- Phyllis Lytton – Mrs. Stapleton
- Knighton Small – Butler

== Bibliography ==
- Low, Rachael. History of the British Film, 1918–1929. George Allen & Unwin, 1971.
