= Troubridge Island Conservation Park =

Protected area in South Australia

- IUCN category III (natural monument or feature)
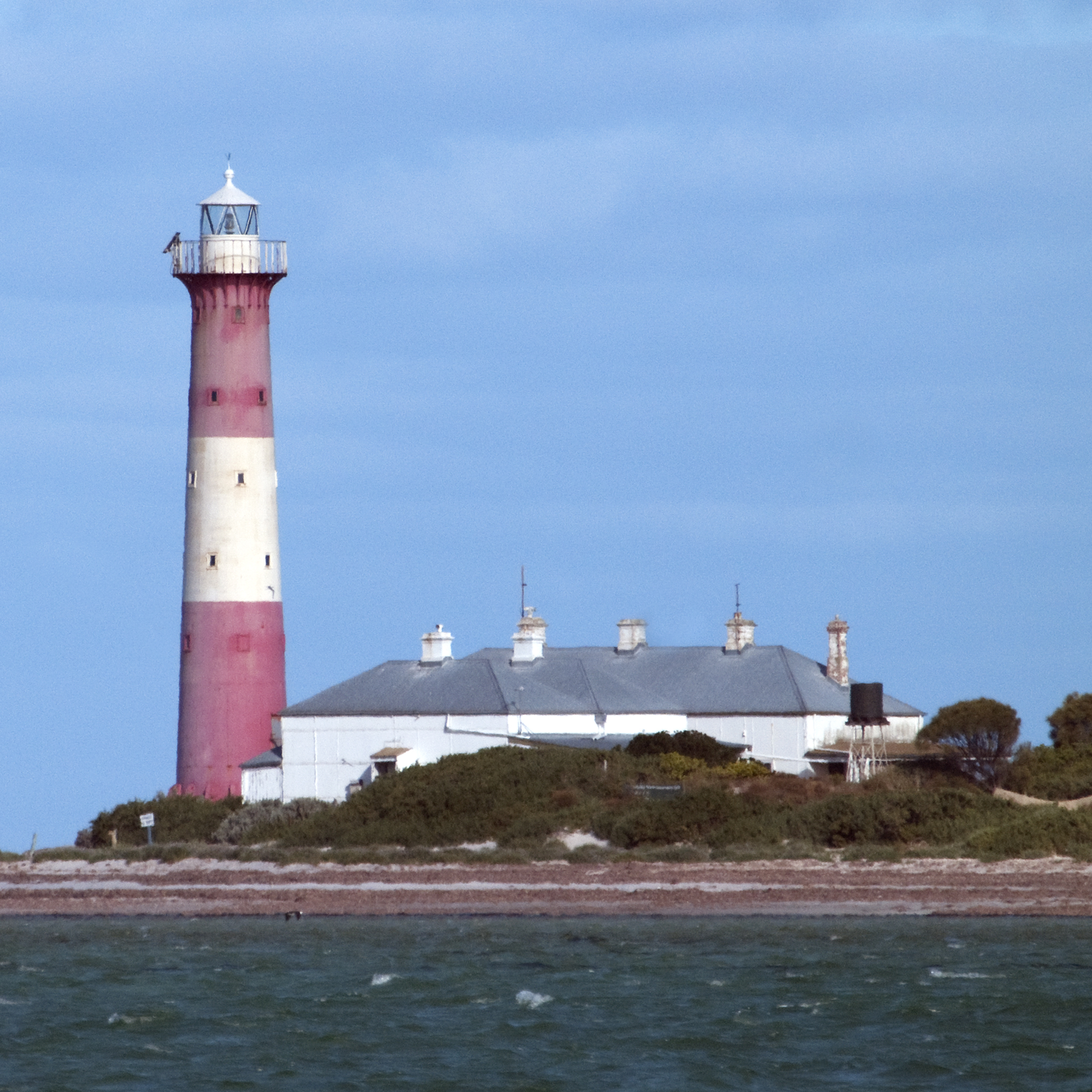
- Troubridge Island Lighthouse

- Location within South Australia
- Location: South Australia
- Nearest city: Edithburgh
- Coordinates: 35°7′4″S 137°49′38″E
- Area: 2.59 km^{2} (1.00 sq mi)
- Established: 16 December 1982
- Visitors: estimated 350-400 (in 2009)
- Governing body: Department for Environment and Water
- Website: Official website

Troubridge Island Conservation Park is a protected area includes all of Troubridge Island and some adjoining waters about 8 kilometres (5.0 miles) East-southeast of Edithburgh in South Australia and about 74 kilometres (46 miles) southwest of Adelaide. The park was proclaimed in 1982 under National Parks and Wildlife Act 1972 ‘to conserve sea-bird rookeries and to preserve heritage values of a lighthouse and associated keepers’ cottages’. In 1986 the park was extended to include an area of intertidal waters around the island. The conservation park is classified as an IUCN Category III protected area.

== Citations and references ==
=== References ===
- Management Plan - Althorpe Islands, Goose Island and Troubridge Island Conservation Parks (PDF). Adelaide: Department of Environment & Heritage (DEH). 2009. ISBN 978-1-921466-76-2.
