= Trowbridge (surname) =

Trowbridge is a surname. Notable people with the surname include:

- Alexander Buel Trowbridge (1929–2006), U.S. Secretary of Commerce under President Lyndon Johnson
- Augustus Trowbridge (1870–1934), American physicist and professor
- Bill Trowbridge (1930–2019), British physicist and engineer
- Bob Trowbridge (1930–1980), American professional baseball player
- Charles Trowbridge (1882–1967), American film actor
- Charles Christopher Trowbridge (1800–1883), American explorer, politician, businessman and ethnographer of Native American cultures
- Charles T. Trowbridge (1835–1907), American politician
- Edmund Trowbridge (1709–1793), judge during the Boston Massacre trial
- Elton Trowbridge (1904–1974), member of the Wyoming House of Representatives
- Glenn E. Trowbridge (born 1943), American politician
- John Trowbridge (physicist) (1843–1923), American physicist
- John Todd Trowbridge (1780–1858), member of the Wisconsin Territorial Legislature
- John Townsend Trowbridge (1827–1916), American author
- Josiah Trowbridge (1785–1862), American politician
- N. C. Trowbridge (1815–1879), American slave trader
- Peter Trowbridge, American landscape architect
- Richard Trowbridge (1920–2003), Royal Navy rear-admiral and Governor of Western Australia
- Rowland E. Trowbridge (1821–1881), American politician
- Samuel Beck Parkman Trowbridge (1862–1925), partner in Trowbridge & Livingston architectural practice
- Stephen V. R. Trowbridge (Michigan Attorney General) (1855–1891), American lawyer and politician
- Stephen V. R. Trowbridge (Michigan legislator) (1794–1859), American politician
- Thomas E. Trowbridge (1930–2009), member of both houses of the Wyoming State Legislature
- William P. Trowbridge (1828–1892), American mechanical engineer, military officer and naturalist
