= His Grace Gives Notice (novel) =

1922 comedy novel

- Author: Lady Troubridge
- Language: English
- Publisher: Methuen
- Publication date: 1922

His Grace Gives Notice is a 1922 comedy novel by Lady Laura Troubridge. It was first published by Methuen in the United Kingdom and Australia, and by Duffield & Co. in the United States. A butler tries to hide the fact that he has recently inherited a title and an estate so that he can continue to romance the daughter of the house where he is in service.

== Adaptations ==
The novel was adapted into films twice. In 1924, a silent version His Grace Gives Notice was directed by W.P. Kellino. In 1933, a sound adaptation His Grace Gives Notice directed by George A. Cooper was released.
