= Troubridge Island =

Island in South Australia

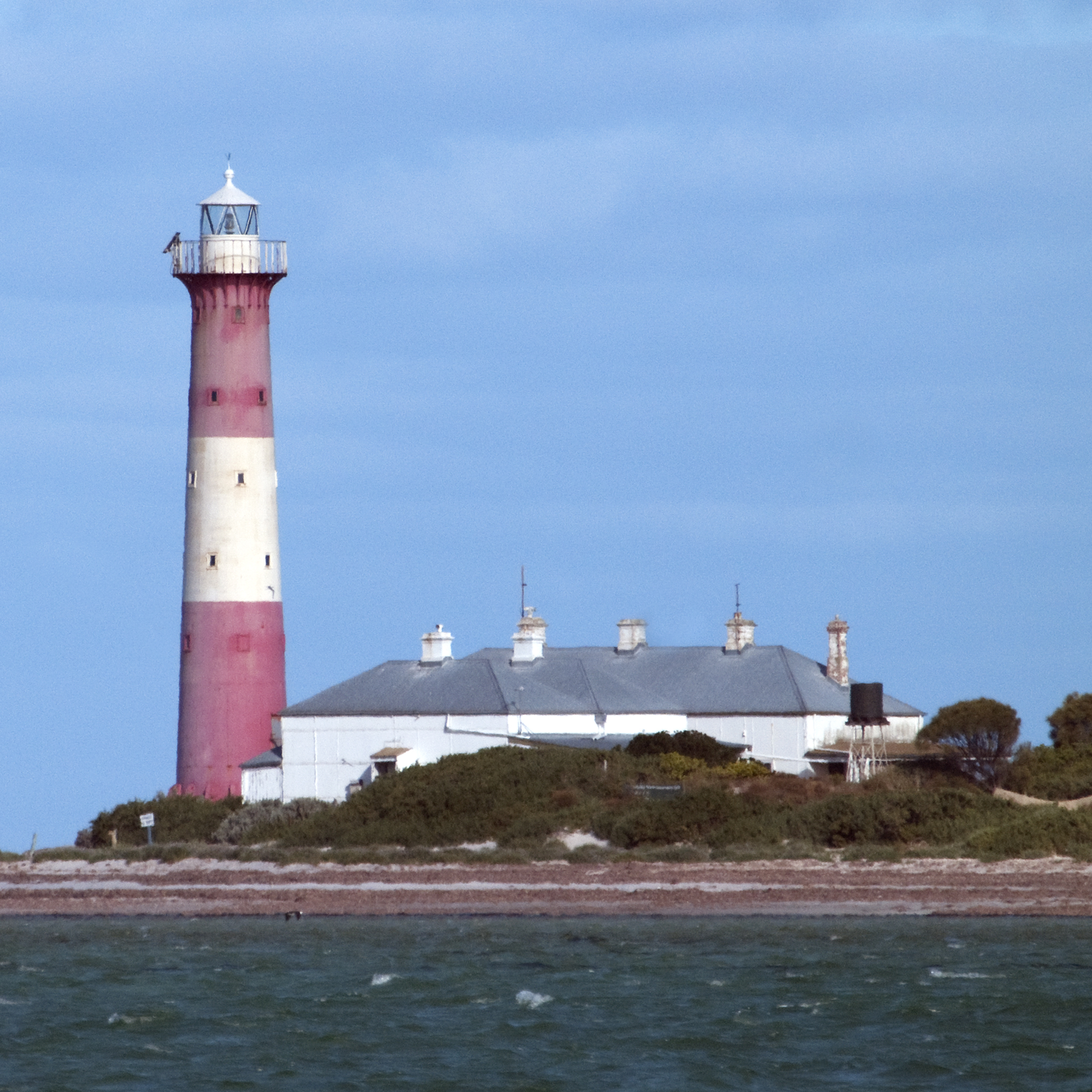
- Troubridge Island Lighthouse

- Location within South Australia

Geography
- Location: Gulf St Vincent
- Coordinates: 35°07′04″S 137°49′38″E
- Area: 2 ha (4.9 acres)
- Highest elevation: 5 m (16 ft)

Administration
- Australia

Troubridge Island is an island located in the south west corner of Gulf St Vincent in South Australia near the eastern edge of the Troubridge Shoals off the east coast of Yorke Peninsula about 8 kilometres (5.0 mi) southeast by east of the town of Edithburgh It is notable for being a site of an operating lighthouse from 1856 until 2002 and as a site for a sea bird rookery. Since 1982, the island has been part of the Troubridge Island Conservation Park.

== History ==
=== Pre-colonial use ===
The Narungga people have a traditional association with Troubridge Island as well as other islands in the area.

=== European discovery and use ===
Matthew Flinders came across the Troubridge Shoals on 1 April 1802. He did not report the existence of the island, although he surveyed the shoal and the Yorke Peninsula.

A lighthouse known as the Troubridge Island Lighthouse was erected on the island as a means to reduce shipping losses caused by the strandings on the Troubridge Shoals. It was first lit in 1856, after three lighthouse-keepers' cottages were built. It was converted to automatic operation in 1981 and its role as a navigation aid was taken over progressively from 1980 by a new lighthouse located on Troubridge Hill on Yorke Peninsula to the west of Troubridge Island. It was decommissioned in 2001.

In 1981, the island was sold to the South Australian Government who proceeded with the establishment of the Troubridge Island Conservation Park. The land associated with the lighthouse being leased by the Australian Maritime Safety Authority (AMSA). In 1993, the lease was transferred to the South Australian Government for the remainder of its term.

== Description ==
Troubridge Island is located approximately 8 kilometres (5.0 mi) southeast by east of the town of Edithburgh near the eastern edge of the Troubridge Shoals. It is a "crest of sand" which is permanently above high tide and which is stabilised by the presence of vegetation. At high water, the Island had an area of 2 hectares (4.9 acres) and a height of 5 metres (16 feet) as of 1996. At low water, its intertidal zone extended for at least one kilometre (0.62 mi) from its high water mark. The island is most accessible at high tide, when there is sufficient water over the intertidal zone to allow a boat reach the permanently dry land. Since 1988, access to the island has been restricted to these with permits provided by the Department of Environment, Water and Natural Resources.

According to the Yorke Peninsula Visitor Information website, "Troubridge Island (approximately 2 ha (4.9 acres) at high tide) is essentially a vegetated shifting sand-spit that rises from the heart of a broad sandbank (Robinson et al., 1996). The island's profile has altered considerably over the years".

== Flora and fauna ==
=== Flora ===
Most of the 31 plant species recorded from the island are introduced. The vegetation consists of low shrubland dominated by nitre bush, grey saltbush and African boxthorn. Other prominent plants present are tree mallow, sea rocket, marram grass and hairy spinifex.

=== Fauna ===
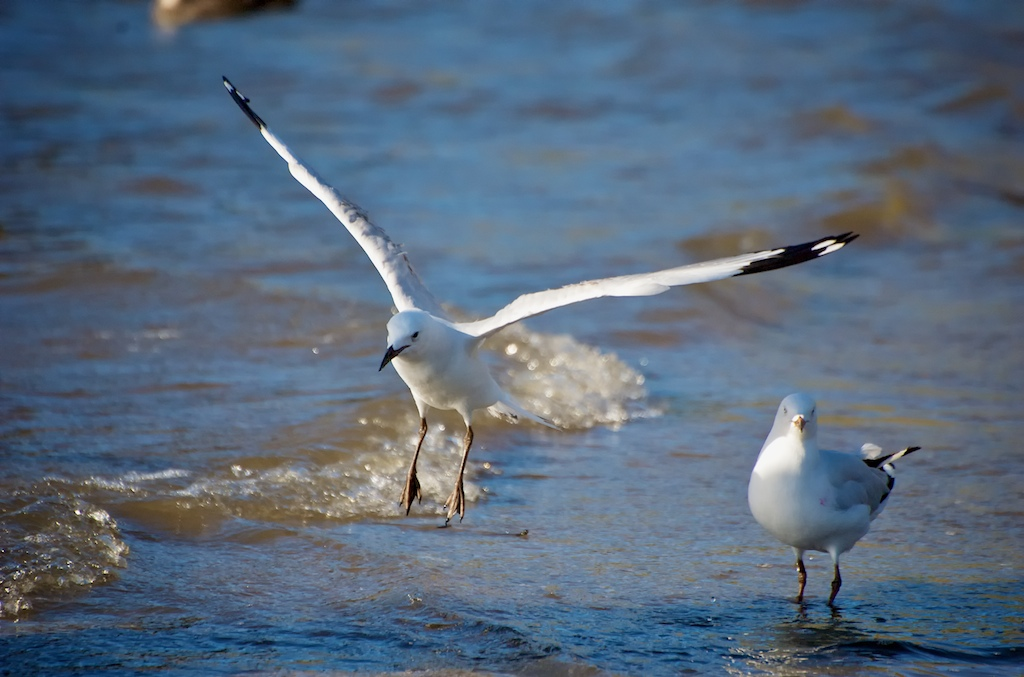
The island is an important breeding site for silver gulls

Fauna on Troubridge Island is represented by both birds and reptiles. As of 2009, almost 60 native bird species have been recorded including 21 species of conservation significance and 22 species listed as migratory. Dominant species include black-faced cormorants, Caspian terns, crested terns and fairy terns, Pacific gulls, little penguins, pied cormorants, and silver gulls.

As of 1996, starlings, an introduced species, was reported as having a population of 10,000 and was "competing with native species for roosting sites and fouling the keepers' cottages."

The following reptile species have been recorded on Troubridge Island: marbled geckos and sleepy lizards.

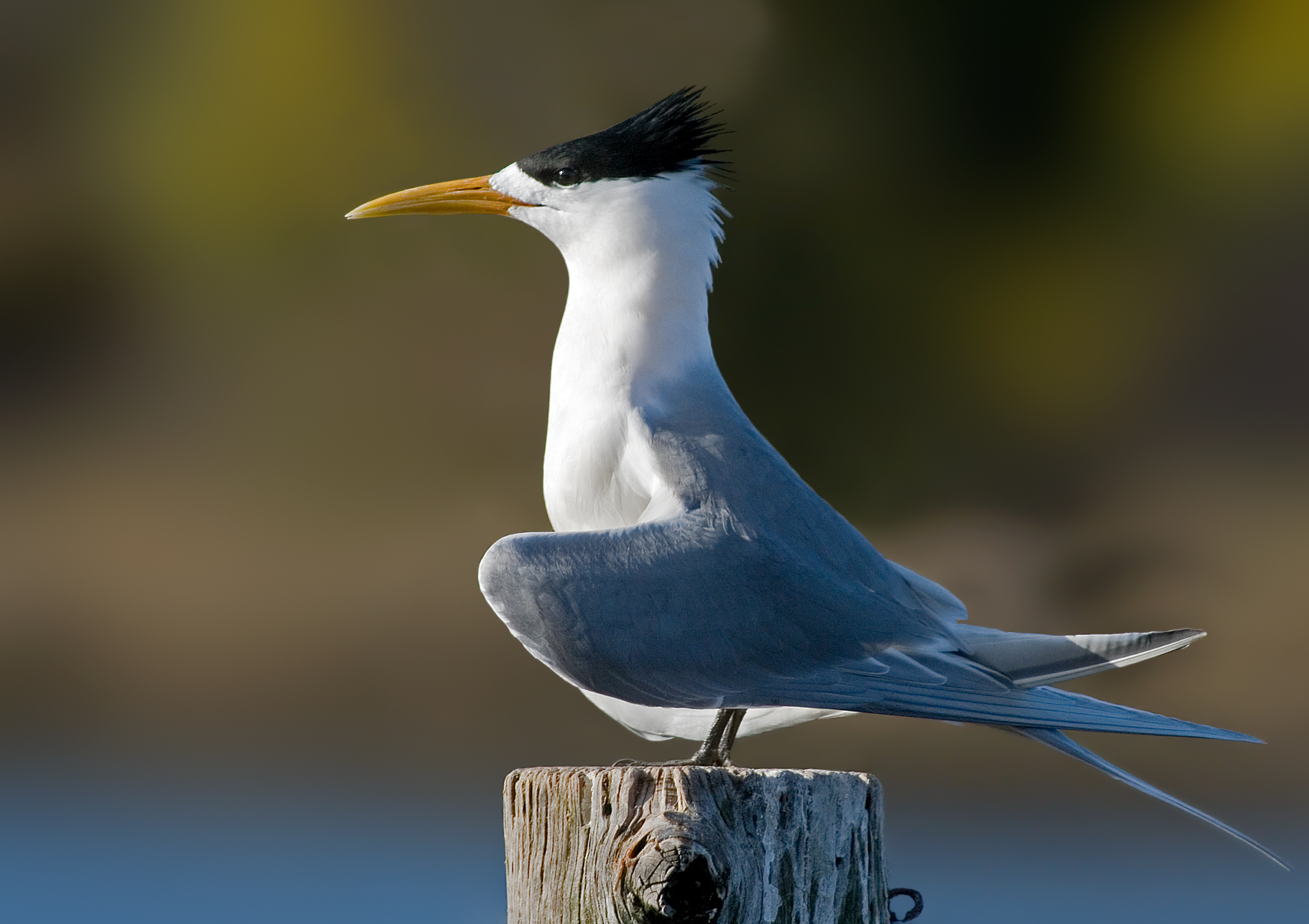
Crested terns breed on the island

In August 2026, mass deaths of crested terns were discovered on three South Australian islands: The Pages and Troubridge Island, totalling around 1,000 dead birds. It was "presumed" that they had died of H5N1 bird flu, in a wave which had reached Australia during June 2026, and was the first such mass death recorded.

==== Little penguin colony ====
Troubridge Island's little penguin colony was approximately 3000-5000 birds during the 1980s. In 2009, its population was estimated to be 3010 breeding adults. There were an estimated 1505 active nests, compared with 1264 in October 2004. A monitoring program was established in 2010. A census conducted in 2013 estimated a total population of 270 breeding adults, showing a severe and unexplained decline. In 2014, the number had increased to 406 penguins. A 2023 study reported that Troubridge Island is one of the largest penguin colonies in South Australia, with around 450 adults recorded in 2016-2018.

There are fears that the population could be further affected by the 2026 outbreak of HfN1 bird flu, as crested terns on the island have already died, and little penguins elsewhere have been affected.

== Troubridge Shoals ==
Troubridge Island is part of Troubridge Shoals which extend across to Yorke Peninsula and constitutes a hazard to shipping. Troubridge Shoals has been the cause of over 33 wrecks and groundings. During the period October 1849 to May 1850, at least seven vessels ran aground. precipitating the erection of a lighthouse in 1855.

When the Parsee was wrecked on the shoals on 13 November 1838 the survivors landed at the adjacent Troubridge Island.

Marion Reef, south of Troubridge Island, was named for the Marion, which ran aground in 1851 as did many others, has been (incorrectly) identified as part of Troubridge Shoals.

== Protected areas status ==
=== Statutory ===
Troubridge Island has been part of the Troubridge Island Conservation Park since 1982. In 1986, the park was extended for a distance about 1 kilometre (0.62 miles) around the island to cover most of the sandbar of which the island is part. Since 2012, the island has been located within the boundaries of the Lower Yorke Peninsula Marine Park.

=== Non-statutory ===
The island (and some of the adjoining sandbar exposed at low tide) has been nominated as an Important Bird Area (IBA) known as the Troubridge Island Important Bird Area by BirdLife International. The basis for the nomination is that the IBA supports over 1% of the world populations of both black-faced cormorants (with up to 4000 individuals) and silver gulls (with up to 10,000 breeding pairs) as well as supporting "significant numbers of the vulnerable fairy tern".

== See also ==
- List of islands of Australia
- List of little penguin colonies
