= Ranald (disambiguation) =

Ranald is a name.

Ranald may also refer to:

- 4248 Ranald, asteroid
- Clan Ranald
- SS Clan Ranald (1900), ship wrecked off Australia
