= His Grace Gives Notice (1933 film) =

1933 film

- Arthur Margetson and Viola Keats the film
- Directed by: George A. Cooper
- Written by: H. Fowler Mear; Lady Trowbridge (novel)
- Produced by: Julius Hagen
- Starring: Arthur Margetson; Viola Keats; Victor Stanley
- Cinematography: Ernest Palmer
- Production company: Real Art Productions
- Distributed by: RKO Radio Pictures
- Release date: 21 July 1933
- Running time: 57 minutes
- Country: United Kingdom
- Language: English

His Grace Gives Notice is a 1933 British comedy film directed by George A. Cooper and starring Arthur Margetson, Viola Keats, Charles Groves and Victor Stanley. It was written by H. Fowler Mear based on the 1922 novel His Grace Gives Notice by Lady Laura Troubridge which had previously been adapted into a 1924 film. It was made as a quota quickie at Twickenham Studios.

== Plot ==
George Barwick is a footman employed by Lord Rannock, who inherits a dukedom. When he takes over the house, he learns that Lord Rannock's daughter Barbara, with whom he is in love, is set to elope with Ted Burlington who, unknown to Barbara, is an ex-Chicago gangster. He assumes the identity of Burlington's butler in order to protect her, and, eventually, wins her for himself.

== Cast ==
- Arthur Margetson as George Berwick
- Viola Keats as Barbara Rannock
- Victor Stanley as James Roper
- Barry Livesey as Ted Burlington
- Ben Welden as Michael Collier
- Edgar Norfolk as Captain Langley
- Dick Francis as Mr. Perks
- Laurence Hanray as Mr. Grayling
- Charles Groves as Henry Evans
- O. B. Clarence as Lord Rannock
- Gertrude Sterroll as Lady Rannock

== Reception ==
Kine Weekly wrote: "An obvious romantic comedy which draws simple, refreshing entertainment from its contrast of life above and below stairs. The evergreen ingredients are mixed with disarming naivete, the characterisation is sound, and the production qualities are sufficiently good to accentuate the point of the play. Useful supporting feature for popular halls."

The Daily Film Renter wrote: "Slender story worked out to accompaniment of below-stairs humour and piquant situations incumbent on main theme. ... Strong performances by Arthur Margetson and Viola Keats. Pleasing production; should provide good entertainment for popular halls."
