= Sir Thomas Troubridge, 3rd Baronet =

British Army officer (1815-1867)

Sir Thomas Troubridge Bt
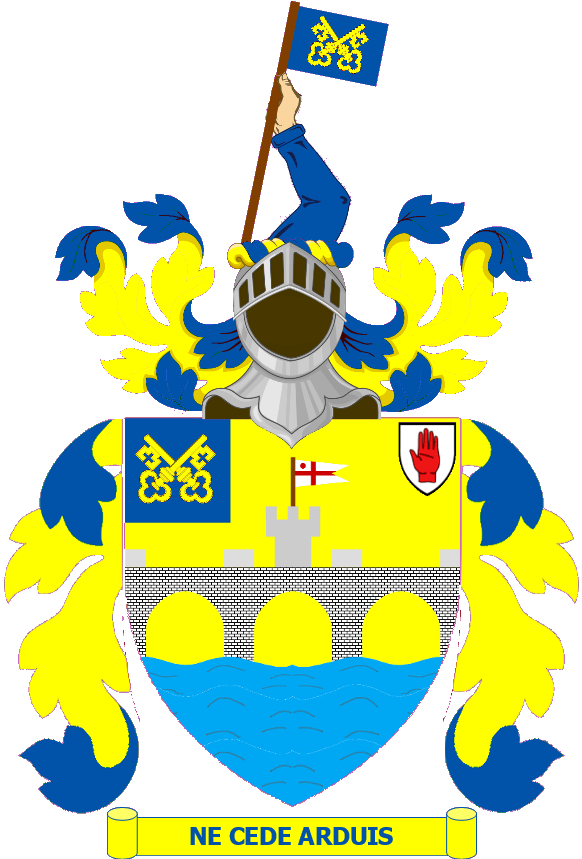
- Born: 25 May 1815
- Died: 2 October 1867 (aged 52); Queen's Gate, Hyde Park, Kensington
- Burial place: Kensal Green Cemetery
- Military career
- Allegiance: United Kingdom
- Branch: British Army
- Rank: Brevet Colonel
- Commands: 7th (Royal Fusiliers) Regiment of Foot
- Conflicts: Crimean War: Battle of Alma; Siege of Sevastopol; Battle of Inkerman
- Awards: Companion of the Order of the Bath; Order of the Medjidie (fourth class); Légion d'honneur
- Spouse: Louisa Jane Gurney (m. 1855; died 1867)
- Children: 7, including Ernest Troubridge
- Parents: Sir Edward Thomas Troubridge (father); Anna Maria Cochrane (mother)
- Relatives: Sir Alexander Cochrane (grandfather)

Lieutenant-Colonel Sir Thomas St Vincent Hope Cochrane Troubridge, 3rd Baronet CB (25 May 1815 – 2 October 1867) was an officer of the British Army who served with distinction during the Crimean War.

Born into a distinguished family with strong military connections, his two grandfathers and his father had been admirals in the Royal Navy. Troubridge entered the army and rose through the ranks, serving at first with the 73rd (Perthshire) Regiment of Foot, and then the 7th (Royal Fusiliers) Regiment of Foot, the latter being a regiment he would later command. He served with his regiment in many stations throughout the Empire, inheriting his father's baronetcy in 1852, and held the rank of major in 1854 when the Crimean War broke out. Troubridge went out with his regiment and saw action in some of the early battles of the war, playing an important role in the Battle of Alma. He was involved in the heavy fighting surrounding the defense of British gun batteries during the Battle of Inkerman, and was badly wounded, losing his right leg and left foot. He refused to leave the battlefield until the attacks had been repulsed, and was commended for his gallantry by his commanding officer.

He returned to Britain and received a number of awards and promotions for his actions in the Crimea, but was unable to return to front-line service due to his injuries. He remained active in the army, in supervising parts of the supply and logistics forces, which he carried out until his death in 1867.

== Family and early life ==
Troubridge was born on 25 May 1815, the eldest son of Admiral Sir Edward Troubridge, and his wife Anna Maria, herself the daughter of another naval officer, Admiral Sir Alexander Cochrane. He attended the Royal Military College, Sandhurst, and entered the army, purchasing his commission as an ensign in the 73rd Foot on 24 January 1834. He was promoted to lieutenant on 30 December 1836 in the Royal Fusiliers (again by purchase), then seeing service around the Empire, at Gibraltar, the West Indies, and Canada. Troubridge obtained further promotions, purchasing the rank of captain on 14 December 1841, and major on 9 August 1850. On the death of his father in 1852 he became the 3rd baronet.

== Crimean War ==
With the outbreak of the Crimean War in 1854, Troubridge was sent with his regiment to the Crimea, and was involved in several of the early battles, seeing action at the Battle of Alma, the operations around the Siege of Sevastopol, and the Battle of Inkerman. At Alma he commanded the Royal Fusiliers' right wing, on the right of the Light Division under Sir George Brown. During the battle Troubridge and the Royal Fusiliers engaged the left wing of the Kazan regiment, and Troubridge led his forces under heavy fire on an assault on the fortified heights.

He remained with the Royal Fusiliers during their operations in support of the allied Siege of Sevastopol and then saw action at Inkerman on 5 November 1854. At Inkerman, Troubridge was the field officer of the day, and was in the reserve of the light division in the Lancaster battery. The position was attacked by Russian troops, and came under heavy fire from Russian guns brought up on the east of the Careenage Ravine to enfilade them. Meeting heavy resistance the Russians concentrated their forces against the battery, and in the desperate fighting that followed Troubridge was wounded by a shot which carried off his right leg and left foot. He refused to be removed from the position, and remained at his post for the next two hours until the attack was beaten off, his limbs propped up on a gun carriage to prevent him from bleeding to death. He was then removed to the hospital after the battle had finished.

In Lord Raglan's despatches of 11 November (gazetted on 2 December), Troubridge was Mentioned as having "behaved with the utmost gallantry and composure", despite his wounds.

== Post-war ==
Troubridge was promoted to brevet lieutenant colonel on 12 December 1854 "for distinguished service in the Field", but his injuries caused him to be invalidated home in May 1855. He was present, in a chair, at the distribution of medals and awards by Queen Victoria on 18 May to those who had distinguished themselves in the Crimea. During this event, he was made an aide-de-camp to the Queen with the rank of brevet colonel. Troubridge was appointed a Companion of the Order of the Bath on 5 July 1855. He also received foreign awards from Britain's allies in the Crimea. The French appointed him Chevalier of the Légion d'honneur, and the Ottomans appointed him to be the Fourth Class of the Order of the Medjidie.

Troubridge received a substantive promotion to lieutenant-colonel (without purchase), and thus became the commanding officer of the Royal Fusiliers on 9 March 1855, but his disability prevented him from serving with the regiment. He was placed on half pay with the 22nd Regiment of Foot on 14 September, but accepted the appointment of director-general of army clothing in 1855. The post was abolished on 2 February 1857, but Troubridge immediately took the successor position as deputy adjutant-general (clothing department). During his time in this role, he designed a new valise to address what he saw as the defects in the standard army issue one. His design was approved by the leading medical officers and was so successful that it became the foundation of future forms of equipment.

== Family and death ==
Troubridge married Louisa Jane Gurney, daughter of Daniel Gurney and a granddaughter of James Hay, 15th Earl of Erroll on 1 November 1855. The couple had three sons and four daughters. Among them their third son, Ernest Troubridge, became a distinguished naval officer, achieving the rank of admiral. Louisa Troubridge died on 29 August 1867, with Sir Thomas dying five weeks later on 2 October 1867, at his home at 8 Queen's Gate, Hyde Park, Kensington. He was 52. A private funeral ceremony was held, and Sir Thomas was buried in Kensal Green Cemetery. His eldest son, Thomas Herbert Cochrane Troubridge, born in 1860, succeeded to the baronetcy. He married his cousin Laura Gurney, daughter of Charles Henry Gurney (son of Daniel Gurney).

== Arms ==
Coat of arms of Sir Thomas Troubridge, 3rd Baronet

Crest
A dexter arm embowed habited Azure holding a flagstaff thereon a flag azure charged with two keys in saltire Or.
Escutcheon
Or on a bridge embattled of three arches through which water is flowing towards the base Proper a tower of the second thereon hoisted a broad pennant flying towards the sinister on a canton Azure two keys in saltire the wards upwards Or.
Motto
Ne Cede Arduis (Latin roughly for, "Yield not to hardships"; cf. Ne cede malis)

== Notes ==
Baronetage of Great Britain
| Preceded by Edward Troubridge | Baronet (of Plymouth); 1852 – 1867 | Succeeded by Thomas Troubridge |
