= Troubridge baronets =

Title in the Baronetage of Great Britain

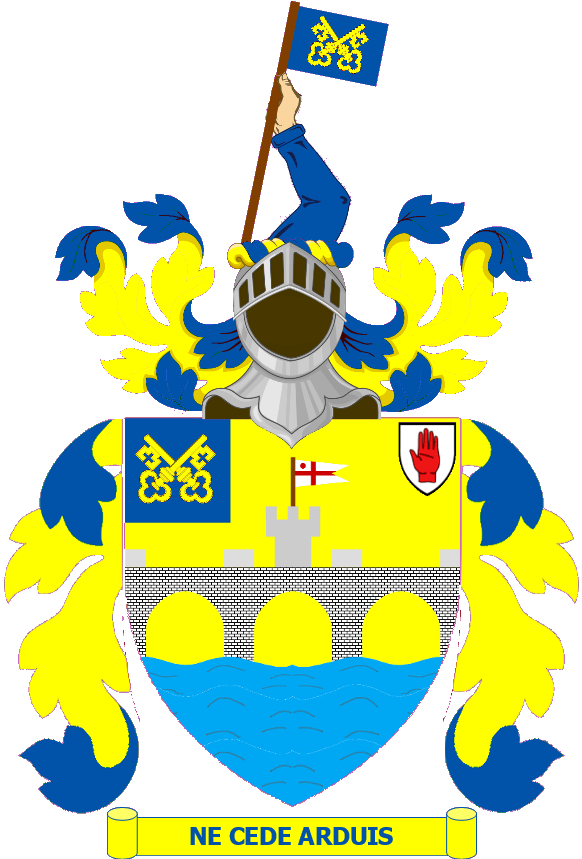
- Coat of arms of the Troubridge baronets of Plymouth
- Creation date: 1799
- Status: extant
- Motto: Ne Cede Arduis (Do not yield to hardships)
- Arms: Or on a bridge embattled of three arches through which water is flowing towards the base Proper a tower of the second thereon hoisted a broad pennant flying towards the sinister on a canton Azure two keys in saltire the wards upwards Or.
- Crest: A dexter arm embowed habited Azure holding a flagstaff thereon a flag azure charged with two keys in saltire Or

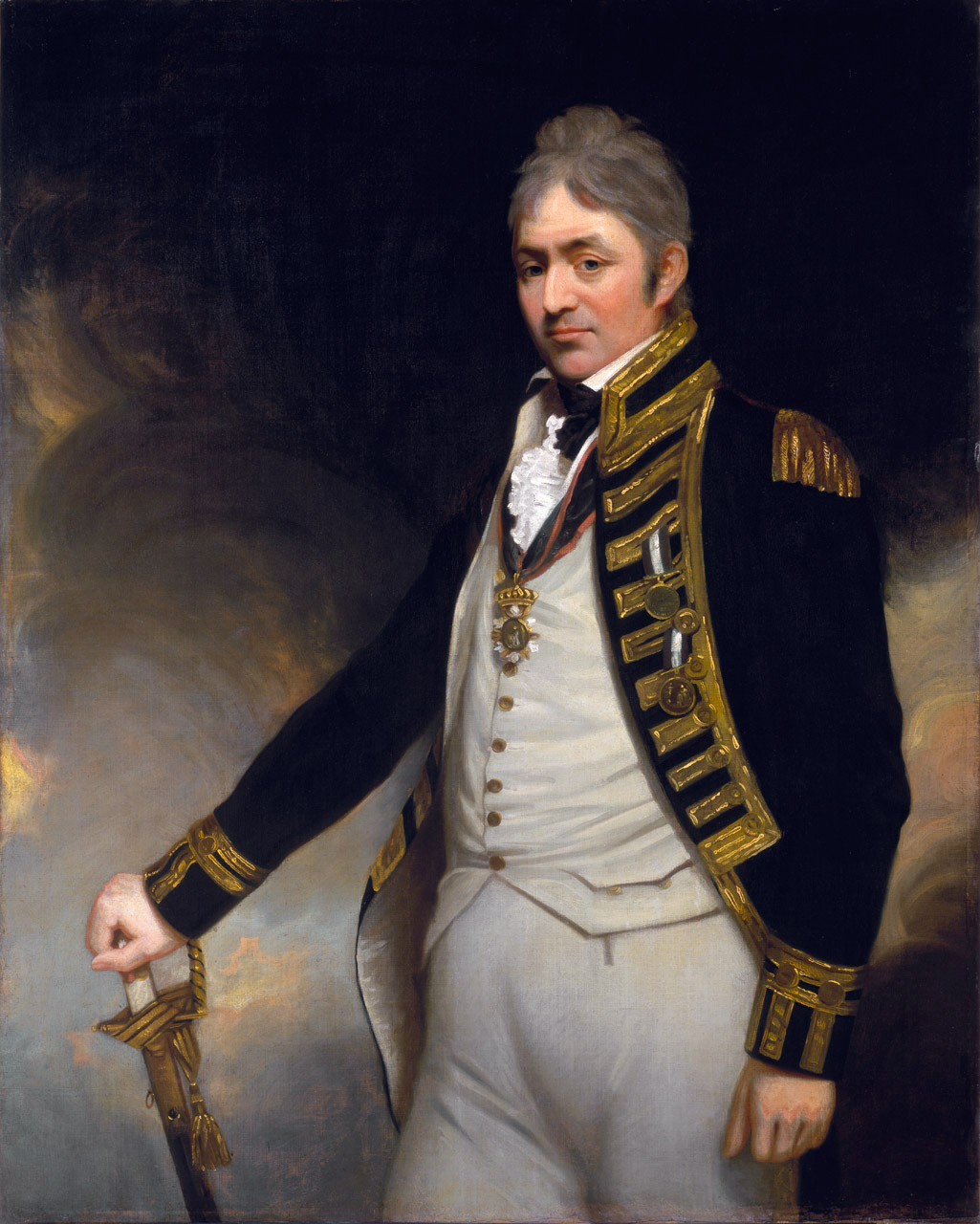
Sir Thomas Troubridge, 1st Baronet

The Troubridge baronetcy, of Plymouth, is a title in the Baronetage of Great Britain. It was created on 30 November 1799 for Captain Thomas Troubridge, an officer of the Royal Navy. In 1797 he led the line at the Battle of Cape St. Vincent. He was Member of Parliament for Great Yarmouth from 1802 to 1806, and became a rear-admiral in 1804.

The 2nd Baronet was also a Royal Navy admiral and sat as Member of Parliament for Sandwich from 1831 to 1847. The 3rd Baronet fought with the 7th Royal Fusiliers in the Crimean War, where he lost his right leg and left foot at the Battle of Inkerman.

The family surname is pronounced "Troobridge".

== Troubridge baronets, of Plymouth (1799) ==
- Sir Thomas Troubridge, 1st Baronet (1758–1807)
- Sir Edward Thomas Troubridge, 2nd Baronet (1787–1852)
- Sir Thomas St Vincent Hope Cochrane Troubridge, 3rd Baronet (1815–1862)
- Sir Thomas Herbert Cochrane Troubridge, 4th Baronet (13 September 1860 – 5 December 1938). Troubridge married Laura Gurney in 1893, and had one son, the 5th Baronet, and two daughters.
- Sir (Thomas) St Vincent Wallace Troubridge, 5th Baronet (15 November 1895 – 16 December 1963). Troubridge married Pamela Clough in 1939, but had no issue.
- Sir Peter Troubridge, 6th Baronet (6 June 1927 – 27 September 1988). Troubridge was the eldest son of Admiral Sir Thomas Hope Troubridge (1895–1949), and succeeded his cousin in the baronetcy in 1963. He married the Hon. Venetia Daphne Weeks, daughter of Ronald Weeks, 1st Baron Weeks, in 1954, and had issue one son, the seventh Baronet, and two daughters.
- Sir Thomas Troubridge, 7th Baronet (born 1955), educated at Eton College and Durham University (University College), former Partner at PriceWaterhouseCoopers and now serves on the board of St Mark's Hospital. Troubridge has been married since 1984 to the Hon. Rosemary Douglas-Pennant (born 1957), younger daughter of Malcolm Douglas-Pennant, 6th Baron Penrhyn, and has issue.

The heir to the baronetcy is the current holder's elder son Edward Peter Troubridge (born 1989).

== Extended family ==
- Edward Norwich Troubridge (died 1850), second son of the 2nd baronet, was a captain in the Royal Navy.
- Laura Gurney, was the wife of the 4th Baronet, and author of The Book of Etiquette (1926).
- Admiral Sir Ernest Troubridge (1862–1926), was the third son of the 3rd Baronet and grandfather of the 6th. He married secondly Una Vincenzo.
- Thomas Troubridge, a banker who was the first husband of Princess Michael of Kent, was a younger brother of the 6th Baronet.

== Footnotes ==
Baronetage of Great Britain
Preceded by Fletcher baronets	Troubridge baronets of Plymouth; 30 November 1799	Succeeded by Glyn baronets
