= Thomas Hope Troubridge =

Royal Navy admiral (1895–1949)

Vice-Admiral Sir Thomas Hope Troubridge KCB DSO*
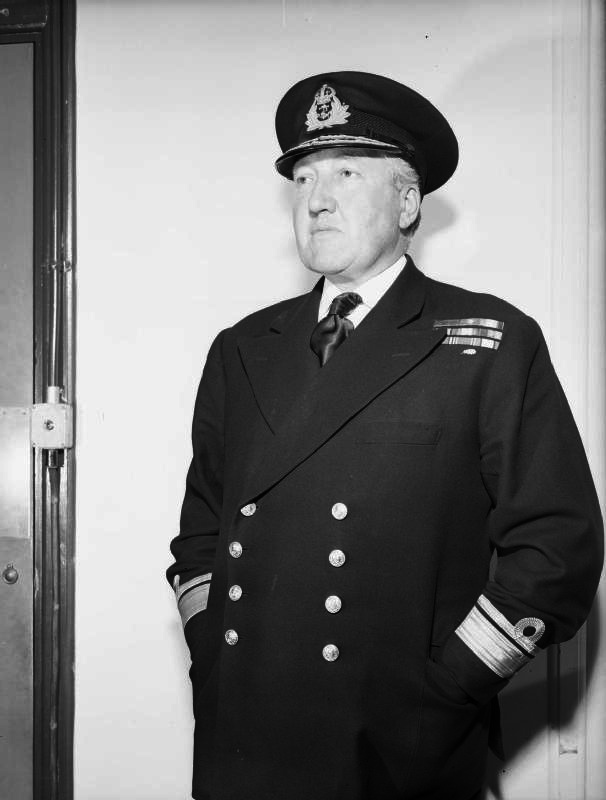
- Rear Admiral Thomas Troubridge in 1945
- Born: 1 February 1895; Southsea, Hampshire, England
- Died: 29 September 1949 (aged 54); Hawkley, Hampshire, England
- Relatives: Admiral Sir Ernest Troubridge (father)
- Military career
- Allegiance: United Kingdom
- Branch: Royal Navy
- Service years: 1908–1949
- Rank: Vice-Admiral
- Commands: Flag Officer, Air (Home) (1946–47); Fifth Sea Lord (1945–46); Task Force 88 (1944); HMS Indomitable (1942); HMS Nelson (1941–42); HMS Furious (1940); HMS Windsor (1933–34); HMS Voyager (1930–31)
- Conflicts: First World War; Second World War
- Awards: Knight Commander of the Order of the Bath; Distinguished Service Order & Bar; Mentioned in dispatches (4); Navy Distinguished Service Medal (United States); Legion of Honour (France); Croix de guerre (France)

Vice-Admiral Sir Thomas Hope Troubridge, KCB, DSO & Bar (1 February 1895 – 29 September 1949) was a Royal Navy officer who served as Fifth Sea Lord from 1945 to 1946.

== Military career ==
The son of Admiral Sir Ernest Troubridge and Edith Mary (née Duffus), Troubridge was born in Southsea, Hampshire, on 1 February 1895. He joined the Royal Navy in 1908, and served in the First World War. In 1936 he became naval attaché in Berlin. He also served in the Second World War, initially as commanding officer of the aircraft carrier HMS Furious carrying much needed sugar back to Britain in July 1940 and then making a number of air strikes on shipping in Norwegian waters and on the seaplane base at Tromsø through October 1940.

Troubridge was given command of the battleship HMS Nelson in June 1941 and then the aircraft carrier HMS Indomitable in January 1942. In 1943, he was appointed Rear Admiral Combined Operations and flag officer commanding overseas assault forces, and in June 1944 he led the invasion and capture of Elba.

After the war Troubridge was appointed Fifth Sea Lord and then, from 1946, Flag Officer, Air (Home). His last appointment was as Flag Officer, Air and Second-in-Command, Mediterranean Fleet in 1948.

== Family ==
Troubridge married Lily Emily Kleinwort in August 1925. They had four children: Their eldest son, Peter, became 6th Troubridge baronet on death of his cousin in 1963. Their fourth child, Thomas, married Baroness Marie-Christine Anna Agnes Hedwig Ida von Reibnitz (later Princess Michael of Kent) in 1971: the marriage was annulled in 1978.

Military offices
Preceded by Sir Denis Boyd	Fifth Sea Lord; 1945–1946	Succeeded by Sir Philip Vian
