= Ernest Troubridge =

Royal Navy Admiral (1862–1926)

Admiral Sir Ernest Troubridge KCMG CB MVO
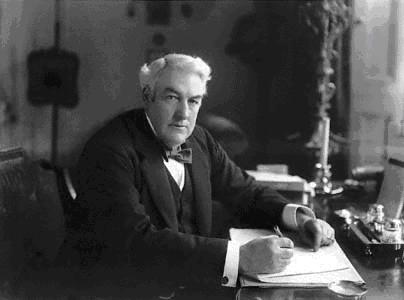
- Born: 15 July 1862; Hampstead, Middlesex, England
- Died: 28 January 1926 (aged 63); Biarritz, France
- Military career
- Allegiance: United Kingdom
- Branch: Royal Navy
- Service years: 1875–1924
- Rank: Admiral
- Commands: HMS Queen; Royal Naval Barracks, Chatham; 1st Cruiser Squadron; British Naval Mission, Serbia
- Conflicts: Russo-Japanese War; First World War: Pursuit of Goeben and Breslau; Serbian Campaign; Macedonian front
- Awards: Knight Commander of the Order of St Michael and St George; Companion of the Order of the Bath; Member of the Royal Victorian Order; Order of the Rising Sun (Japan); Royal Humane Society silver medal
- Education: Wellington College
- Spouse(s): Edith Mary Duffus (m. 1891; died 1900) Una Vincenzo, Lady Troubridge (m. 1908; sep. 1919)
- Parents: Sir Thomas Troubridge, 3rd Baronet (father); Louisa Jane Gurney (mother)
- Relatives: Thomas Hope Troubridge (son); Sir Edward Troubridge, 2nd Baronet (grandfather); Sir Thomas Troubridge, 1st Baronet (great-grandfather)

Admiral Sir Ernest Charles Thomas Troubridge, KCMG, CB, MVO (15 July 1862 – 28 January 1926) was an officer of the Royal Navy who served during the First World War.

Troubridge was born into a family with substantial military connections, with several of his forebears being distinguished naval officers. He too embarked on a career in the navy, rising through the ranks during the late Victorian period, and commanding ships in the Mediterranean. He served as a naval attaché to several powers, including the Empire of Japan during the Russo-Japanese War. He spent some time immediately before the outbreak of the First World War as a staff officer and assisted in the drawing up of strategic plans to be adopted in the event of war, though these were later rejected. He returned to seagoing service just prior to the outbreak of war, and commanded a cruiser squadron in the Mediterranean with the rank of rear-admiral. Here his promising career was blighted by the events surrounding the pursuit of two German warships, SMS Goeben and SMS Breslau. Despite being outclassed by the German warships, Troubridge intended to engage them, but was convinced otherwise by his flag captain and allowed them to escape to Constantinople. He and his commanding officer were heavily criticised for their failure to intercept the German ships, particularly when it subsequently appeared that they became influential in the Turkish decision to enter the war. Troubridge was court-martialled, and although he was acquitted, his reputation was damaged.

Troubridge never had another seagoing command, but did command naval detachments and flotillas on the Danube during the Balkan campaigns, winning the respect of Serbian Crown Prince Alexander. After the war he served on the Danube Commission and was promoted to admiral, but remained out of favour with the Admiralty. He spent several years as president of the commission, retiring in 1924 and dying in 1926. He married twice; his second wife, the sculptor Margot Elena Gertrude Taylor, left him to begin a relationship with the writer Marguerite Radclyffe-Hall.

== Family and early life ==
Ernest Troubridge was born in Hampstead, London, on 15 July 1862, the third son of Sir Thomas Troubridge, 3rd Baronet, and his wife Louisa Jane (daughter of Daniel Gurney and a niece of the Quaker and prison reformer Elizabeth Fry). Thomas Troubridge had served in the army during the Crimean War, and had lost his right leg and left foot at the Battle of Inkerman.

The family had a particularly strong naval tradition. Ernest's great-grandfather, Sir Thomas Troubridge, 1st Baronet, had fought alongside Nelson at Cape St Vincent, while his grandfather, Sir Edward Troubridge, 2nd Baronet, had also been an admiral. Ernest was also more distantly related to the distinguished admirals Alexander Cochrane and Thomas Cochrane, Lord Cochrane. Ernest Troubridge briefly attended Wellington College before joining the Royal Navy in 1875. He trained aboard the Britannia at Dartmouth as a naval cadet, and by 1884 had been promoted to lieutenant. During his service with the fleet he was awarded the silver medal of the Royal Humane Society, when in 1888 he saved the life of a young seaman who had fallen overboard in the night while their ship was in Suda Bay, Crete.

== Rise through the ranks ==
Troubridge was promoted to the rank of commander in 1895, serving with the Mediterranean Fleet aboard the flagship of the fleet's second-in-command, HMS Revenge, initially Rear-Admiral Robert Harris, and later Rear-Admiral Gerard Noel. He was promoted to captain on 17 July 1901 and went on to serve as a naval attaché to several powers, based at first in Vienna and from 1902 in Madrid. He became a naval attaché in Tokyo later in 1902, and served as such until 1904. With the outbreak of the Russo-Japanese War, he went to sea with the Japanese warships and was present at the Battle of Chemulpo Bay and the subsequent operations off Port Arthur. After the conclusion of the war, Troubridge was awarded the Order of the Rising Sun by the Japanese, while the British government appointed him a Companion of the Order of St Michael and St George and a Member of the Royal Victorian Order.

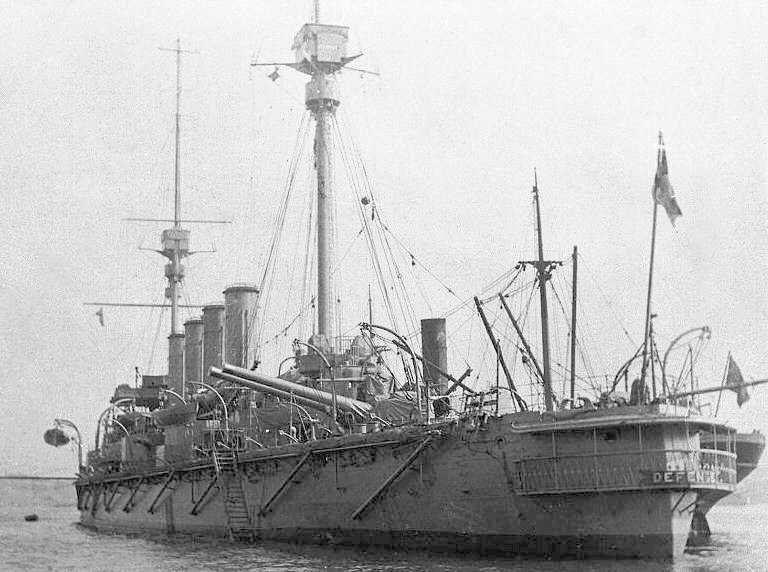
HMS Defence, Troubridge's flagship, in the Mediterranean.

He took command of the battleship HMS Queen, serving as flag captain to the commander of the Mediterranean Fleet, Admiral Charles Carter Drury. After the expiration of this posting, Troubridge spent the years between 1908 and 1910 as commodore, commanding the royal naval barracks at Chatham, and in 1910 became Private Naval Secretary to the First Lord of the Admiralty. Until 1911 this was Reginald McKenna, who was succeeded that year by Winston Churchill. Troubridge was promoted to flag rank in March 1911 with his promotion to rear-admiral, and in 1912 he became chief of the War Staff. During his time on the War Staff, he was involved in the drawing up of plans for naval strategy in the event of war. The plans, which involved the establishment of a massive cordon of warships in British waters, provoked criticism from a number of naval officers and were eventually shown to be unsound in a series of naval exercises and manoeuvres in the summer of 1912. Churchill arranged for Troubridge to leave office at the end of the year, replacing him with Vice-Admiral Sir Henry Jackson. Troubridge returned to active service at sea in January 1913 with his appointment to command the Mediterranean Fleet's cruiser squadron, consisting of HMS Defence, HMS Black Prince, HMS Duke of Edinburgh and HMS Warrior, under the fleet's commander-in-chief, Admiral Archibald Berkeley Milne. During this period, Troubridge flew his flag aboard Defence.

== First World War ==
=== Pursuit of Goeben and Breslau ===
On the entry of the British into the First World War in early August 1914, Germany had two ships in the Mediterranean, forming their Mittelmeerdivision, the battlecruiser SMS Goeben and the light cruiser SMS Breslau. The German ships, under Rear-Admiral Wilhelm Souchon, had been shadowed by a British battlecruiser force, while Milne deployed his fleet to bottle up the German ships. After carrying out a shore bombardment, the Germans were observed to coal at Messina, causing Milne to send most of his force to wait west of Sicily, to prevent Souchon from interfering with French troop convoys. Troubridge and his force of four cruisers were sent to cruise west of Cephalonia in case Souchon should try to enter the Adriatic and join the Austro-Hungarian fleet. The Germans sailed from Messina on 6 August and were observed to be making for the Adriatic. They were shadowed by the light cruiser HMS Gloucester, which reported that the Germans did not intend to enter the Adriatic, but were in fact heading east towards Cape Matapan. Gloucester carried out an attack on the German ships, hoping to slow them down sufficiently for Troubridge's cruisers to bring them to action. However, Troubridge had received orders from Milne in late January that, on the instructions of the First Lord of the Admiralty, Winston Churchill, the British force in the Mediterranean was not to engage superior forces. Churchill had intended this to mean the Austro-Hungarian and Italian fleets, but Troubridge took it to include the Germans. The orders transmitted to Milne stated that his primary objective was to support the transport of French troops, with the engagement of individual German ships a secondary objective. A superior force should only be engaged in combination with the French.

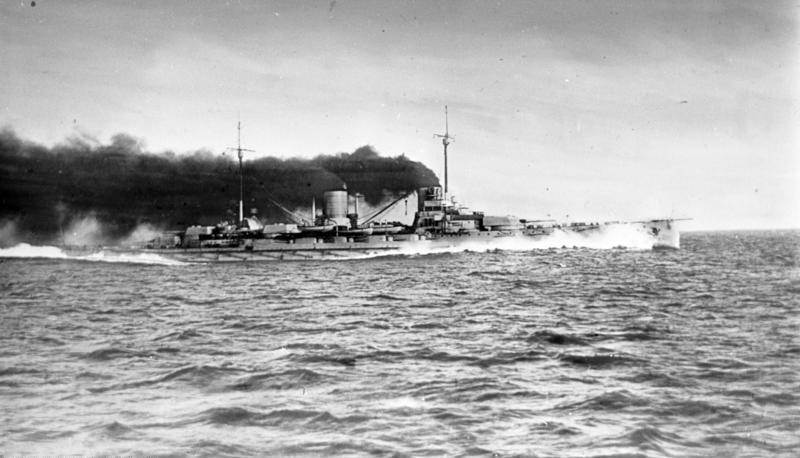
The battlecruiser SMS Goeben

From his experiences in the Russo-Japanese War, Troubridge was aware that modern naval ordnance could devastate his squadron and that the Goeben's 11-inch guns considerably outranged his own, which consisted of 9.2-inch and 7.5-inch guns. A night attack on the German force using the cruiser HMS Dublin failed when the British ship was unable to make contact, so Troubridge attempted to catch the Germans in narrow waters to reduce the range. Troubridge was still unaware of German intentions, and feared they might double back to the north-east and effect a junction with the Austro-Hungarian fleet. Troubridge resolved to intercept the German squadron and headed southwards to do so, but his flag captain, Fawcet Wray, argued against seeking battle. Troubridge was reluctant to do so anyway, knowing that his ships would be both outranged and attacking in daylight, but felt it was the only honourable option. Wray argued that it would be suicide for the squadron to fight the bigger and longer-ranging guns of the Goeben and, as Wray had a particular reputation in the fleet as an expert on gunnery, Troubridge allowed himself to be persuaded. In tears, Troubridge ordered the chase to be abandoned, a decision that caused Wray to say 'Sir, this is the bravest thing you have ever done.' Troubridge's signal was transmitted shortly afterwards:

4.49am, 7/8/14, to Milne:
Being only able to meet Goeben outside the range of our guns and inside his, I have abandoned the chase with my squadron. Goeben evidently going to the Eastern Mediterranean.

The chase abandoned, the Germans made it to Constantinople, and the ships were almost immediately turned over to the Turkish Navy.

=== Court-martial ===
Both Troubridge and Milne came under considerable criticism for their failure to engage and destroy the German squadron, criticism which intensified when it appeared that the presence of the German ships had been influential in the subsequent Turkish decision to enter the war. Troubridge was ordered back to Britain in September, and faced a court of inquiry held at the Navigation School, Portsmouth. After investigating the events surrounding the chase of Goeben and Breslau, the court of inquiry decided to court-martial Troubridge on the grounds of his failure to engage the enemy. The court-martial was held on board HMS Bulwark, moored at Portland, from 5 to 9 November 1914. After deliberating, the court came to the conclusion that the charge was not proved, owing to the nature of his orders and the Admiralty's failure to clarify them, and Troubridge was 'fully and honourably acquitted'. Despite this verdict, the criticism lingered, with accusations that he had let the fleet down. Neither Troubridge nor Milne received another seagoing command, and in January 1915 Troubridge was appointed to head the British naval mission to Serbia.

== Balkan service ==
The British naval mission to Serbia was intended to support Serbian efforts to resist the Austro-Hungarian flotilla, consisting of monitors and patrol vessels, operating on the Danube. For this task, Troubridge commanded a small group of seaman and marines armed with eight 4.7-inch naval guns. They were later reinforced with a 45-foot picket boat fitted with torpedo dropping gear. Allied control of the Danube became strategically vital after the Gallipoli Campaign began, as it prevented river-borne supplies from reaching the Black Sea, from where they could be transported to Turkey. Despite initial success in preventing Austro-Hungarian domination of the waterway, the entry of Bulgaria into the war and the combined Austrian-German-Bulgarian offensive in October caused the disintegration of the Serbian position. Troubridge and his force retreated with the Serbian army to the Adriatic coast, reaching the small port of San Giovanni di Medua. Troubridge was rescued by the Italian Royal Navy and contributed to the overseeing of the withdrawal of the remains of the army and many thousands of refugees to Corfu throughout December and January. On 16 December he was joined by Lieutenant Commander Charles Lester Kerr, his flag-lieutenant, who had escaped with his men across the Albanian mountains during an attempt to save the remaining 4.7-inch guns. They and their party left on 21 January in an Italian destroyer and transferred to HMS Queen, based in Taranto, Italy.

Impressed with his services, Serbian Crown Prince Alexander requested Troubridge as his personal advisor and aide. Troubridge, having been promoted to vice-admiral in June 1916, went out to Salonika to join the reformed Serbian armies. He remained in the Balkans throughout the campaigns of the next two years, which culminated in the final collapse of Bulgaria in September 1918. The French commander-in-chief in the area, Louis Franchet d'Espèrey, appointed Troubridge admiral commanding on the Danube. Troubridge quickly requested the formation of a new naval brigade, to be supported with artillery and torpedo gear in order to prosecute the Danube campaign, but this was rejected by the Admiralty in favour of a gunboat flotilla. Displeased by Troubridge's acceptance of a French appointment, they tried to prevent him from having command of the flotilla.

== Post-war service ==
Troubridge remained in the Balkans for several months after the end of the war, and returned to Britain in early 1919, having been promoted to admiral in January 1919. While he was able to restore his position, he attempted to intervene without orders in the establishment of Béla Kun's Hungarian Soviet Republic in March 1919. His actions brought questionable results, and he remained out of favour with the Admiralty. His experience in the Danube area led to his appointment as president of a provisional inter-allied Danube Commission in 1919. He was replaced by a representative favoured by the Foreign Office on the establishment of the permanent international Danube commission, but when this representative, and a representative favoured by the Admiralty both departed, Troubridge was recalled in June 1920. He had been appointed a Knight Commander of the Order of St Michael and St George in June 1919. His tenure as president of the commission lasted until March 1924, during which time he was placed on the retired list by the Admiralty, on the grounds that his salary came from the commission.

== Personal life ==
Troubridge married Edith Mary Duffus on 29 December 1891. The couple had one surviving son, Thomas Hope Troubridge, who followed his father into the navy and eventually became a vice-admiral. Edith died in 1900 after delivering a stillborn fourth child. Ernest remarried on 10 October 1908. His second wife was the sculptor Margot Elena Gertrude Taylor, more commonly known as Una Vincenzo. The couple had a daughter, but separated in 1919, Una having begun a relationship in 1915 with Marguerite Radclyffe-Hall. Sir Ernest Troubridge died suddenly in Biarritz on 28 January 1926, and was buried there.

== Honours and awards ==
- Grand Cross of the Order of the White Eagle (Kingdom of Serbia)
- Grand Cross of the Order of the White Eagle with Swords (Kingdom of Serbia)
- Grand Officer of the Order of Karageorge Star with Swords (Kingdom of Serbia)
- Commander of the Order of Karageorge Star with Swords (Kingdom of Serbia)
- Officer of the Order of Karageorge Star with Swords (Kingdom of Serbia)
- Grand Cross of the Order of St. Maurice and St. Lazarus (Kingdom of Italy)
- Grand Officer of the Order of the Redeemer (Greece)
- Grand Cross of the Order of the Star of Romania
- Order of the Rising Sun (Japan)
- Knight Commander of the Order of St Michael and St George
- Companion of the Order of the Bath
- Member of the Royal Victorian Order
- Croix de Guerre (France)
- Royal Humane Society silver medal
- Czechoslovak War Cross (Czechoslovakia)

== Notes ==
Military offices
Preceded by Charles Madden	Private Secretary to the First Lord of the Admiralty; 1911–1912	Succeeded by David Beatty
