= Troubridge Hill =

Hill in South Australia

- Location within South Australia

Highest point
- Elevation: 31 m (102 ft)
- Coordinates: 35°9′58″S 137°38′25″E

Geography
- Location: Honiton, South Australia, Australia

Troubridge Hill is a hill on the south coast of Yorke Peninsula in South Australia located in the locality of Honiton about 13.5 kilometres (8.4 miles) south west of Edithburgh and about 3.8 kilometres (2.4 miles) west of Troubridge Point. It was discovered, reported as being a ’hummock upon this low part (of the coastline)’ and named by Matthew Flinders on 24 March 1802 after Sir Thomas Troubridge, 1st Baronet. Since 1980, it has been the site of an operating lighthouse known as the Troubridge Hill Lighthouse. Its adjoining coastline borders a protected area of the same name - the Troubridge Hill Aquatic Reserve.
