= Laura, Lady Troubridge =

19th-century British novelist and etiquette writer (1867–1946)

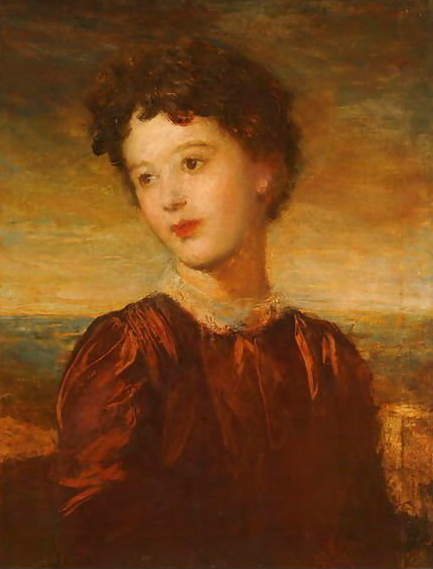
- c. 1880 portrait of Laura Gurney, Lady Troubridge by George Frederic Watts
- Born: Laura Gurney; 1867; London, England
- Died: 8 July 1946 (aged 78–79)
- Occupation: writer
- Spouse: Sir Thomas Henry Cochrane Troubridge, 4th Baronet
- Children: 3
- Parent(s): Charles Henry Gurney; Alice Marie Prinsep

Laura Troubridge, Lady Troubridge (née Gurney; 1867 – 8 July 1946) was a British novelist and etiquette writer. She wrote almost 60 novels and many short stories.

== Life ==
Lady Troubridge (née Gurney) was born in 1867 in London, England. She was the daughter of Charles Henry Gurney and Alice Marie Prinsep and granddaughter of Henry Thoby Prinsep and the salon organiser Sara Monckton (nee Pattle).

Her father died when she was 11 years old, and her sister, Rachel, was 10. In 1897 her mother married a second time, to Colonel John Bourchier Stracey-Clitherow who in 1900 took up residence at Hotham Hall in East Riding, and later, after the death of his father in 1912, Boston Manor House. The Washington Post in 1907 states Troubridge "is the only sister of young Lady Sybil Dudley who as an orphan was adopted by the Duke of Bedford". But in the same article also states Troubridge was "orphaned at a tender age" which seems in conflict with other sources showing her mother died in 1919 when Troubridge was 52 years old. Adding to confusion about Troubridge's early life, Baroness Franzisca von Hedeman states: "Rachel Gurney ... was brought up by the Marchioness of Tavistock, now Adeline, Duchess of Bedford ... Her sister, Laura Gurney, now Lady Trowbridge, who is much admired for her literary taste, was brought up by her Aunt, Lady Henry Somerset, well known in America." Whatever the exact circumstances of her childhood, Troubridge spent much of her youth in Somerset's house where the refined library atmosphere influenced her future as a writer.

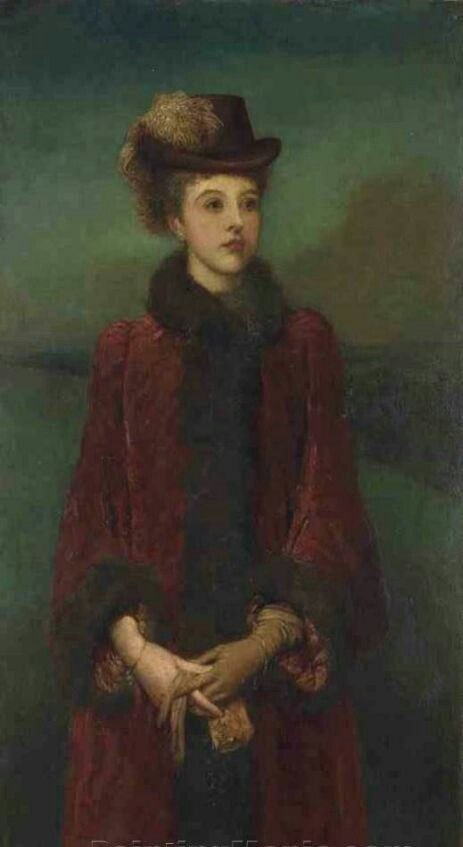
Laura Gurney, Lady Troubridge by George Frederic Watts

She married her cousin Sir Thomas Herbert Cochrane Troubridge, 4th Baronet, on 13 July 1893. They had two daughters and one son. In 1930 their home, Ole Ways in Beaulieu, was completely destroyed by fire: "Lady Troubridge who is a well-known authoress, lost hundreds of sheets of typescript. She was at her desk when the outbreak occurred, but managed to save the manuscripts on which she was engaged."

She died on 8 July 1946 and was buried at Abbey Church, Beaulieu, Hampshire.

== Career ==
She wrote under her title, Lady Troubridge, and authored almost three dozen novels, numerous short stories and, newspaper serial stories and articles.

Her first novel, Paul’s Stepmother, and One Other Story, was published in 1896. After a lapse of some years she wrote her first essay, Thou Woman Thou Gavest, in 1906. It was a brilliant success and was followed by almost annual publications until the late 1930s.

Troubridge published The Millionaire in 1907 and it caused a sensation. The Washington Post wrote: "Lady Troubridge, the facile romancist, whose latest novel, 'The Millionaire', created a sensation in England" and continues, she "depicts in classic style the trials of a young girl who leaves a dingy home in the suburbs of London to take her place in cosmopolitan society. Throughout the story the secret sins of the upper classes are laid bare ... and the innocent who are grabbed by the tentacles of the social octopus find it a herculean task to rescue themselves from its clutches."

His Grace Gives Notice was published in 1922. It has been dramatised in film twice. Once in 1924 and a second time in 1933.

NOTICE

Our English law of succession by which a man may inherit the titles and estates of a noble House of which he is a remote and obscure member is the only explanation of much which, to the uninitiated, seems, and would otherwise be, incredible. The annals of great families contain records of many strange events of which the world at large knows nothing. These family secrets, more or less well kept, are often merely sordid and melodramatic; but now and then an event occurs which is singularly full of real romance. Though you may not find the Duke of St. Bevis in Burke or Debrett, perhaps you may have seen his prototype adorning some humble station, or may meet him later without ever realizing what he has owed to the accident of fortune. – Lady Troubridge, His Grace Gives Notice (1922)

On her book Memories and Reflections (1925) The Guardian wrote that she had “all the advantages of the most fortunate autobiographers ... She has been from childhood in the habit of mixing with beautiful, fashionable and even interesting people” Her memoirs included comments on places she had been, her experiences and people she met. "She has been on both sides of the Channel, to the places where 'everybody' goes" and knew fellow authors, such as Belloe Lownders and Stephen McKenan, and met royalty, King Edward VII and Queen Victoria. The Guardian continues: "Altogether this is a good natured, attractive and chatty book..and the pictures of the authoress' childhood…is particularly pleasant."

She wrote The Book of Etiquette which was first published in 1926. Over the following six decades, until 1987, a further 29 editions were published. In 1939 My Home published excerpts from it as a booklet titled Etiquette and Entertaining. The Book of Etiquette, unlike its predecessors, was focused on a British audience. It was a thorough guide to English social etiquette in upper class society. It intended to help readers steer their way through "unwritten laws" of social behaviour and between old-fashion courtesy and the new spirit of informality. Troubridge became well respected for her views on etiquette even before The Book of Etiquette. The Sheboygan Press, for example, quoted her as the authority on "When to Propose Marriage" in 1911. Her reputation on all things etiquette extended beyond her life. For the film Gosford Park released in 2002, The Book of Etiquette was given to cast members to use for researching etiquette during the 1930s.

She wrote seven society novels for Mills & Boon between 1909 and 1912: The Woman who Forgot; The First Law; The Cheat; Body and Soul; Stormlight; The Girl with the Blue Eyes; and The Creature of Circumstance.

Her short stories were published in magazines such as Britannia and Eve, Cassell's Magazine of Fiction, Marks & Spencer’s Grand Annual, Miss Modern, Nash’s Magazine, The Grand Magazine, The Lady’s Realm, The London Magazine, The Novel Magazine, The Pall Mall Magazine, The Red Magazine, The Sovereign Magazine, The Story-teller and The Yellow Magazine. Troubridge also wrote serial stories for newspapers, The True Heart in 1915 for the Staffordshire Sentinel, is an example of such a story. Her opinions, stories and letters appeared in newspapers far as Australia such as the Sydney Morning Herald and the Daily News (Perth).

Towards the end of her life she wrote for the women’s magazine Home Chat as an agony aunt.

== Bibliography ==
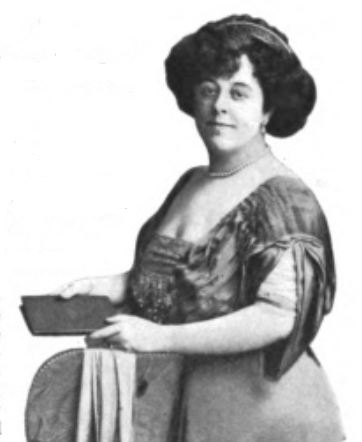
Lady Troubridge, c. 1912

- Paul's Stepmother, and One Other Story, 1896
- The Woman Thou Gavest, 1906
- The Millionaire, 1907
- House Of Cards, 1908
- Marriage Of Blackmail, 1909
- The Cheat, 1909
- The First Law, 1909
- The Woman Who Forgot, 1910
- Body And Soul, 1911
- Storm-Light, 1912
- The Creature Of Circumstance, 1912
- The Girl With The Blue Eyes, 1912
- The Unguarded Hour, 1913
- This Man And This Woman, 1913
- The Half Of His Kingdom, 1915
- The Evil Day, 1916
- Mrs Vernon's Daughter, 1917
- All's Well, Billy, 1918
- O, Perfect Love, 1920
- His Grace Gives Notice, 1922
- Passion Flower, 1923
- Memories And Reflections, 1925
- Dangerous Bonds, 1926
- The Book of Etiquette, 2 volumes, 1926
- The Dusty Angel, 1927
- Exit Marriage, 1929
- The Purse Strings, 1929
- The Story Of Leonora, 1930
- Life Of The Late Lord Montagu Of Beaulieu, with Archibald Marshall, 1930
- The Property Of A Gentleman, 1931
- The Marriages Of Georgia, 1932
- The Brighthavens At Home, 1934
- Etiquette and Entertaining: To Help You On Your Social Way, 1939
- None but the Brave
