= John Manwood (disambiguation) =

John Manwood (died 1610) was an English barrister.

John Manwood may also refer to:

- John Manwood (MP) (died 1653)
- John Manwood (died 1571), MP for Sandwich
