= Peter Manwood =

English politician

Sir Peter Manwood
- Born: 1571
- Died: 1625 (aged 53–54)
- Citizenship: English
- Occupation: Politician

Sir Peter Manwood (1571–1625) was an English politician who sat in the House of Commons at various times between 1589 and 1621.

== Biography ==
Manwood was the eldest son of Sir Roger Manwood of Hackington and his first wife Dorothy Theobald, daughter of John Theobald of Seal. He was admitted as a student at Inner Temple on 20 November 1583. In 1589, he was elected Member of Parliament for Sandwich. He was commissioner for Dover Harbour by 1591. He succeeded to the estates of his father in 1592 and was a justice of the peace for Kent, serving in the court of quarter sessions from 1593 to 1620. In 1593, he was re-elected MP for Sandwich. He was commissioner for grain in 1596 and commissioner for musters by 1597. In 1597 he was re-elected MP for Sandwich. He travelled abroad in 1598 to increase his knowledge and learning as he tended towards more scholastic interests, and became a member of the Antiquarian Society. He was never called to the bar.

In 1601 Manwood was re-elected MP for Sandwich. He became Deputy Lieutenant from 31 December 1601 and was High Sheriff of Kent from 1602 to 1603. He was knighted in 1603. In 1604 he was elected MP for Saltash. He was MP for Kent in 1614 and was elected MP for Romney in 1621. He had to go abroad because he was heavily in debt, but after making arrangements with hs creditors he returned by the end of 1623.

Manwood died in 1625.

== Family ==
Manwood married Frances Hart, daughter of Sir George Hart of Lullingstone, in January 1588 and had at least seven sons and four daughters. His son John revived the family fortunes. One of his daughters, Elizabeth, married Thomas Walsingham.

Parliament of England
| Preceded by Edward Peake; Edward Wood | Member of Parliament for Sandwich; 1589–1601; With: Edward Peake | Succeeded by Sir George Fane; Edward Peake |
| Preceded by Sir Robert Cross; Alexander Nevill | Member of Parliament for Saltash; 1604–1611; With: Thomas Wyvill | Succeeded by Ranulph Crewe; Sir Robert Phelips |
| Preceded by Sir John Scott; Sir John Leveson | Member of Parliament for Kent; 1614; With: Sir Thomas Walsingham | Succeeded by Viscount Lisle; Sir George Fane |
| Preceded by Sir Arthur Ingram; Robert Wilcock | Member of Parliament for Romney; 1621–1622; With: Francis Featherstonehaugh | Succeeded by Francis Featherstonehaugh; Richard Godfrey |
