= Henry Furnese =

Henry Furnese may refer to:

- Henry Furnese (MP, died 1756) (after 1688 – 1756), British merchant and politician, member of parliament (MP) for Dover, for Morpeth, and for New Romney
- Sir Henry Furnese, 1st Baronet (1658–1712), MP for Bramber, and for Sandwich
- Sir Henry Furnese, 3rd Baronet (c. 1716 – 1735), of the Furnese baronets

== See also ==
- Furnese (disambiguation)
