= Joseph Marryat =

Joseph Marryat (7 October 1790 – 24 September 1876) was a British politician.

The son of Joseph Marryat, he was born in Grenada, where his father owned plantations worked by slaves. He followed his father in becoming a shipowner, banker and merchant, and inherited his father's estates and slaves. He joined the West India Committee, which opposed the abolition of slavery.

At the 1826 UK general election, he stood as an independent in Sandwich. He won the seat, which had been represented by his father until 1824. In Parliament, he supported the Great Reform Act and Catholic Emancipation, while continuing to campaign in support of slavery. He later became regarded as a Whig. He held his seat until the 1835 UK general election, when he stood down.

Marryat retired from the family business in 1849, moving to Ystradgynlais where he became co-owner of the Ynyscedwyn Iron Company. He also became an owner of the Price, Marryat bank, which collapsed in 1866. The ironworks also struggled, and on his death in 1876, Marryat left less than £4,000 in his will. He was also known as an expert on pottery and porcelain, and wrote History of Pottery and Porcelain, Mediaeval and Modern.

Parliament of the United Kingdom
Preceded by Henry Bonham; George Warrender	Member of Parliament for Sandwich; 1826 – 1835; With: Edward Owen (1826–1829); Henry Fane (1829–1830); Samuel Grove Price (1830–1831); Edward Troubridge (1831–1835)	Succeeded by Samuel Grove Price; Edward Troubridge
