= Roger Manwood (disambiguation) =

Roger Manwood was an English jurist and MP for Hastings 1555 and Sandwich 1558–1572.

Roger Manwood may also refer to:

- Roger Manwood (died 1534), MP for Sandwich 1523
- Roger Manwood (MP for Peterborough), MP for Peterborough 1614
