= Edward Montagu (died 1665) =

English politician, courtier and naval officer

Edward Montagu (c. 1636 – 2 August 1665) was an English politician, courtier and naval officer. He was the MP for Sandwich, Kent.

== Life ==
He was the eldest son of the second Baron Montagu. He was educated at Westminster School, matriculated at Christ Church, Oxford, on 5 June 1651, and was admitted at Sidney Sussex College, Cambridge, on 25 September 1651. He was created M.A. of Oxford on 9 September 1661.

In 1659, he joined his cousin, Admiral Montagu, with a view to influencing him in favour of the English Restoration, and was acting as a medium of communication between Charles II and the admiral in April 1660. He represented Sandwich in parliament from 1661 to 1665, and was master of the horse to Queen Catharine of Braganza. He was commissioned captain-lieutenant of the King's company in the King's Foot Guards in February 1661.

He was killed in Bergen, Norway in August 1665, in the Battle of Vågen.

== Notes ==
Attribution

This article incorporates text from a publication now in the public domain: Porter, Bertha (1894). "Montagu, Edward (1562-1644)". In Lee, Sidney (ed.). Dictionary of National Biography. Vol. 38. London: Smith, Elder & Co.

Parliament of England
Preceded by James Thurbarne; Henry Oxenden	Member of Parliament for Sandwich; 1661–1665; With: James Thurbarne	Succeeded by James Thurbarne; John Strode
