= Furnese =

Furnese is a surname. Notable people with the surname include:

- Henry Furnese (MP, died 1756) (after 1688 – 1756), British merchant and politician, member of parliament (MP) for Dover, for Morpeth, and for New Romney
- Sir Henry Furnese, 1st Baronet (1658–1712), MP for Bramber, and for Sandwich
- Robert Furnese (1687–1733), English politician

== See also ==
- Furnese baronets
