= John Master (disambiguation) =

John Master was an English physician.

John Master may also refer to:

- John Master (MP) for Sandwich (UK Parliament constituency)

== See also ==
- John Masters (disambiguation)
