= Nicholas Crispe =

Nicholas Crispe may refer to:

- Sir Nicholas Crispe, 1st Baronet (c. 1599–1666), English Royalist and merchant
- Nicholas Crispe (died 1564), MP for Sandwich
