= Sir James Oxenden, 2nd Baronet =

English politician

Member of the British Parliament for Sandwich
- In office 1679–1685, 1689–1690, 1701–1702

Member of the British Parliament for Kent
- In office 1698–1701

Sir James Oxenden, 2nd Baronet (4 April 1641 – 29 September 1708), of Dene, Kent was an English politician who sat in the House of Commons between 1679 and 1702.

Oxenden was the son of Sir Henry Oxenden, 1st Baronet and his second wife Elizabeth Meredith, daughter of Sir William Meredith of Leeds Abbey, Kent. He was knighted on 22 March 1671.

Oxenden sat as a Member of Parliament for Sandwich from 1679 to 1685 and from 1689 to 1690. He succeeded his father as second Baronet in August 1686. Oxenden was then MP for Kent from 1698 to 1701 and MP for Sandwich again from 1701 to 1702.

Oxenden died aged sixty-seven.

Oxenden married firstly Elizabeth Chute, daughter of Edward Chute of Bethersden, and secondly, Arabella Watson sister of Lewis Earl of Rockingham. He had no children and was succeeded in the baronetcy by his brother.

Parliament of England
Preceded by James Thurbarne; John Strode	Member of Parliament for Sandwich; 1679–1685; With: John Thurbarne	Succeeded by John Strode; Sir Philip Parker, Bt
Preceded by John Strode; Sir Philip Parker, Bt	Member of Parliament for Sandwich; 1689–1690; With: John Thurbarne	Succeeded by John Thurbarne; Edward Brent
Preceded by Sir Thomas Roberts, Bt; Viscount Lisle	Member of Parliament for Kent; 1698–1701; With: Sir Stephen Lennard, Bt	Succeeded by Sir Thomas Hales, Bt; Thomas Meredith
Preceded by John Michel; John Taylor	Member of Parliament for Sandwich; 1701–1702; With: Sir Henry Furnese, Bt	Succeeded by Sir Henry Furnese, Bt; John Michel
Baronetage of England
Preceded by Henry Oxenden	Baronet (of Dene); 1686 – 1708	Succeeded by Henry Oxenden
