= John Manwood (MP) =

English politician

Sir John Manwood (died 1653) was an English politician who sat in the House of Commons in 1640.

Manwood was the son of Sir Peter Manwood and a grandson of Roger Manwood. In November 1609, he was admitted at Inner Temple . He was knighted on 3 April 1618. He inherited the estates at St Stephens and in 1637 sold them to Colonel Thomas Colepeper. He was a gentleman of the privy chamber, and was lieutenant-governor of Dover Castle in 1639.

In April 1640, Manwood was elected Member of Parliament for Sandwich in the Short Parliament. He subsequently resided mainly in the Netherlands.

Manwood married firstly in 1627 at St. Bartholomew's Lavinia Ogle, daughter of Sir John Ogle of St. Peter le Poor. He married secondly Cornelia Mescrian of Dort, Holland.

Parliament of England
| Vacant Parliament suspended since 1629 | Member of Parliament for Sandwich; 1640; With: Nathaniel Finch | Succeeded by Sir Thomas Peyton; Sir Edward Partridge |
