= Edward Troubridge =

Royal Navy officer

Rear-Admiral Sir Edward Troubridge Bt CB DL
- Born: c. 1787
- Died: 7 October 1852 (aged 64–65); Belgravia, London
- Relatives: See Troubridge baronets
- Military career
- Allegiance: Great Britain; United Kingdom
- Branch: Royal Navy
- Service years: 1797–1852
- Rank: Rear-Admiral
- Commands: HMS Harrier; HMS Celebes; HMS Greyhound; HMS Armide; HMS Formidable
- Conflicts: French Revolutionary Wars; Battle of Copenhagen; Napoleonic Wars; Action of 26 July 1806; War of 1812; Battle of New Orleans
- Awards: Companion of the Order of the Bath
- Other work: MP for Sandwich (1832–1847)

Rear-Admiral Sir Edward Thomas Troubridge, 2nd Baronet, CB, DL (c. 1787 – 7 October 1852) was a Royal Navy officer and politician who served in the French Revolutionary and Napoleonic Wars and the War of 1812. He later served for fifteen years as the member of parliament for Sandwich, Kent.

== Biography ==
=== Family background and early life ===
Troubridge was the only son of Rear-Admiral Sir Thomas Troubridge, Bt., and Frances Northall, the daughter of Captain John Northall. He was educated at Dr. Charles Burney's school at Greenwich.

=== Wartime naval career ===
Troubridge entered the Navy on 21 January 1797 as a volunteer on board the ship Cambridge, the guard ship at Plymouth under the command of Captain Richard Boger. He was discharged in April 1799, and in January 1801 joined the ship Achille, Captain George Murray, as a midshipman. He followed Murray into the Edgar, seeing action at the battle of Copenhagen on 2 April 1801, and subsequently into London, until transferred in May 1802 to Leander, Captain James Oughton, for a short time. In July 1803, he joined the Victory, flagship of Lord Nelson in the Mediterranean, and in August 1804, moved into the frigate Narcissus, Captain Ross Donnelly, serving until February 1805.

On 22 February 1806 he was promoted to lieutenant aboard the Blenheim, his father's flagship in the East Indies, and in March was appointed acting-commander of the 18-gun brig-sloop Harrier. On 4 July 1806 Harrier and the frigate Greyhound, Captain Charles Elphinstone, destroyed the Dutch East India Company brig Christian Elizabeth under the fort of Manado. Two days later, off the island of Tidore, the two ships captured the Dutch 12-gun Belgica. On 26 July they fought a Dutch squadron off Sulawesi, consisting of the 40-gun frigate Pallas, the 20-gun corvette William, and the armed Indiamen Vittoria and Batavia, both richly laden. Only the William escaped capture. His share of the prize money for the captures was £26,000. In a letter to John Markham at the Admiralty following the action his father commented: "Elphinstone says Tom in the Harrier behaved like a brave, good fellow; had he done otherwise I would with great composure put a pistol ball through his nob..." In August 1806 Troubridge was appointed acting-captain of the frigate Macassar (formerly the Dutch Pallas), moving to the Greyhound in October. His promotion to commander was confirmed on 5 September 1806, and to post-captain on 28 November 1807.

Sir Thomas Troubridge was superseded as commander-in-chief in the East Indies by Sir Edward Pellew, and appointed commander-in-chief at the Cape of Good Hope. At Madras his flagship Blenheim was inspected and found to be unfit for further service, being hogged and taking on water even when at anchor. Despite the protests of her captain, Austin Bissell, Troubridge insisted on taking her to the Cape. Blenheim sailed on 12 January 1807, in company with the frigate Java, Captain George Pigot, and the sloop Harrier. On 5 February Harrier lost contact with the other ships near the island of Rodrigues. They were never seen again. Pellew ordered Troubridge in Greyhound to search for the missing ships. Starting at Rodrigues, he retraced their course to the Île de France, sending an officer ashore under a flag of truce to gain information. The French authorities informed him that the ships had been sighted at some distance off the Île Bourbon. At Île Sainte-Marie off Madagascar they learned that the ships had put into the harbour to take on water and fresh meat, before sailing for the Cape. There being no further sightings it was assumed that the ships had foundered during a storm. On the death of his father, Troubridge succeeded to the baronetcy. He was invalided home in January 1808.

On 5 February 1813 Troubridge was appointed to the 38-gun frigate Armide, for service in the War of 1812 against the United States. Armide, in company with Endymion, captured the 17-gun American privateer Herald on 15 August 1814, and the next day Armide alone captured the French 16-gun letter of marque Invincible. During the operations against New Orleans in January 1815 Troubridge served as commander of the Naval Brigade, and was highly praised for his efforts. Armide was paid off in May 1815.

=== Post-war career ===
After the war Troubridge bought the estate "Rockville" near North Berwick, but he and his family spent most of the next 15 years living in Italy, France and Belgium. They eventually returned to England in December 1830, and Troubridge applied to the Admiralty for a command. In March 1831 he was appointed commander-in-chief at Cork, flying his flag in the frigate Stag, which he joined on 15 April. However, at the request of the government he stood in the general election of 1831, and was elected second member for the town and port of Sandwich in May. He spent much of the rest of the year on leave of absence from his ship in order to attend Parliament and vote in favour of the Great Reform Act. On 30 June 1831 Troubridge was appointed naval aide-de-camp to King William, and remained in that post for Queen Victoria until 1841.

In March 1832 he was ordered to take Stag to Madeira to observe developments in the Portuguese Civil War. By July 1832 Stag was cruising off the Portuguese coast. When offered command of Malabar on foreign service, he turned it down, wishing to remain in Stag, but in October 1832 he found himself unemployed. Troubridge was re-elected to Parliament in the 1832 election, and again in 1835 and 1841, serving until 1847.

Troubridge served on the Board of Admiralty from 22 April 1835 serving as Fourth Naval Lord until 1837, then as Third Naval Lord until June 1841, and then briefly as Second Naval Lord before he resigned from the Admiralty on 23 August 1841 to take command of the 84-gun ship Formidable in the Mediterranean. He was made a Companion of the Order of the Bath by the newly crowned Queen Victoria on 20 July 1838. He was promoted to rear admiral on 23 November 1841, and was also a Deputy Lieutenant for Haddingtonshire.

Troubridge died on 7 October 1852, at his house in Eaton Place, Belgravia.

== Personal life ==
On 18 October 1810, he married Anna Maria Cochrane, the daughter of Admiral the Honourable Sir Alexander Cochrane, sister of Rear Admiral Sir Thomas John Cochrane, and cousin of Vice-Admiral Thomas Cochrane, 10th Earl of Dundonald. They had four sons and three daughters, including:

- Major Sir Thomas St. Vincent Hope Cochrane Troubridge, 3rd baronet.
- Captain Edward Norwich Troubridge, RN, who died serving in China in 1850.
- Charlotte Frances Troubridge (d 25 March 1900, aged 74), who lived in Kensington.

== Arms ==
Coat of arms of Edward Troubridge

Crest
A dexter arm embowed habited Azure holding a flagstaff thereon a flag azure charged with two keys in saltire Or.
Escutcheon
Or on a bridge embattled of three arches through which water is flowing towards the base Proper a tower of the second thereon hoisted a broad pennant flying towards the sinister on a canton Azure two keys in saltire the wards upwards Or.
Motto
Ne Cede Arduis

Parliament of the United Kingdom
Preceded by Joseph Marryatt; Samuel Grove Price	Member of Parliament for Sandwich; 1831–1847; With: Joseph Marryatt 1831–1835; Samuel Grove Price 1835–1837; James Rivett Carnac 1837–1839; Sir Rufane Shaw Donkin 1839–1841; Hugh Hamilton Lindsay 1841–1847	Succeeded by Lord Clarence Paget; Charles William Grenfell
Military offices
Preceded by Sir Maurice Berkeley	Fourth Naval Lord; 1835–1837	Succeeded by Sir Maurice Berkeley
Preceded by Sir George Elliot	Third Naval Lord; 1837–1841	Succeeded by Sir Samuel Pechell
Preceded by Sir William Parker	Second Naval Lord; June 1841 – September 1841	Succeeded by Sir William Gage
Baronetage of Great Britain
Preceded by Thomas Troubridge	Baronet (of Plymouth); 1807–1852	Succeeded by Thomas Troubridge
