= William Ive (Sandwich MP) =

William Ive (died c. 1387) was an English Member of Parliament.

== Family ==
Ive's father was also named William Ive, who was mayor of Sandwich in 1348–9. Ive married a woman named Alice, and they had three daughters, Constance, Margaret, and Agnes, who inherited Ive's estate.

== Career ==
He was a Member of the Parliament of England for Sandwich in May 1382, 1385 and 1386. He was Mayor of Sandwich 1376 to 1380. He owned land across East Kent, including in Downhamford, Wingham, Cornilo, Eastry, Deal and Woodnesborough.
