= James Macgregor (MP) =

British banker, railway chairman and politician

James Macgregor (1 August 1808 – 5 September 1858) was a British banker, railway chairman and politician.

== Early life ==
James Macgregor, Esq. (sometimes spelled Mac Gregor or M'Gregor) was born in Liverpool, England on 1 August 1808, the son of Alexander Macgregor, Esq. of Bloomhill in Manchester, England.

== Business career ==
James Macgregor began his business career as a banker in Liverpool, serving as the manager of Liverpool Commercial Banking Company. In September 1845 Macgregor was elected chairman and managing director of South Eastern Railway. The position gave Macgregor full autonomy over the railway's operations. After nine challenging years dealing with the line's expansion and acrimonious relations with other railways, Macgregor resigned in 1854.

In addition to his private business responsibilities, Macgregor served as MP for Sandwich, England beginning in 1852 until his defeat in 1857.

== Family ==
James Macgregor was firstly married on 3 November 1829 at St Marylebone Parish Church to Jane Small, eldest daughter of London merchant, Robert Small, Esq. of York Terrace, Regent's Park, London. Jane and her father were members of the Smalls of Dirnanean, Perthshire, Scotland. The couple had nine children before Jane Small's death in 1845.

Macgregor secondly married Catherine Pendarvis Lochner at St Mary on Paddington Green Church on 11 August 1849, and with her had an additional five children, including Lt.-Col. James Pendarvis Macgregor.

A grandson was John Cecil Currie DSO** MC (1898 – 26 June 1944).

James Macgregor died in London on 5 September 1858, aged 50.

== See also ==
- George Forrester and Company

Parliament of the United Kingdom
Preceded by Charles Grenfell; Lord Charles Clinton	Member of Parliament for Sandwich; 1852 – 1857; With: Lord Charles Clinton	Succeeded by Edward Knatchbull-Hugessen; Lord Clarence Paget
