= James Rivett-Carnac =

Indian-born British statesman and politician

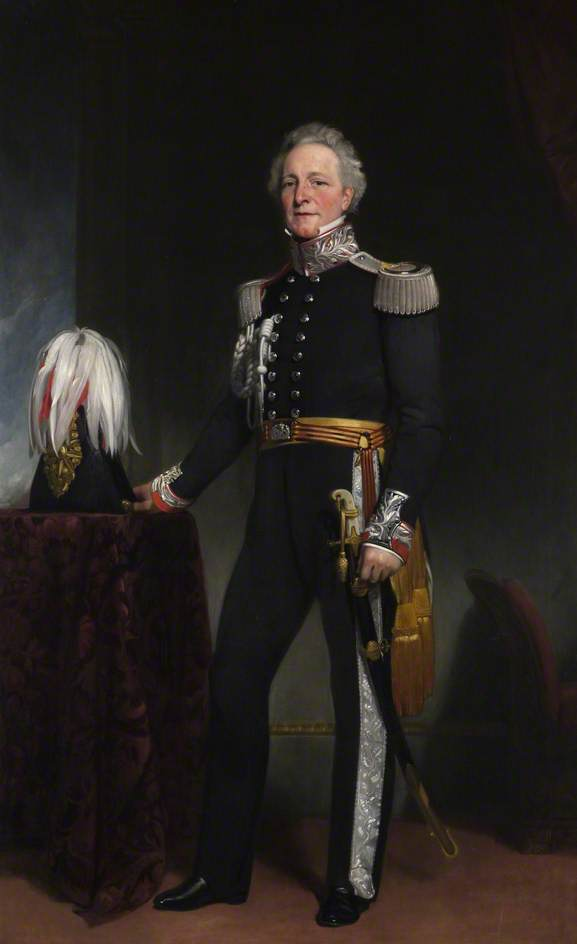
Rivett-Carnac by Henry William Pickersgill c. 1840

Sir James Rivett-Carnac, 1st Baronet (11 November 1784 – 28 January 1846) was an Indian-born British statesman and politician who served as Governor of the Bombay Presidency in British India from 1838 to 1841.

== Career ==
Born in Bombay in 1784, Carnac began nearly three decades of service with the East India Company in India in 1801 and was a director of the Company for various periods between 1827 and 1838. He succeeded Robert Grant as Governor of the Bombay Presidency in 1838, serving for three years in that role.

He was a Member of Parliament (MP) for Sandwich from 1837 to 1839 and was elected a Fellow of the Royal Society in May 1838.

== Personal life ==
Born James Rivett, his surname was legally changed to Rivett-Carnac by royal licence in 1801 when his father James, a member of the Bombay Government Council and chairman of the East India Company, was made testamentary by his brother-in-law, General John Carnac, the husband of Elizabeth Rivett (1751–1780).

In 1815 he married Anna-Maria Richardes, the eldest daughter of William Richardes of Penglais, and had three sons: John (1818–1893), William (1822–1874) and Charles (1824–1902). His descendants include the sailor Charles Rivett-Carnac and the Canadian police commissioner Charles Rivett-Carnac, as well as the colonial administrator Sir Richard Temple and his son Sir Richard Carnac Temple and the fashion designer Lulu Guinness.

In 1836 Rivett-Carnac was made a baronet. He died on 28 January 1846 at what was Rookcliff House, Milford-on-Sea.

His younger brother, Admiral John Rivett-Carnac (1796–1869), was an early explorer of Western Australia.

Parliament of the United Kingdom
Preceded by Samuel Grove Price; Sir Edward Troubridge, Bt	Member of Parliament for Sandwich; 1837–1839; With: Sir Edward Troubridge, Bt	Succeeded by Rufane Shaw Donkin; Sir Edward Troubridge, Bt
Political offices
Preceded by Robert Grant	Governor of Bombay; 1838–1841	Succeeded by George William Anderson
Baronetage of the United Kingdom
New creation	Baronet (of Derby); 1836–1846	Succeeded by John Rivett-Carnac
