= Henry Fane (British Army officer) =

British Army general

General Sir Henry Fane GCB
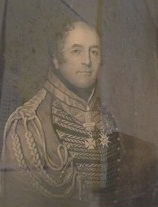
- Born: 26 November 1778
- Died: 24 March 1840 (aged 61); At sea, off São Miguel Island
- Military career
- Allegiance: United Kingdom
- Branch: British Army
- Service years: 1792–1840
- Rank: General
- Commands: 1st Dragoon Guards; 6th (Light) Brigade, Anglo-Portuguese Army; 2nd Brigade, 3rd Division; Independent Cavalry Brigade; II Corps cavalry Army of Occupation of France cavalry Indian Army
- Conflicts: Irish Rebellion of 1798; Peninsular War; First Anglo-Afghan War
- Awards: Knight Grand Cross of the Order of the Bath; Army Gold Cross with 4 clasps
- Other work: Member of Parliament

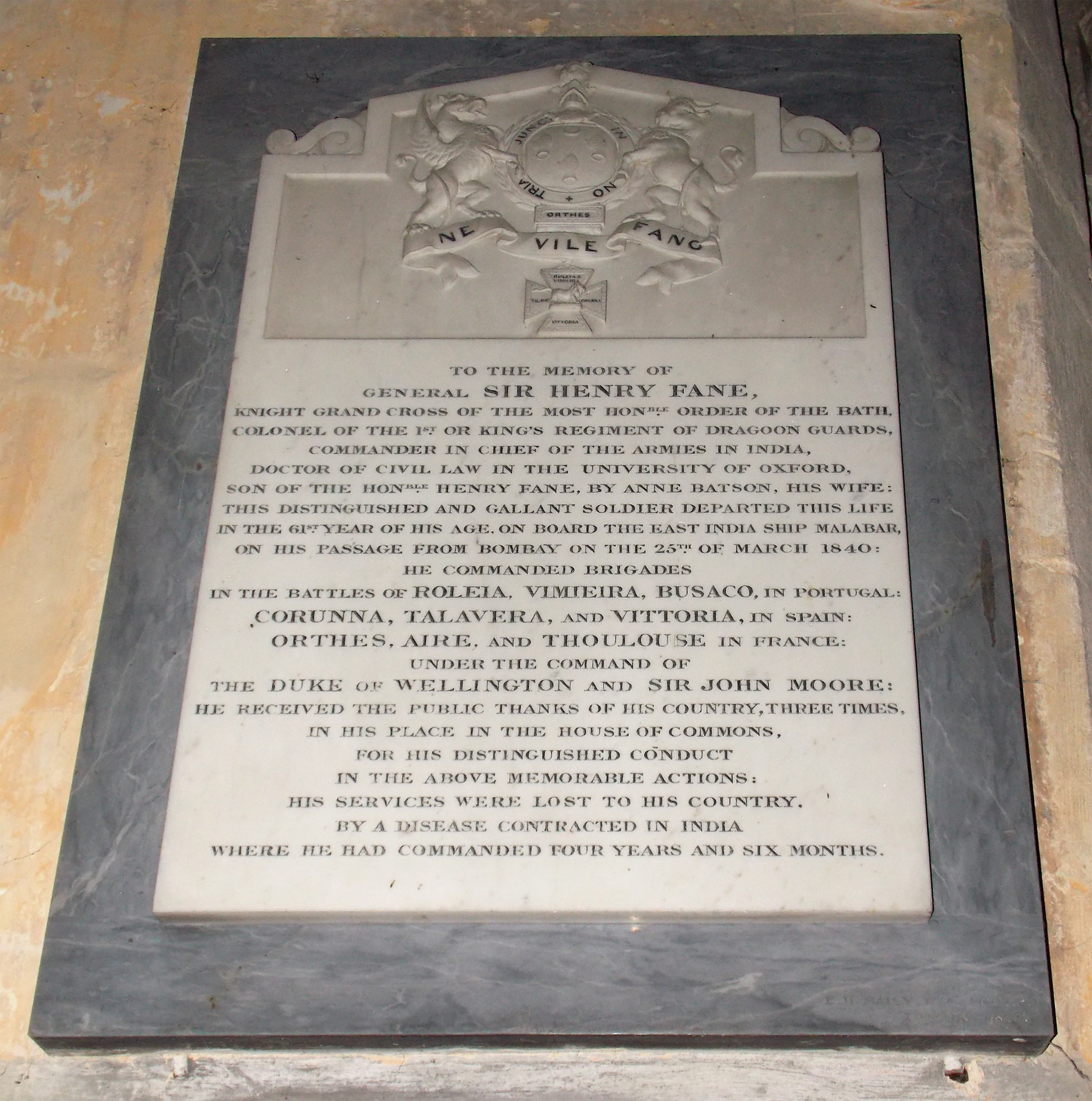
Mural monument of Sir Henry Fane, St Nicholas' Church, Fulbeck

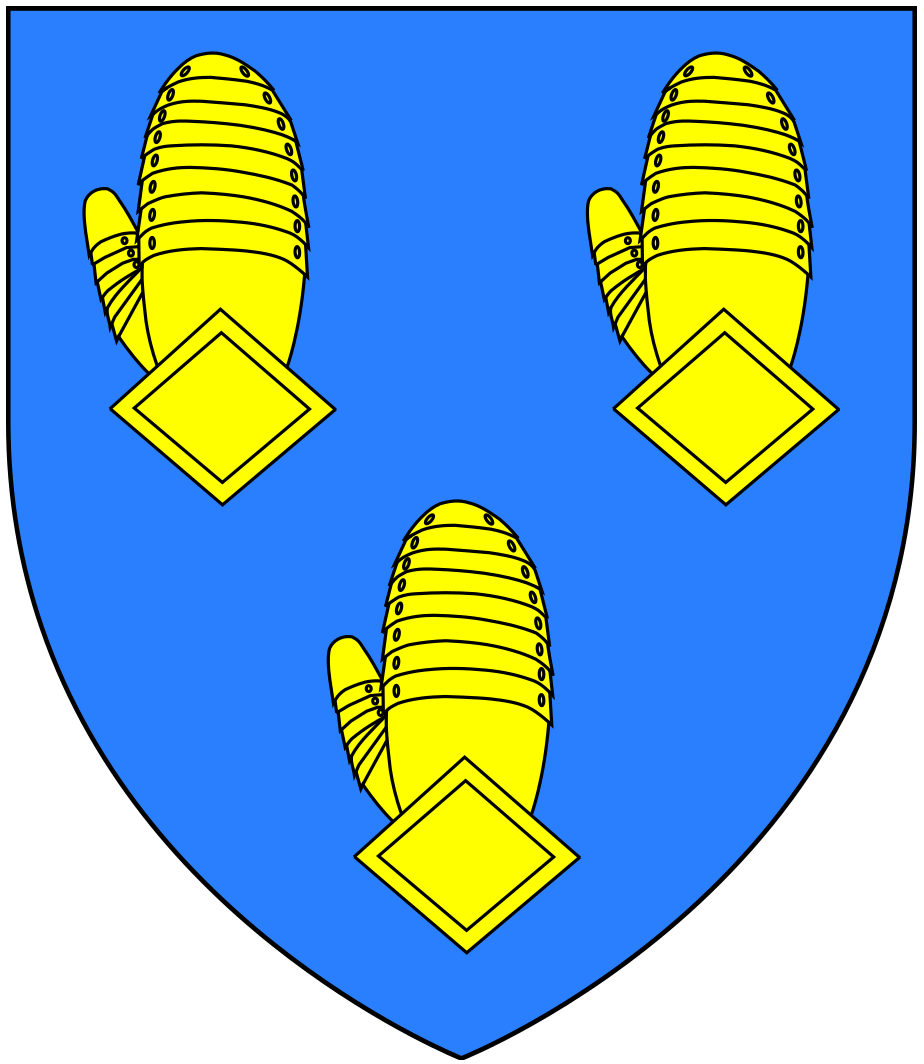
Arms of Fane, Earls of Westmorland: Azure, three dexter gauntlets back affrontée or

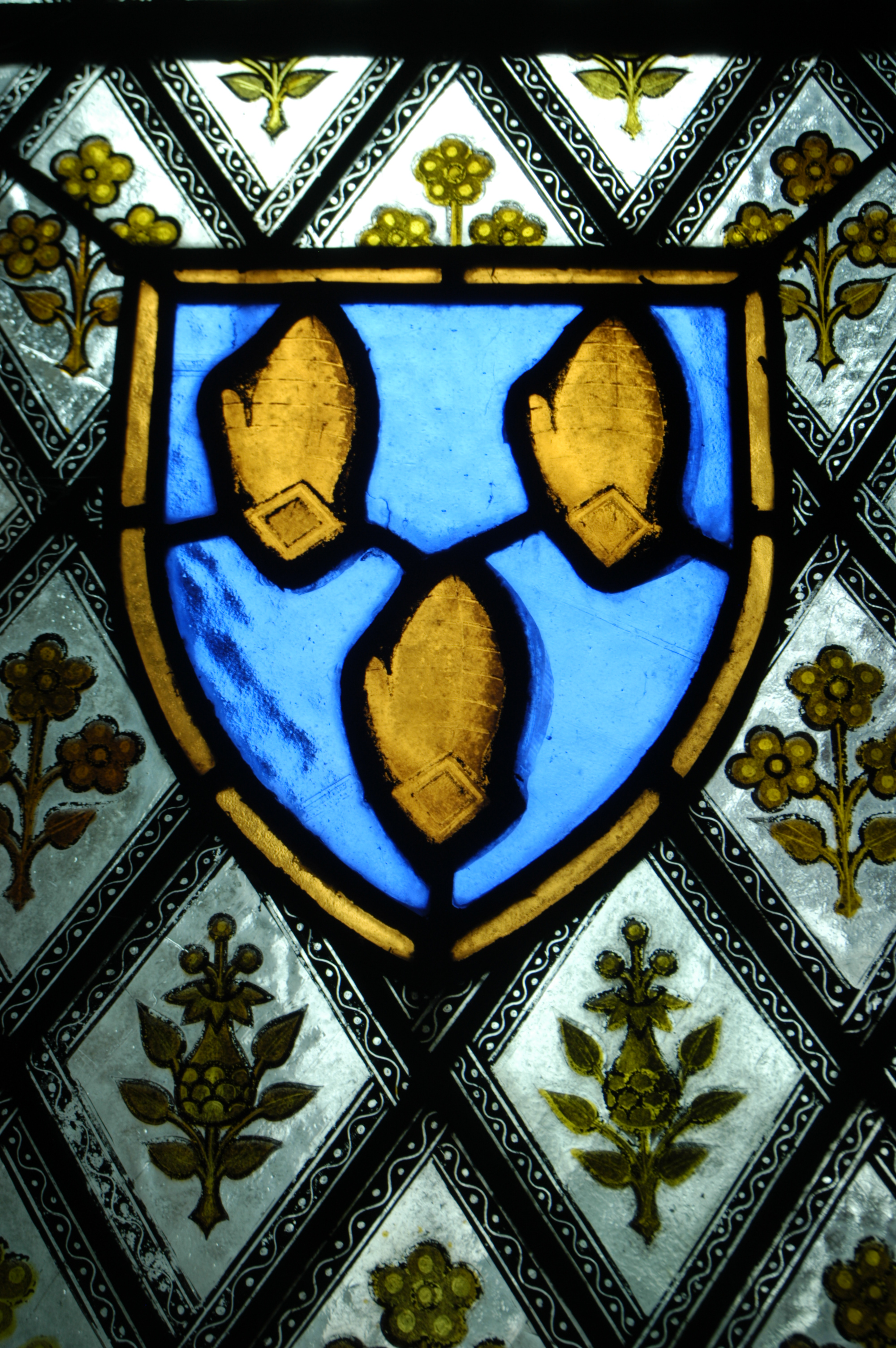
Arms of Fane of Fulbeck (as Fane, Earls of Westmorland) in a stained glass window in Fulbeck Church, Lincolnshire

General Sir Henry Fane GCB (26 November 1778 – 24 March 1840) commanded brigades under Arthur Wellesley, 1st Duke of Wellington during several battles during the Peninsular War, and served both as a member of Parliament and Commander-in-Chief of India.

== Origins ==
He was the eldest son of Hon. Henry Fane (d.1802), of Fulbeck Hall, Lincolnshire, younger son of Thomas Fane, 8th Earl of Westmorland.

== Military career ==
Fane joined the 6th Dragoon Guards as a cornet in 1792 and served as aide-de-camp to the Lord Lieutenant of Ireland, John Fane, before obtaining a lieutenancy in the 55th Regiment of Foot. He was promoted to captain-lieutenant in the 4th Dragoons in 1795; to major the following year and to lieutenant-colonel in 1797, subsequently serving throughout the rebellion that year. On 1 January 1805, following his removal to the lieutenant-colonency of the 1st King's Dragoon Guards, he was appointed aide-de-camp to King George III, which made him a colonel in the army.

=== Peninsular War ===
As a brigadier general, Fane commanded a brigade in Wellesley's army at the Battle of Vimeiro in August 1808. His brigade, which included the 1/50th West Kents, 5/60th Royal Americans, and four companies of the 2/95th Rifles, took a key part in repelling the French frontal attacks on Vimeiro village.

During Sir John Moore's expedition in Spain, Fane commanded the 2nd Brigade (1/38th 1st Staffordshire, 1/79th Cameron Highlanders, 1/82nd Prince of Wales Volunteers Foot) in Alexander Mackenzie Fraser's 3rd Division. The 3rd Division was present but not engaged at the Battle of Corunna in January 1809.

Fane missed the Second Battle of Porto, since his heavy cavalry brigade (3rd Prince of Wales Dragoon Guards, 4th Queen's Own Dragoons) was guarding the Portuguese frontier at Abrantes. While commanding the same brigade, he fought at the Battle of Talavera in July 1809.

On 13 May 1810, Fane transferred to command a brigade that included the 13th Light Dragoons and four Portuguese mounted regiments. He was present at the Battle of Bussaco, while attached to Rowland Hill's 2nd Division. He went home ill before the end of 1810.

On 24 April 1813, Fane was promoted to major general on the staff. Posted to command a brigade consisting of the 3rd Dragoon Guards and the 1st Royal Dragoons on 20 May, he fought at the Battle of Vitoria in June. In that battle, his cavalry fought with Hill's Right Column, being lightly engaged.

During late 1813, Wellington sent most of his cavalry to the rear since they were almost useless in the rough terrain of the Pyrenees. In January 1814, Fane transferred to lead a brigade that included the 13th and 14th Light Dragoons. There is evidence that Fane effectively commanded both his old and new brigades in the final battles in southern France. Wellington called his cavalry forward in February, his light cavalry arriving first. Fane's brigade fought at the Battle of Orthez and was present at the Battle of Toulouse in April.

For his Peninsula service, Fane was awarded the Army Gold Cross with one clasp for the battles of Vimeiro, Corunna, Talavera, Vitoria, and Orthez.

== Later career ==
He was made a KCB in 1815 and a GCB in 1826. Fane sat as MP for Lyme Regis in 1802–1816, MP for Sandwich in 1829–1830 and MP for Hastings in 1830–1831. He was named Commander-in-Chief of India in 1835.

He died on 24 March 1840, aged 61. His tomb in Fulbeck was designed by Edward Hodges Baily.

== Mistress and illegitimate issue ==
Fane formed a "strong attachment" to Isabella Gorges, a daughter of Hamilton Gorges, and since 1791 the wife of Edward Cooke, described in his will as "of Avon" (i.e. Avon Tyrrell, Sopley, Hampshire). From 1801 Fane and Mrs Cooke lived together as man and wife, and had six illegitimate children, of which three survived infancy:

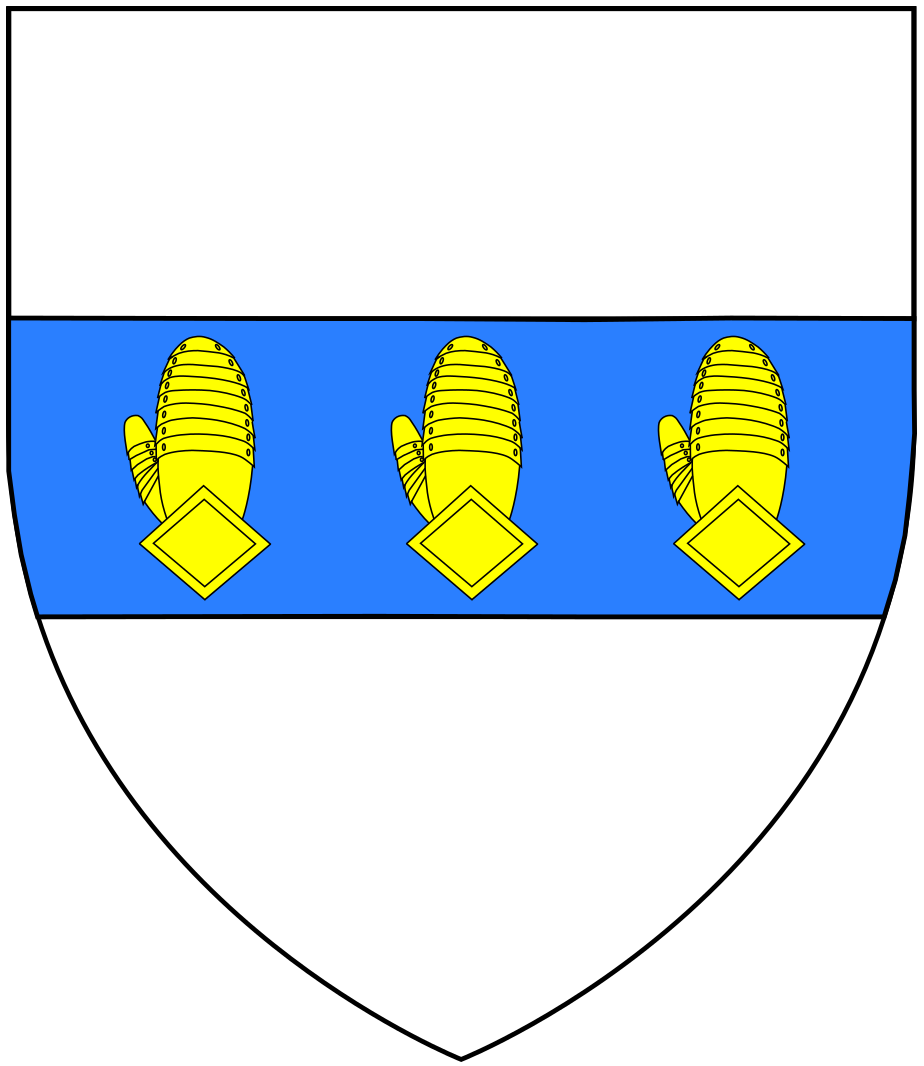
Arms of Fane of Boyton, illegitimate issue of Gen. Henry Fane: Argent, on a fess azure three dexter gauntlets appaumy or, a differenced version of Fane, Earl of Westmorland

- Col. Henry Fane (1802–1836), life tenant of Fulbeck Hall, Lincolnshire, under the will of his father. Started his military career as Capt. 4th Regiment, Dragoon Guards. Three of his sons were surviving in 1880.
- Isabella Fane (1804–1880), spinster. Her letters from India, while acting as her father's hostess between 1835 and 1838, are described as "corrective to the notion that all Englishwomen in India were of the straight-laced memsahib type – snobbish, imperious and racially prejudiced". She returned to England but she could not get on with her family and went to live and die in France.
- Rev. Arthur Fane (1809–1872), vicar of Warminster, Wiltshire 1841–1859 and later appointed rector of Fulbeck by his father. Educated at Exeter College, Oxford. Married Lucy Bennett, daughter and heiress of John Benett MP of Pyt House, Wiltshire, and Boyton Manor, Wilts. Six children surviving in 1880. Appointed Prebendary of Salisbury. Served as domestic chaplain to his cousin the Earl of Westmorland. His grandson Major Henry Nevile Fane (1883–1947), Coldstream Guards (son of his third son Sir Edmund Douglas Veitch Fane (1837–1900) KCMG) married Hon. Harriet Trefusis (d.1958), daughter and senior co-heiress of Charles Hepburn-Stuart-Forbes-Trefusis, 21st Baron Clinton(d.1957). Major Henry Fane's grandson (by his son Capt. Charles Nevile Fane) was Gerard Nevile Mark Fane, who assumed the additional surname of Trefusis following the death of his grandmother Harriet, and became 22nd Baron Clinton in 1965, having claimed the termination of the 1957 abeyance of that title.

== Footnotes ==
Parliament of the United Kingdom
Preceded by Hon. Henry Fane; Hon. Thomas Fane	Member of Parliament for Lyme Regis; 1802–1818; With: Hon. Thomas Fane 1802–1806; Lord Burghersh 1806–1816; John Thomas Fane 1816–1818	Succeeded by John Thomas Fane; Vere Fane
Preceded by Joseph Marryat; Sir Edward Owen	Member of Parliament for Sandwich; 1829–1830; With: Joseph Marryat	Succeeded by Joseph Marryat; Samuel Grove Price
Preceded by Evelyn Denison; Joseph Planta	Member of Parliament for Hastings; 1830–1831; With: Joseph Planta	Succeeded by John Ashley Warre; Frederick North
Military offices
Preceded by Sir William Payne, Bt	Colonel of the 23rd Regiment of (Light) Dragoons; 1807–1814	Succeeded by Sir George Anson
Preceded by Miles Staveley	Colonel of the 4th (Royal Irish) Dragoon Guards; 1814–1827	Succeeded by Sir George Anson
Preceded by William Cartwright	Colonel of the 1st (The King's) Dragoon Guards; 1827–1840	Succeeded by Sir William Lumley
Preceded by Sir Herbert Taylor	Surveyor-General of the Ordnance; 1829–1831	Succeeded by William Leader Maberly
Preceded by Sir James Watson	Commander-in-Chief, India; 1835–1839	Succeeded by Sir Jasper Nicolls
