= Lord Clarence Paget =

Royal Navy Admiral, politician and sculptor (1811–1895)

Admiral The Right Honourable Lord Clarence Paget GCB
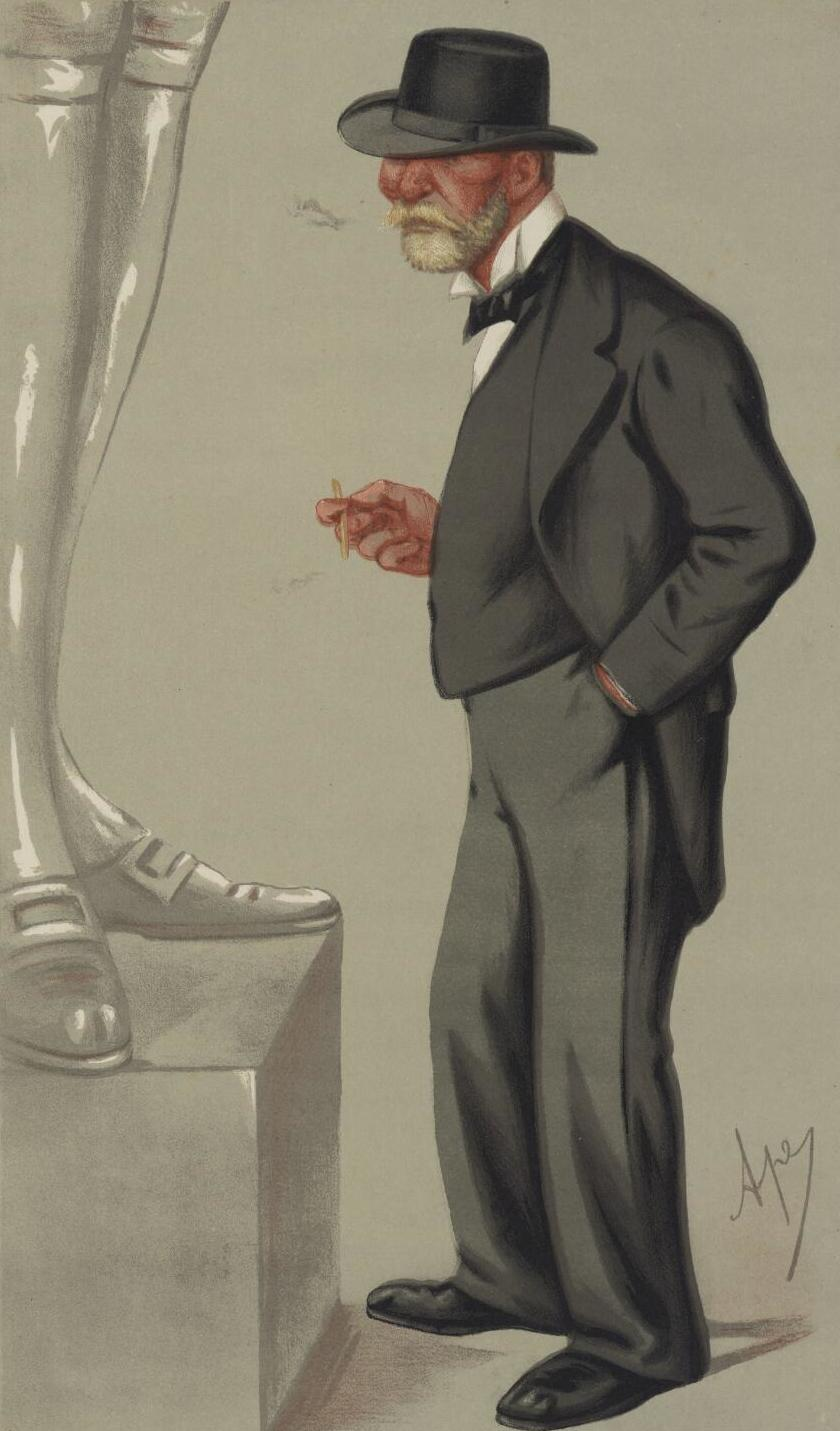
- Lord Clarence Paget, by Carlo Pellegrini, 1875
- Born: 17 June 1811
- Died: 22 March 1895 (aged 83)
- Military career
- Allegiance: United Kingdom
- Branch: Royal Navy
- Service years: 1827–1876
- Rank: Admiral
- Commands: HMS Pearl; HMS Howe; HMS Aigle; HMS Princess Royal; Mediterranean Fleet
- Conflicts: Greek War of Independence; Crimean War
- Awards: Knight Commander of the Order of the Bath

Admiral Lord Clarence Edward Paget GCB PC (17 June 1811 – 22 March 1895) was a British naval officer, politician, and sculptor.

== Naval career ==
Born the younger son of the 1st Marquess of Anglesey, Paget in 1827 like many younger sons of nobility entered the Royal Navy as a midshipman on the second-rate ship-of-the-line HMS Asia and took part in the Battle of Navarino in 1827. Promoted to commander in 1834, he took charge of HMS Pearl and, promoted to captain in 1839, he commanded the first-rate ship-of-the-line HMS Howe and then the fifth-rate frigate HMS Aigle.

Paget attempted to enter Parliament as a Liberal for Southampton in 1837, but was returned as a member for Sandwich in 1847, retaining the seat until July 1852.

Paget served as secretary to the Master-General of the Ordnance from 1846 to 1853. He commanded the second-rate ship-of-the-line HMS Princess Royal in the expedition to the Baltic in 1854 during the Crimean War (1854–1856). Again Member of Parliament for Southampton from March 1857, he was appointed Secretary to the Admiralty in June 1859 but accepted the Chiltern Hundreds (i.e., resigned) in March 1866. He was promoted to vice admiral in 1865 and was Commander-in Chief, Mediterranean Fleet from 1866 to 1869.

Paget retired in 1876. He died in 1895 at the age of 83.

== Family ==
In 1852 Paget married Martha Stuart, the youngest daughter of Admiral Sir Robert Waller Otway, Bt.

Parliament of the United Kingdom
Preceded by Hugh Hamilton Lindsay; Sir Edward Troubridge	Member of Parliament for Sandwich; 1847 – 1852; With: Charles Grenfell; Lord Charles Clinton	Succeeded by James Macgregor; Lord Charles Clinton
Preceded by Lord Charles Clinton; James Macgregor	Member of Parliament for Sandwich; 1857 – 1866; With: Edward Knatchbull-Hugessen	Succeeded by Charles Capper; Edward Knatchbull-Hugessen
Political offices
Preceded by Henry Thomas Lowry-Corry	First Secretary of the Admiralty; 1859–1866	Succeeded by Thomas Baring
Military offices
Preceded by Sir Robert Smart	Commander-in-Chief, Mediterranean Fleet; 1866–1869	Succeeded by Sir Alexander Milne
