= Parliamentary and Financial Secretary to the Admiralty =

United Kingdom Office of the Parliamentary and Financial Secretary to the Admiralty
- Royal Arms as used by His Majesty's Government

- Flag of the Secretary to the Admiralty
- Ministry of Defence
- Style: The Right Honourable (Formal prefix); Secretary to the Admiralty
- Member of: British Cabinet; Board of Admiralty
- Seat: Westminster, London
- Appointer: The British Monarch on advice of the Prime Minister
- Term length: No fixed term
- Formation: 1625–1959
- First holder: Sir Edward Nicholas
- Final holder: Charles Ian Orr-Ewing
- Website: www.gov.uk

The Parliamentary and Financial Secretary to the Admiralty also known as the Parliamentary and Financial Secretary to the Board of Admiralty was a position on the Board of Admiralty and a civil officer of the British Royal Navy. It was usually filled by a Member of Parliament. Although he attended Board of Admiralty meetings informally he was not made a full member of that Board until 1929. He served as the deputy to the First Lord of the Admiralty in Parliament and was mainly responsible for all naval finance and spending proposals from 1625 until 1959.

== History ==
The office was originally created in 1625 with the post holders holding titles under various names such as Secretaries to the Lords Admiral, Admiralty, Committees and Commissions. In July 1660 the post of Secretary to the Admiralty was formally created which lasted until 18 June 1763 when the office was then restyled First Secretary to the Admiralty this remained in place until 1870 when the First Secretary was renamed Parliamentary Secretary to the Admiralty, while the office of Second Secretary to the Admiralty was renamed Permanent Secretary to the Admiralty. In 1886, the Parliamentary Secretary was renamed Parliamentary and Financial Secretary to the Admiralty. In 1929 the Parliamentary and Financial Secretary is made a full member of the Board of Admiralty. In 1930, the Parliamentary and Financial Secretary served as Civil Lord to the Board of Admiralty. In 1959 the office of Parliamentary and Financial Secretary was abolished with the approval of parliament. In 1964 the Admiralty and thus Board of Admiralty was also abolished and merged into a new larger Ministry of Defence under the control of the Minister of State and Under-Secretary of State for the Navy.

== Responsibilities ==
His duties have included at various times

- All proposals for new and unusual expenditure
- All questions involving reference to the treasury financially
- Accounts cash, store, and dockyard expense.
- Contract business except as dealt with by the controller
- Finance
- Estimates
- Exchequer and audit department—questions with
- Expenditure generally
- General labour questions, including annual petitions
- Payment of hire of ships
- Purchases and sales of naval and victualling stores
- Purchase and sale of ships
- Purchase and sale of stores generally.
- Questions involving reference to the treasury financially, except as provided for under civil lord

== Office holders ==
=== Secretaries to the Lords Admiral, Admiralty, Committees and Commissions ===
Included:
Notes: From 1645 until 1652 there were two joint secretaries.

- Sir Edward Nicholas, 1625–1638
- Sir Thomas Smith, 1638–1645
- William Jessop and Robert Coytmore, (jointly), 1645–1652
- Robert Blackborne, 1652– July 1660

=== Secretaries to the Admiralty ===
Included:

- Sir William Coventry, July 1660 – 4 September 1667
- Matthew Wren, 4 September 1667 – June 1672
- Sir John Werden, July 1672 – June 1673
- Samuel Pepys, June 1673 – May 1679
- Thomas Hayter May 1679 – February 1680
- John Brisbane, February 1680 – May 1684
- Samuel Pepys, May 1684 – March 1689
- Phineas Bowles, March 1689 – January 1690
- James Southerne, January 1690 – August 1694
- William Bridgeman, August 1694–26 September 1698 joint with Josiah Burchett until 24 June 1698
- Josiah Burchett, 26 September 1698 – 20 May 1702
- George Clarke, 20 May 1702 – 25 October 1705 joint with Josiah Burchett
- Josiah Burchett, 25 October 1705 – 29 April 1741
- Thomas Corbett, 1741–1751 joint with Josiah Burchett until 14 October 1742
- John Clevland, 30 April 1751 – 18 June 1763

=== First Secretaries to the Admiralty ===
Included:

- Philip Stephens, 18 June 1763 – 3 March 1795
- Evan Nepean, 3 March 1795 – 21 January 1804
- William Marsden, 24 January 1804 – 24 June 1807
- William Wellesley Pole, 24 June 1807 – 12 October 1809
- John Wilson Croker, 12 October 1809 – 2 May 1827

Notes: The Board of Admiralty commission ceased and came under the control of the Lord High Admirals Council from 1827 to 1828.

- George Elliot, 1828–1834
- George Robert Dawson, 1834–1835
- Charles Wood, 1835–1839
- Richard More O'Ferrall, 1839–1841
- John Parker, 1841
- Sidney Herbert, 1841–1845
- Henry Lowry-Corry, 1845–1846
- Henry George Ward, 1846–1849
- John Parker, 1849–1852
- Augustus Stafford, 1852
- Ralph Bernal Osborne, 1853–1858
- Henry Lowry-Corry, 1858–1859
- Lord Clarence Paget, 1859–1866
- Thomas Baring, 1866
- Lord Henry Lennox, 1866–1868
- William Edward Baxter, 1868–1871

=== Parliamentary Secretaries to the Admiralty ===
- George Shaw-Lefevre, 1871–1874
- Algernon Egerton, 1874–1880
- George Shaw-Lefevre, 1880
- George Trevelyan, 1880–1882
- Henry Campbell-Bannerman, 1882–1884
- Thomas Brassey, 1884–1885
- Charles Ritchie, 1885–1886

=== Parliamentary and Financial Secretaries to the Admiralty ===
- J. T. Hibbert 1886
- Arthur Forwood 1886–1892
- Sir Ughtred Kay-Shuttleworth, 2nd Baronet, 1892–1895
- William Ellison-Macartney 1895–1900
- H. O. Arnold-Forster 1900–1903
- E. G. Pretyman 1903–1905
- Edmund Robertson 1905–1908
- Thomas Macnamara 1908–1920
- Sir James Craig, 1st Baronet 1920–1921
- Leo Amery 1921–1922
- Bolton Eyres-Monsell 1922–1923
- Archibald Boyd-Carpenter 1923–1924
- Charles Ammon 1924
- J. C. C. Davidson 1924–1926
- Cuthbert Headlam 1926–1929
- Charles Ammon 1929–1931
- James Stanhope, 7th Earl Stanhope 1931
- Edward Stanley, Lord Stanley 1931–1935
- Sir Victor Warrender, 8th Baronet 1935
- Edward Stanley, Lord Stanley 1935–1937
- Geoffrey Shakespeare 1937–1940
- Sir Victor Warrender, 8th Baronet 1940–1945
- John Dugdale 1945–1950
- James Callaghan 1950–1951
- Allan Noble 1951–1955
- George Ward 1955–1957
- Christopher Soames 1957–1958
- Robert Allan 1958–1959
- Charles Ian Orr-Ewing 1959

office abolished on 16 October 1959

== Departments under the office ==
- Department of the Accountant-General of the Navy
- Department of the Director of Contracts
- Contracts and Purchase Department

== See also ==
- Permanent Secretary of the Admiralty
- First Lord of the Admiralty
- Board of Admiralty
- British Admiralty

== General and cited sources ==
- Haydn, Joseph; Ockerby, Horace (1890). The Book of Dignities; containing Lists of the Official Personages of the British Empire, Civil, Diplomatic, Heraldic, Judicial, Ecclesiastical, Municipal, Naval, and Military, From the Earliest Periods to the Present Time. London: W. H. Allen & Co. pp. 186–187.
- Rodger, N.A.M. (1979). The Admiralty. Lavenham: Terence Dalton Ltd, Suffolk, England, ISBN 0900963948.
