= Richard Benge =

English politician

Richard Benge (died 1409/10) was an English politician. He sat as MP for Sandwich in January 1397 and Mayor of Sandwich from 1407 till 1408.

He also served as jurat of Sandwich between December 1385 till 1386, 1398 till 1399, 1400 till 1403, 1404 till 1405.

Before September 1399, he married Agnes, the sister of Constance who was the widow of John Gyllyng.
