= Charles Capper (politician) =

British politician

Charles Capper (1822 – 21 March 1869) was a British Conservative Party politician. He was a member of parliament (MP) from 1866 to 1868.

He contested the borough of Sandwich at the 1865 general election, but was unsuccessful. However, he won the seat at a by-election in May 1866 after the resignation of the Liberal MP Lord Clarence Paget. He held the seat until 1868, and did not stand again at the 1868 general election.

Parliament of the United Kingdom
Preceded by Lord Clarence Paget; Edward Knatchbull-Hugessen	Member of Parliament for Sandwich; 1866 – 1868; With: Edward Knatchbull-Hugessen	Succeeded by Henry Brassey; Edward Knatchbull-Hugessen
