= Charles Grenfell (1823–1861) =

British Liberal Party politician

Charles William Grenfell (17 March 1823 – 4 May 1861) was a British Liberal Party politician.

== Background ==
Grenfell was the eldest son of Charles Grenfell and grandson of Pascoe Grenfell. His mother was Lady Georgiana Frances, daughter of William Molyneux, 2nd Earl of Sefton, while Henry Grenfell was his younger brother. His mother died when he was three years old.

== Political career ==
Grenfell entered Parliament for Sandwich in 1847, a seat he held until 1852. He later represented Windsor between 1852 and 1859.

== Family ==
Grenfell married Georgiana Caroline, daughter of William Lascelles, in 1852. They had three sons and two daughters. His eldest son William Grenfell was also a politician and was raised to the peerage as Baron Desborough in 1905. The family lived at Taplow Court, Taplow, Buckinghamshire. Grenfell died in May 1861, aged 38. Georgiana remained a widow until her death in February 1911.

Parliament of the United Kingdom
Preceded by Sir Edward Troubridge, Bt; Hugh Hamilton Lindsay	Member of Parliament for Sandwich; 1847–1852; With: Lord Clarence Paget	Succeeded by Lord Clarence Paget; Lord Charles Pelham-Clinton
Preceded by George Alexander Reid; John Hatchell	Member of Parliament for Windsor; 1852–1859; With: John Hatchell 1852; Lord Charles Wellesley 1852–1855; Samson Ricardo 1855–1857; William Vansittart 1857–1859	Succeeded by William Vansittart; George William Hope
