= Edward Knatchbull-Hugessen, 1st Baron Brabourne =

British Liberal and later Conservative politician

The Right Honourable The Lord Brabourne PC
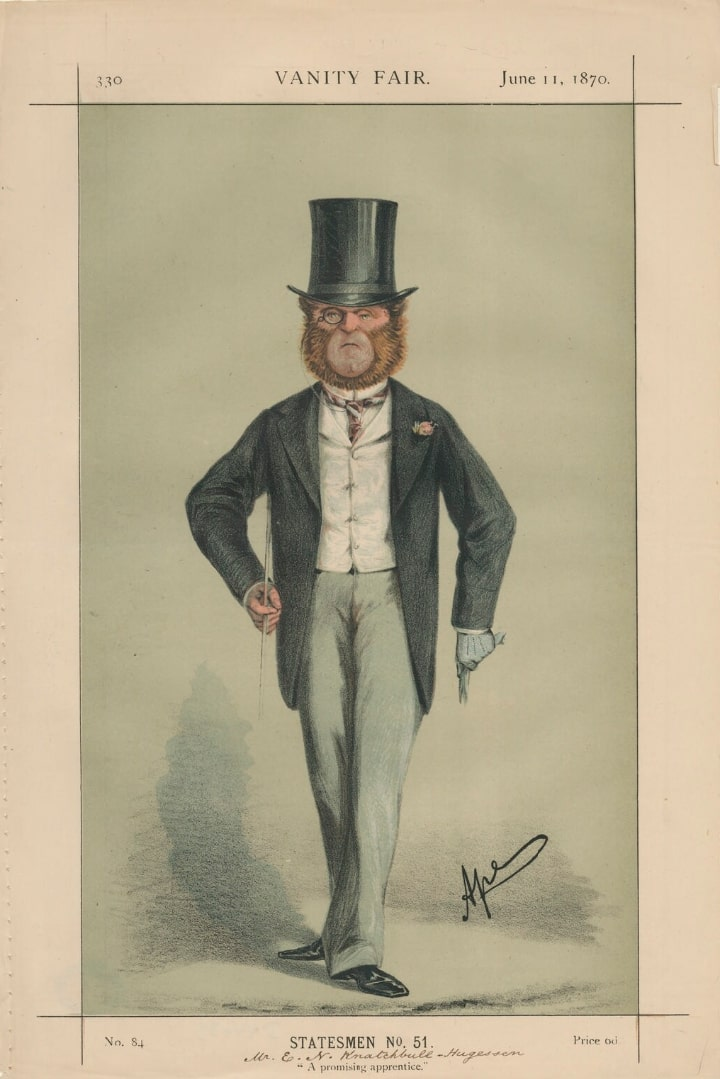
- "A promising apprentice". Knatchbull-Hugessen M.P. as caricatured by Ape (Carlo Pellegrini) in Vanity Fair, June 1870.

Under-Secretary of State for the Home Department
- In office 25 May 1866 – 26 June 1866
- Monarch: Victoria
- Prime Minister: The Earl Russell
- Preceded by: Thomas Baring
- Succeeded by: The Earl Belmore
- In office 10 December 1868 – 11 January 1871
- Monarch: Victoria
- Prime Minister: William Ewart Gladstone
- Preceded by: Sir Michael Hicks-Beach, Bt
- Succeeded by: George Shaw-Lefevre

Under-Secretary of State for the Colonies
- In office 14 January 1871 – 17 February 1874
- Monarch: Victoria
- Prime Minister: William Ewart Gladstone
- Preceded by: William Monsell
- Succeeded by: James Lowther

Personal details
- Born: 29 April 1829
- Died: 6 February 1893 (aged 63)
- Party: Liberal (to 1880), Conservative (after 1880)
- Spouse(s): (1) Anna Maria Elizabeth Southwell (d. 1889) (2) Ethel Mary Walker
- Education: Magdalen College, Oxford

Edward Hugessen Knatchbull-Hugessen, 1st Baron Brabourne PC (29 April 1829 – 6 February 1893), known as E. H. Knatchbull-Hugessen, was a British Liberal and later Conservative politician. He served as Under-Secretary of State for the Home Department under Lord Russell in 1866 and under William Ewart Gladstone from 1868 to 1871 and was also Under-Secretary of State for the Colonies under Gladstone from 1871 to 1874. In 1880 he was elevated to the peerage as Baron Brabourne.

== Background and education ==
Born Edward Hugessen Knatchbull, he was the younger son of Sir Edward Knatchbull, 9th Baronet, who twice served as Paymaster General, and his second wife Fanny Catherine Knight, who was a niece of author Jane Austen. In 1849 he assumed by Royal licence the additional surname of Hugessen, which was the maiden surname of his father's mother. Knatchbull-Hugessen was educated at Eton and Magdalen College, Oxford, where he was President of the Oxford Union. During his Oxford days, he was a strong proponent of agricultural protection, and as President of the Oxford Union in 1850 he helped to instigate the famous three-night-long debate on the motion: ‘That the state of the nation imperatively requires a return to Protection’. The motion was supported by Robert Cecil, the future Prime Minister, and Knatchbull-Hugessen concluded the proposition arguments on 28 February 1850, declaring that:

'From one end of the country to the other, Protection is becoming the glorious watchword of thousands of true Englishmen. To check the tide of revolutionary agitation – to prefer your own countrymen to foreigners – to ameliorate, to vindicate – is not this a high, a national cause?'

The motion passed by 102 votes to 31.

He owned 4,000 acres in Kent.

== Political career ==
In 1857 Knatchbull-Hugessen was elected Member of Parliament for Sandwich, a seat he would hold until 1880. He served as a Lord of the Treasury under Lord Palmerston from 1859 to 1860, as Under-Secretary of State for Home Affairs under Lord Russell in 1866 and under Gladstone from 1868 to 1871 and as Under-Secretary of State for the Colonies under Gladstone from 1871 to 1874. He was admitted to the Privy Council in 1873 and raised to the peerage as Baron Brabourne, of Brabourne in the County of Kent, in 1880. Shortly after becoming a peer he joined the Conservative party, citing his opposition to the interventionist policies of Radicals like Joseph Chamberlain. In 1882 he became a founding member of the Liberty and Property Defence League.

== Literary work ==
Though forgotten and unread today, Knatchbull-Hugessen wrote many well-known short stories of fantasy and faery. He produced a book or two of these stories each year from 1869 to 1894. Some sources on his life, such as Encyclopaedia of Fantasy say 12 such books. Others, such as Oxford Reference, say 15. The collections were popular and commercial successes in the Christmas book market, and his publishers illustrated them with the leading illustrators of their time such as Gustav Doré and Richard Doyle. Far from being the blandly moralistic fare of the later Victorian period, The Times newspaper noted that his stories... "are of a very high order; light and brilliant narrative flow from his pen, and is fed by an invention as graceful as it is inexhaustible." He was widely likened by the reviewers to masters of the fairy-tale such as Grimm and Andersen, and his prolific output of the tales even led a critic at The British Quarterly Review to question his dedication to his job at the Colonial Office... "We should like to know whether Mr. Knatchbull-Hugessen maintains his intercourse with the fairies of the Colonial Office. If so, what department of office duty is specially favourable to them; whether, too, they come when Parliament breaks up, or whether their visits are intermittent all the year round."

In a letter of 1971, J. R. R. Tolkien recalled that, as a small child, his bedtime reading was the fairy stories of Knatchbull-Hugessen. He especially recalled being read one story about an ogre who catches his dinner by disguising himself as a tree.

Brabourne also edited the first edition of the novelist Jane Austen's letters, published in 1884. This edition included about two-thirds of her surviving letters and was dedicated to Queen Victoria. He inherited the letters after his mother's death in December 1882.

== Death ==
He died on 6 February 1893 at Smeeth Paddocks and was buried in St Mary the Virgin Churchyard at Smeeth, Kent, on 9 February.

== Family ==
He was twice married: first, on 19 October 1852, at St. Stephen's, Hertfordshire, to Anna Maria Elizabeth, younger daughter of the Rev. Marcus Richard Southwell, vicar of that church, by whom he had two sons and two daughters:

- Katharine Cecilia Knatchbull-Hugessen (died 21 March 1926).
- Eva Mary Knatchbull-Hugessen (d. 23 October 1895).
- Edward Knatchbull-Hugessen, 2nd Baron Brabourne (5 April 1857 – 29 December 1909).
- Cecil Marcus Knatchbull-Hugessen, 4th Baron Brabourne (27 November 1863 – 15 February 1933).

Lady Brabourne died on 2 May 1889, and on 3 June 1890 Lord Brabourne remarried Ethel Mary Walker, daughter of Colonel Sir George Gustavus Walker. They had two children:

- Adrian Norton Knatchbull-Hugessen (5 July 1891 – 30 March 1976).
- Alicia Mary Dorothea Knatchbull-Hugessen (18 February 1893 – 15 January 1974).

Lord Brabourne was succeeded by his eldest son from his first marriage, Edward.

Parliament of the United Kingdom
Preceded by Lord Charles Pelham-Clinton; James Macgregor	Member of Parliament for Sandwich; 1857–1880; With: Lord Clarence Paget 1857–1866; Charles Capper 1866–1868; Henry Brassey 1868–1880	Succeeded by Henry Brassey; Charles Henry Crompton-Roberts
Political offices
Preceded by Thomas Baring	Under-Secretary of State for the Home Department; May–June 1866	Succeeded by The Earl Belmore
Preceded by Sir Michael Hicks-Beach, Bt	Under-Secretary of State for the Home Department; 1868–1871	Succeeded by George Shaw-Lefevre
Preceded by William Monsell	Under-Secretary of State for the Colonies; 1871–1874	Succeeded by James Lowther
Peerage of the United Kingdom
New creation	Baron Brabourne; 1880–1893	Succeeded by Edward Knatchbull-Hugessen
