= Lord Charles Clinton =

British Conservative politician

Lord Charles Pelham Pelham-Clinton (3 December 1813 – 15 December 1894), known as Lord Charles Clinton, was a British Conservative politician.

== Background ==
Clinton was a younger son of Henry Pelham-Clinton, 4th Duke of Newcastle, and Georgiana Elizabeth, daughter of Edward Miller-Mundy. Henry Pelham-Clinton, 5th Duke of Newcastle was his elder brother and Lord Robert Pelham-Clinton his younger brother.

== Political career ==
Clinton sat as Member of Parliament for Sandwich between 1852 and 1857.

== Family ==
Clinton married Elizabeth, daughter of William Grant, in 1848. They had seven children, six of who survived into adulthood. He died in December 1894, aged 81. His wife survived him by five years and died in November 1899.

Parliament of the United Kingdom
Preceded by Lord Clarence Paget; Charles William Grenfell	Member of Parliament for Sandwich; 1852–1857; With: Lord Clarence Paget 1852; James Macgregor 1852–1857	Succeeded by Edward Knatchbull-Hugessen; Lord Clarence Paget
