= Nathaniel Finch =

English lawyer and politician

Nathaniel Finch (died 1649) was an English lawyer and politician who sat in the House of Commons in 1640.

Finch was related to John Finch, 1st Baron Finch of Fordwich, and bore the same arms as the Finch family of Eastwell. He attended Gray's Inn and became a successful London barrister. He was the king's sergeant-at-law and sergeant to Queen Henrietta Maria.

In April 1640, Finch was elected Member of Parliament for Sandwich in the Short Parliament. Finch's election was thanks to the support of the Lord Keeper as the mayor and jurats had limited the candidates to those supported by the court. This caused a near riot among the freemen.

In about 1642 Finch acquired the manor of Esture in the parish of Chilham, Kent.

Finch died in 1649 and was buried in St Dunstan in the West on 18 May 1649. He was succeeded in his estate at Esture by Baron Finch who died in possession of it in 1661.

Finch married Elizabeth Fotherby daughter of Sir John Fotherby of Barham Kent. After Finch's death, his widow married Sir John Boys.

Parliament of England
Vacant Parliament suspended since 1629	Member of Parliament for Sandwich; 1640; With: Sir John Manwood	Succeeded by Sir Thomas Peyton, 2nd Baronet; Sir Edward Partridge
