= John Masters (disambiguation) =

John Masters was a writer.

John Masters may also refer to:

- John H. Masters (1913–1987), United States Marine Corps general
- Jack Masters (John Masters, born 1931), Canadian politician

== See also ==
- John Master (disambiguation)
