= Mayor of Sandwich =

List of mayors of Sandwich, Kent, England

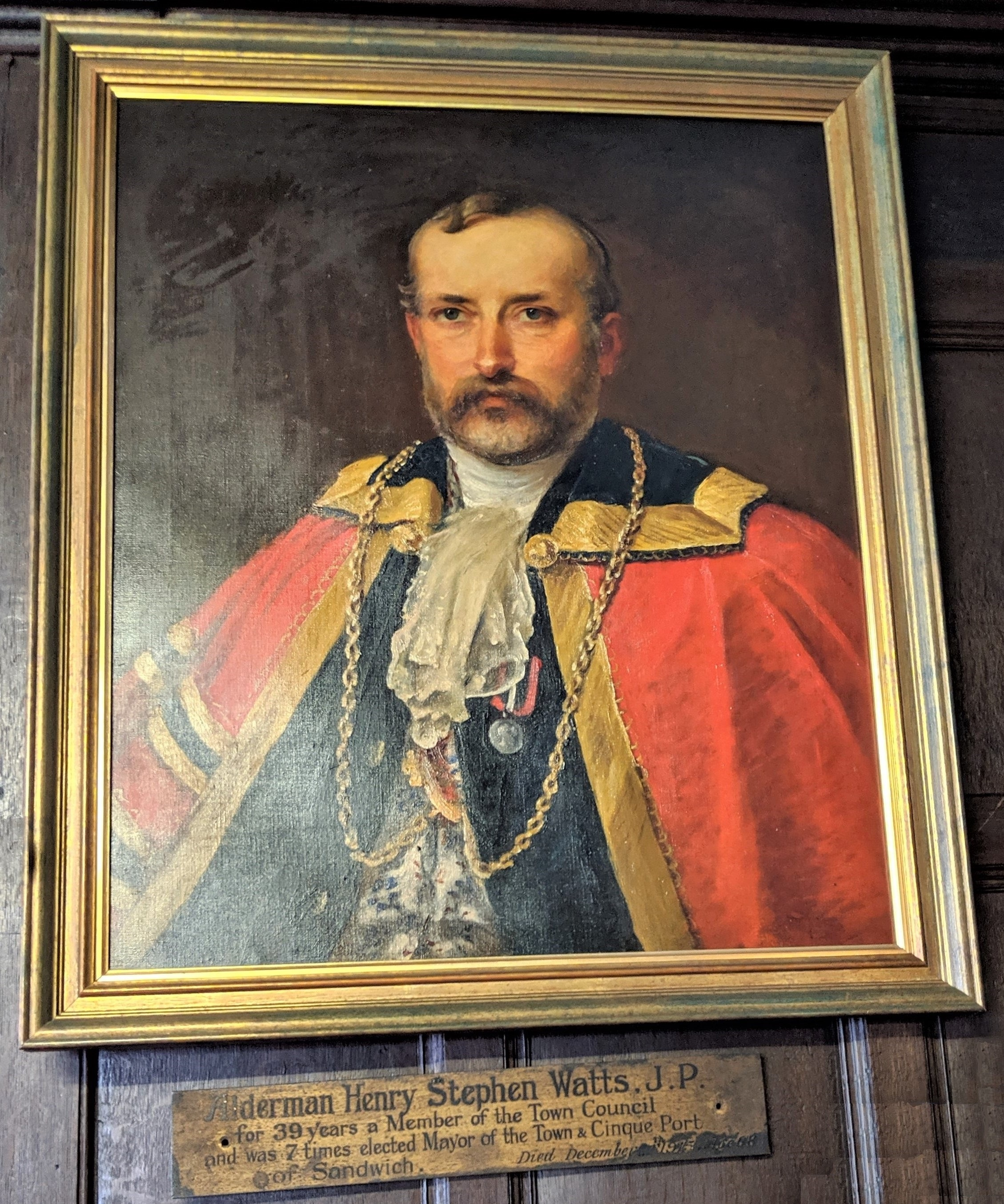
Henry Watts, mayor in 1902

The mayoralty of Sandwich is an ancient office dating back to at least 1214. Many of the mayors are listed on the Mayors' Board in the Guildhall.

== List of mayors ==
The following were mayors of Sandwich, Kent, England:

- 1214: Augar or Algar
- Before 1227: Helyas de Kingston and Peter the Baker
- 1348–1349: William Ive
- 1376–78: William Ive
- 1457 John Drury, who was killed in a French attack on the town, and in whose memory the mayor wears a black robe
- 1474: John Cole
- 1527-8, 1543-4, 1552-3, 1557-1558: John Master (MP)
- 1555: John Stile
- 1555–6, 1559–60: John Manwood
- 1665–66: James Thurbarne
- 1701-3: John Jarvis
- 1710: Richard Solly 1710, 1718, 1728, 1736, 1749
- 1902: Henry Watts (and six other terms)
- 1998: Jeff Franklin
- 2012: Jeremy Watts
- 2012: Paul Graeme
- 2022-3: Jeff Franklin
- 2023-4: Paul Carter
- 2024-5: Paul Carter
