= Eva Knatchbull-Hugessen =

English children's writer, diarist, and social activist

The Hon. Eva Mary Knatchbull-Hugessen (1861–1895) was an English children's writer, diarist, and social activist.

== Life ==
Eva Knatchbull-Hugessen was the second daughter of the politician and writer Edward Knatchbull-Hugessen, 1st Baron Brabourne and his first wife Anna Maria Elizabeth Southwell. Her younger brothers Edward and Cecil later succeeded as Baron Brabourne. Eva's diaries, written between 1873 and 1893, survive and are held at Kent History and Library Centre. Read alongside her father's diaries, they allow a reconstruction of affective dynamics in an upper-class Victorian family, and show her reaction to different aspects of her father's masculinity.

She was an early student at Newnham College, Cambridge, studying there from 1883 to 1886 and taking Part I of the Classical Tripos. She became a committee member of the Newnham College Club, and an active participant in student magazine culture. She later wrote about Newnham College for The Nineteenth Century, and contributed children's stories to Friendly Leaves, Little Wide Awake, The Monthly Packet and Goodwill.

Eva Knatchbull-Hugessen was active in the Women's University Settlement in Southwark, helping to organize an annual loan exhibition of pictures at the recently founded Borough Polytechnic. According to her obituarist in The Times, "the hard work involved in these activities proved too much for Miss Hugesson's delicate health". She died at Lucerne on 23 October 1895.

== Works ==
- 'Newnham College from Within', Nineteenth Century, Vol. 21, No. 6 (1887)
- The night-hawks. London & Edinburgh: W. & R. Chambers, 1890.
- A hit and a miss. London: A.D. Innes, 1893.
- The satellite and other stories. London: A.D. Innes, 1894.
