= John Godard (fl. 1377–1402) =

Member of the Parliament of England

John Godard (fl. 1377–1402) in Sandwich, Kent served as an English Member of Parliament for Sandwich in the parliaments of January 1377, 1386, 1395, January 1397, 1399 and 1402.
