= John Berham =

English politician

John Berham (fl. 1373–1395) was an English politician. He sat as MP for Sandwich in October 1382, September 1388, and January 1390.

He also served as jurat of Sandwich from December 1381 till 1384, 1386 till 1387, 1388 till 1389, and 1390 till 1392.
