= John Nessche =

English politician

John atte Nessche (fl. 1383–1413) was an English politician. He sat as MP for Sandwich in 1395 and 1402.

He also served as jurat of Sandwich from December 1385 till 1386, 1389 till 1399, 1401 till 1402, and 1403 till 1410 and as commissioner to assemble ships to combat pirates in Sandwich in May 1398.
