= Josiah Burchett =

British naval administrator and Whig politician

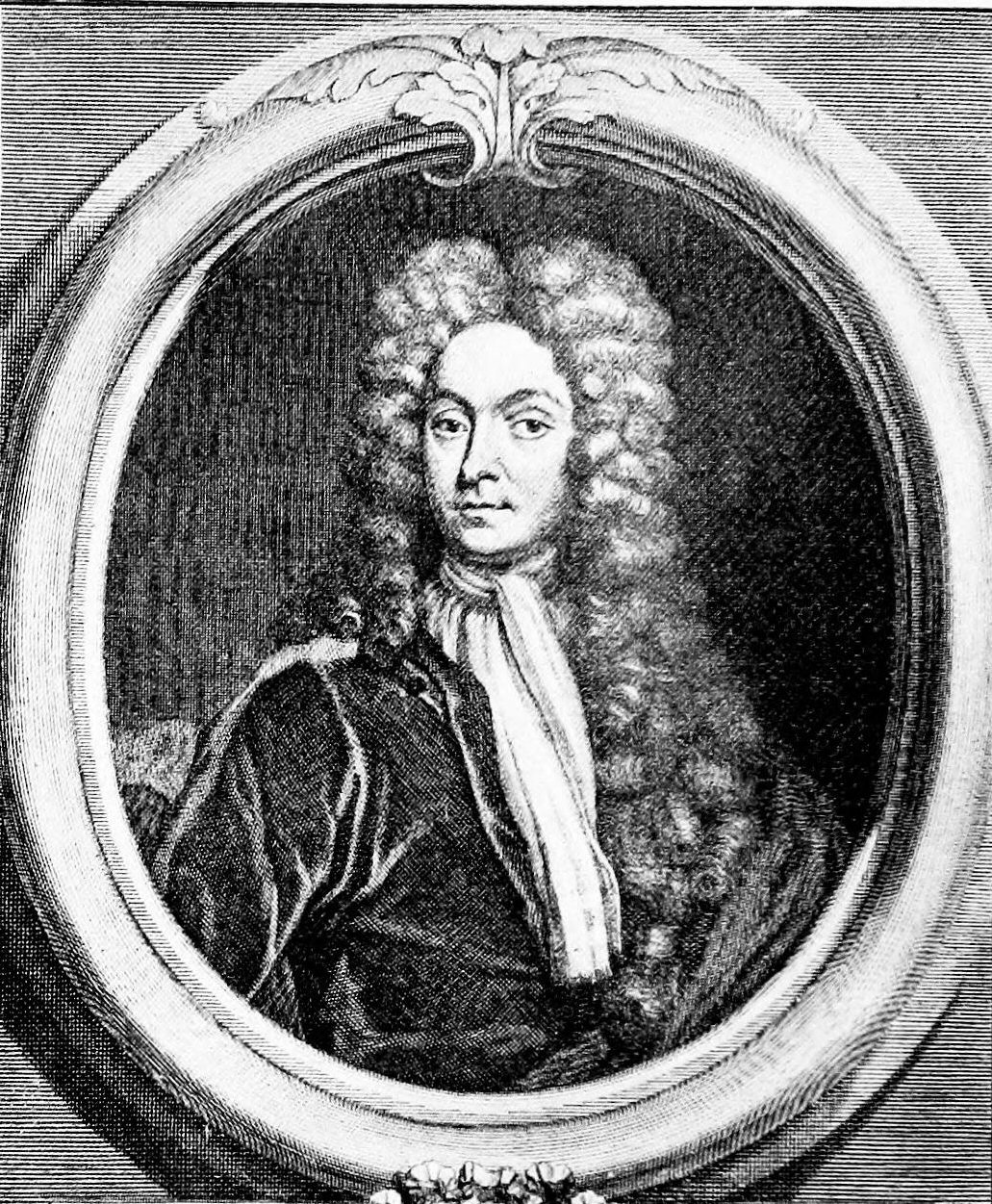
Josiah Burchett

Josiah Burchett (c.1665 – 2 October 1746), of Hampstead, Middlesex, was a British naval administrator and Whig politician, who sat in the English and British House of Commons between 1705 and 1741. He was Secretary of the Admiralty in England, a position he held for almost fifty years from 26 September 1694 to 14 October 1742. In addition to his administrative duties, he was the author of the first general history of the Royal Navy, published in 1720 and based on official Admiralty records.

== Early life ==
Burchett was probably the eldest surviving son of John Burchett of Sandwich and his second wife Katherine. He married on 24 December 1695, Thomasine Honywood, daughter of Sir William Honywood, 2nd Baronet.

== Career ==
Burchett was clerk to Samuel Pepys, the English civil servant famous for his diary from about 1680. He fell out of favour with Pepys in about August 1687, but gained the respect and favour of Lord Admiral Edward Russell, and in June 1691 he was appointed Russell's secretary. In this role he alternated between active service when Russell was at sea and employment at the Admiralty Board. In September 1694 he was appointed Secretary of the Admiralty and served continuously until he retired at age 76.

Burchett served on Russell's flagship, the 100-gun HMS Britannia, at the battle of Barfleur in 1692 during the War of the Grand Alliance. In 1693 he became the Deputy Judge Advocate of the Fleet, replacing Samuel Pepys in that office.

Burchett was returned as a Whig Member of Parliament for Sandwich and as a member of the 'Court Group' at the 1705 English general election. He remained MP until the 1713 British general election. He was then returned in 1721 continuing as a member for 20 years.

Using official reports received by the Admiralty, Burchett wrote the Memoirs of Transactions at Sea during the War with France, which was published in 1703 by the Queen's Printer, Edward Jones. In 1720 he published the lengthy book A Complete History of the Most Remarkable Transactions at Sea, which was reissued in 1995 by John Hattendorf of the U.S. Naval War College. This 1720 book was the first general naval history published in the English language. This book was published by the printing firm J. Walthoe under royal licence of King George I of Great Britain and was clearly based on the official reports received in the Admiralty. Burchett's A Complete History of the Most Remarkable Transactions at Sea, along with Thomas Lediard's 1735 The Naval History of England, has become a key source of naval history of that era.

Burchett's first wife died in 1713, leaving him with a son and one surviving daughter and a property at Hampstead. He married secondly on 22 July 1721, Margaret Arris, widow of Captain Robert Arris. Following her death in 1740, he married on 10 June 1740, his third wife Isabella Wood, widow of Mr. Wood, and daughter of John Robinson, MP.

== Later life and legacy ==
Following his retirement with a pension of £800 p.a. Burchett spent his last years at Hampstead, where he died on 2 October 1746. His widow, who died in 1756, received a pension of £100 p.a.

Since he held the office of Secretary of the Admiralty, the key administrator of the Royal Navy, longer than any other person and had extensive official correspondence and Admiralty papers that have been preserved, his books and writings are relied upon by maritime and naval war historians. Unlike his predecessor Samuel Pepys, Burchett left no known diary or private papers. He died at age 80 at Hampstead near London.

Most of his savings were spent on a collection of about 312 paintings. The "Entire and Genuine Collection of Pictures of Josiah Burchett, Esquire" was auctioned by Christopher Cock from his house in the Great Piazza, Covent Garden on 6–9 April 1747. The sale included works by Kneller, Leonardo da Vinci, Raphael, Rembrandt and Rubens.

== Works ==
- Burchett, Josiah, A Complete History of the Most Remarkable Transactions at Sea, 1720, London: J. Walthoe. Original edition available at archive.org. Facsimile edition: 1995, Scholars' Facsimiles & Reprints, ISBN 978-0-8201-1489-7.

Parliament of England
Preceded by John Michel; Sir Henry Furnese	Member of Parliament for Sandwich; 1705–1707; With: Sir Henry Furnese	Parliament of England abolished
Parliament of Great Britain
New creation Parliament of Great Britain created	Member of Parliament for Sandwich; 1707–1713; With: Sir Henry Furnese to April 1713; John Michel from April 1713	Succeeded by John Michel; Sir Henry Oxenden
Preceded by Sir Thomas D'Aeth; Sir George Oxenden	Member of Parliament for Sandwich; 1722–1741; With: Sir George Oxenden	Succeeded by John Pratt; Sir George Oxenden
