= Furnese baronets =

Extinct baronetcy

Escutcheon of the Furnese baronets of Waldershare

The Furnese baronetcy, of Waldershare in the County of Kent, was a title in the Baronetage of Great Britain. It was created on 27 June 1707 for Henry Furnese, a financier and Member of Parliament for Bramber and Sandwich. The 2nd Baronet was Member of Parliament for Truro, New Romney and Kent.

The title became extinct on the death of the 3rd Baronet in March 1735.

== Furnese baronets, of Waldershare (1707) ==
- Sir Henry Furnese, 1st Baronet (c. 1658 – 1712)
- Sir Robert Furnese, 2nd Baronet (1687–1733)
- Sir Henry Furnese, 3rd Baronet (c. 1716 – 1735)

Baronetage of Great Britain
| Preceded by Baronetage of England; Baronetage of Nova Scotia | Furnese baronets of Waldershare; 27 June 1707 | Succeeded by Dashwood baronets |
