= Sir Henry Oxenden, 1st Baronet =

English politician

Sir Henry Oxenden, 1st Baronet (1614–1686) was an English politician who sat in the House of Commons at various times between 1645 and 1660.

Oxenden was the eldest son of Sir James Oxenden of Deane and his wife Margaret Nevinson, daughter of Thomas Nevinson of Eastry, Kent. He was knighted on 11 July 1660, despite his family's rather dubious record of loyalty to the Crown.

Oxenden was elected Member of Parliament for Winchelsea as a recruiter to the Long Parliament in 1645. He was elected MP for Kent in the First Protectorate Parliament of 1654 and in the Second Protectorate Parliament in 1656. In 1660 he was elected MP for Sandwich in the Convention Parliament. He was created Baronet in on 6 May 1678. During the Exclusion Crisis he was generally regarded as an opponent of the Crown.

Oxenden married firstly Mary Baker daughter of Robert Baker of St Martin in the Fields, by whom he had a daughter, and secondly, Elizabeth Meredith (died 1659) daughter of Sir William Meredith, 1st Baronet of Leeds Abbey, Kent and his first wife Susannah Barker. Her portrait was painted by Sir Peter Lely. They had issue James and Henry who successively succeeded to the baronetcy, and George, and several daughters including Susannah, who married Sir Robert Booth, Lord Chief Justice of Ireland, by whom she had four daughters. He married thirdly Elizabeth Reade, daughter of Matthew Reade of Folkestone, and widow of Mark Dixwell.

Baronetage of England
New creation	Baronet (of Dene); 1678–1686	Succeeded by James Oxenden
