= John Leveson =

English politician

Sir John Leveson
- Born: 21 March 1555; Cuxton, Kent, England
- Died: 14 November 1615 (aged 60); Cuxton, Kent, England
- Buried: Cuxton, Kent
- Spouses: Margaret Manwood; Christian Mildmay
- Issue: Sir John Leveson; Richard Leveson; Francis Leveson two other sons Rachel Leveson seven other daughters
- Father: Thomas Leveson
- Mother: Ursula Gresham

Sir John Leveson (21 March 1555 – 14 November 1615) was an English politician. He was instrumental in putting down Essex's Rebellion on 8 February 1601.

== Family ==
John Leveson, born 21 March 1555 at Whornes Place, Cuxton, Kent, was the eldest son of Thomas Leveson (1532–1576), second son of the London mercer Nicholas Leveson (d.1539) by Denise or Dionyse Bodley (d.1561), youngest daughter of Thomas Bodley (d.1493) and Joan Leche (d. March 1530). His mother was Ursula Gresham (1534–1574), one of the twelve children of Sir John Gresham, Lord Mayor of London.

Leveson had a younger brother, William Leveson (d.1621), one of two trustees used by William Kempe, Thomas Pope (d.1603), Augustine Phillips (d.1605), John Heminges (bap. 1566, d. 1630) and William Shakespeare (1564-1616) to allocate shareholdings in the Globe Theatre in 1599.

== Career ==
Leveson matriculated at Queen's College, Oxford, on 10 January 1576, and studied for a time at Gray's Inn.

According to Wisker, Leveson was an efficient estate manager and 'an excellent public servant'. He was a close associate in Kent of William Brooke, 10th Baron Cobham, and eventually one of the executors of his will. He was also a captain in Peregrine Bertie, 13th Baron Willoughby de Eresby's 1589 expedition to France. He was knighted in 1589, and helped raise volunteers for three of Sir John Norris's expeditions in 1589, 1596 and 1601. He was a cousin of Sir Richard Leveson, and with him was involved in the shipment of 2000 soldiers sent to Ireland in 1601.

While riding to his house at the Blackfriars, London, on 8 February 1601 Leveson inadvertently became instrumental in suppressing the rebellion of Robert Devereux, 2nd Earl of Essex, taking command of a force on Ludgate Hill and placing a barrier across the street. Within half an hour Essex's men tried to force their way through, and in the resulting skirmish Essex's stepfather, Sir Christopher Blount was injured, whereupon Essex withdrew with his men to Essex House.

Leveson was a Member of Parliament for Bossiney in 1586, Maidstone in 1597 and 1601, and for Kent in 1604.

He died at Whornes Place on 14 November 1615, and was buried in the parish church at Cuxton on 22 November.

== Marriages and issue ==
Leveson married firstly, on 27 April 1579, Margaret Manwood (d. 26 April 1585), the daughter of Sir Roger Manwood, by whom he had three daughters who died in the lifetime of their father.

Leveson married secondly, on 9 July 1586, Christian Mildmay (d. February 1627), widow of Charles Barrett by whom she was the mother of Edward Barrett, 1st and last Baron Barrett, and daughter of Sir Walter Mildmay, by whom he had five sons, three of whom died within the lifetime of their father, and five daughters, four of whom died within the lifetime of their father.

Among Leveson's children who lived to adulthood were:

- Sir John Leveson (d.1613), who married Frances Sondes (1592–c.1634), the daughter of Thomas Sondes (1544–1593) of Throwley, Kent, by Margaret Brooke (1563–1621), the youngest daughter of William Brooke, 10th Baron Cobham, and died of plague in December 1613, predeceasing his father and leaving two infant daughters, Christian and Frances. After Sir John Leveson's death, Frances married, as his first wife, Thomas Savile (bap. 14 September 1590 – c.1659), later Earl of Sussex. There were no issue of the marriage. After Frances' death, Savile married secondly, shortly after November 1640, Anne Villiers, only daughter of Christopher Villiers, 1st Earl of Anglesey, by Elizabeth Sheldon, the daughter of Thomas Sheldon.
- Christian Leveson, married to Sir Peter Temple, 2nd Baronet by whom she was the mother of Sir Richard Temple, 3rd Baronet.
- Richard Leveson. Richard was made heir to the large but heavily indebted Shropshire and Staffordshire estates of his relative and namesake, Vice-Admiral Richard Leveson, who died in 1605. Sir John was much concerned in his later years, as head of a family trust, with the struggle to rectify the financial position of the Leveson estates. He died with the issue unresolved but his wife, Christian, was able to pay off the debts and secure the inheritance of their second son in 1623. He was a regionally important as royalist in the English Civil War.
- Francis Leveson.
- Rachel Leveson, who married Richard Newport, 1st Baron Newport (7 May 1587 – 8 February 1651), of Eyton and High Ercall, Shropshire.
