= John Master (MP) =

16th-century English politician

John Master (by 1490–1558) was an English merchant and brewer who was also the MP for the constituency of Sandwich in 1545 for two years and again in 1554 for a few months. He also ran unsuccessfully in 1555. Master was also the mayor of Sandwich, Kent.
