= Nicholas Crispe (died 1564) =

English politician

Nicholas Crispe (by 1530–1564), from Whitstable, Kent, was an English politician.

== Family ==
Nicholas Crispe was the eldest son of Sir Henry Crispe and Katherine Scott (buried 9 Feb. 1545), the daughter of Sir John Scott of Scot's Hall in Smeeth, Kent.

== Career ==
Crispe was educated at Gray's Inn, (1544).

He was elected a Member (MP) of the Parliament of England for Sandwich in November 1554 and 1558. he was appointed High Sheriff of Kent for 1559–60 and sat on the bench as a Justice of Peace for the county from 1562 to his death.

== Marriages and issue ==
Crispe married firstly Frances Cheyne, the daughter of Sir Thomas Cheyne of the Blackfriars, London and Shurland, Isle of Sheppey, Kent, and his first wife, Frideswide Frowyk (died c. 1528), the daughter of Sir Thomas Frowyk, Chief Justice of the Common Pleas, by whom he had an only daughter, Dorothy Crispe, who at his death became the ward of Sir Francis Knollys.

Crispe married secondly Mary Glemham, the daughter of Christopher Glemham of Glemham, Suffolk.

Crispe's property was inherited by his daughter Dorothy.
