= Robert Furnese =

English Whig politician

Sir Robert Furnese, 2nd Baronet (1 August 1687 – 7 March 1733), of Waldershare, Kent, and Dover Street, Westminster, was an English Whig politician who sat in the British House of Commons from 1708 to 1733.

== Early life and family ==
Furnese was the son of Sir Henry Furnese, 1st Baronet, and his first wife, Anne Brough, daughter of Robert Brough. He was educated at Eton College in 1697, and spent some time in Germany and Austria as a young man.

== Political career ==
Furnese was abroad at the time of the 1708 British general election, but shortly after his return from the Continent, he was returned unopposed as Whig Member of Parliament for Truro in a by-election on 16 December 1708. He voted for the impeachment of Dr Sacheverell in 1710. There was pressure for Furnese to stand for Thetford at the 1710 British general election, but he was appointed to the Commission of the Peace for Kent and returned in a contest as Whig MP for New Romney. He voted for the "No Peace Without Spain" motion on 7 December 1711.

On the death of his father on 30 November 1712, he succeeded to the baronetcy and a large estate at Waldershare, Kent. He was returned unopposed for New Romney at the 1713 British general election and voted against the expulsion of Richard Steele on 18 March 1714

At the 1715 British general election, Furnese was returned in a contest as a Whig at New Romney on his own interest. He voted for the septennial bill, and in 1717 followed Robert Walpole into opposition. He voted against the Government on Lord Cadogan in June 1717 and opposed the Peerage Bill in 1719. At the 1722 British general election he was returned unopposed for New Romney. At the 1727 British general election, he was returned as MP for Kent while he was defeated at New Romney. After being awarded the New Romney seat on petition, he decided to remain as MP for Kent. From 1729, he voted against the Government.

== Marriages ==
Furnese was married three times. His first wife was his stepsister Anne Balam (1688-29 May 1713), the daughter of his father's second wife Matilda Vernon and her first husband Anthony Balam. They married on 1 October 1708 and had one daughter, Anne, who married the Hon. John St John, son of Henry St John, 1st Viscount St John. Anne, Lady Furnese, died on 29 May 1713 aged 25.

His second marriage on 8 July 1714 was to Arabella Watson, daughter of Lewis Watson, 1st Earl of Rockingham. She was the mother of Furnese's only son Henry and his second daughter Catherine, who married her first cousin Lewis Watson, 2nd Earl of Rockingham. Arabella died on 5 September 1727.

He married thirdly, on 15 May 1729 at Teddington, Middlesex, Lady Anne Shirley, daughter of Robert Shirley, 1st Earl Ferrers. By his last wife, he left a daughter Selina who married Edward Dering. They had one other daughter who predeceased her father.

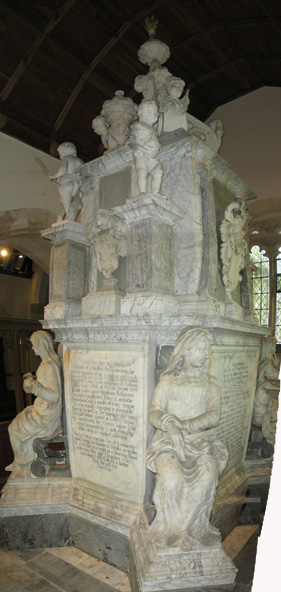
Monument over the Furnese family vault, All Saints' Church, Waldershare

== Death and legacy ==
Furnese died on 7 March 1733 at Waldershare, Kent, and was succeeded by his son Henry. According to a contemporary, he died "by his own fault, for he had one of those colds hanging on him and he drank so hard that he was not sober for ten days before he was taken ill". He was buried at Waldershare on 14 March. His widow survived him by 46 years, dying in Dover Street, London, on 25 February 1779 aged 70. She was buried in Grosvenor Chapel, Westminster.

His only son, Sir Henry Furnese, 3rd Baronet, was born about 1716 and matriculated at Christ Church, Oxford, aged 16 in November 1732. He died unmarried and without issue aged 19 in Montpellier, France, in March 1735. The estate was shared, as co-heirs, by Sir Robert's three surviving daughters: Anne, Catherine (Countess of Rockingham) and Selina. The title became extinct.

Parliament of Great Britain
Preceded by James Brydges; Henry Vincent	Member of Parliament for Truro; 1708–1710; With: Henry Vincent	Succeeded by Hugh Boscawen; Henry Vincent
Preceded by John Brewer; Walter Whitfield	Member of Parliament for New Romney; 1710–1727; With: Walter Whitfield 1710–1713; Edward Watson 1713–1722; David Papillon 1722–1727	Succeeded by John Essington; David Papillon
Preceded by Sir Edward Knatchbull, Bt; Sir Thomas Twisden, Bt	Member of Parliament for Kent; 1727–1733; With: Sir Roger Meredith, Bt	Succeeded by Sir Roger Meredith, Bt; Sir Edward Dering, Bt
Baronetage of Great Britain
Preceded by Henry Furnese	Baronet (of Waldershare); 1712–1733	Succeeded by Henry Furnese
