= John Manwood (died c. 1571) =

Member of the Parliament of England

John Manwood (by 1524 – c. 1571), of Sandwich, Kent was an English Member of Parliament for Sandwich in 1571 and Mayor of Sandwich in 1555–6 and 1559–60.
