= Sir Henry Furnese, 1st Baronet =

English merchant and Whig politician

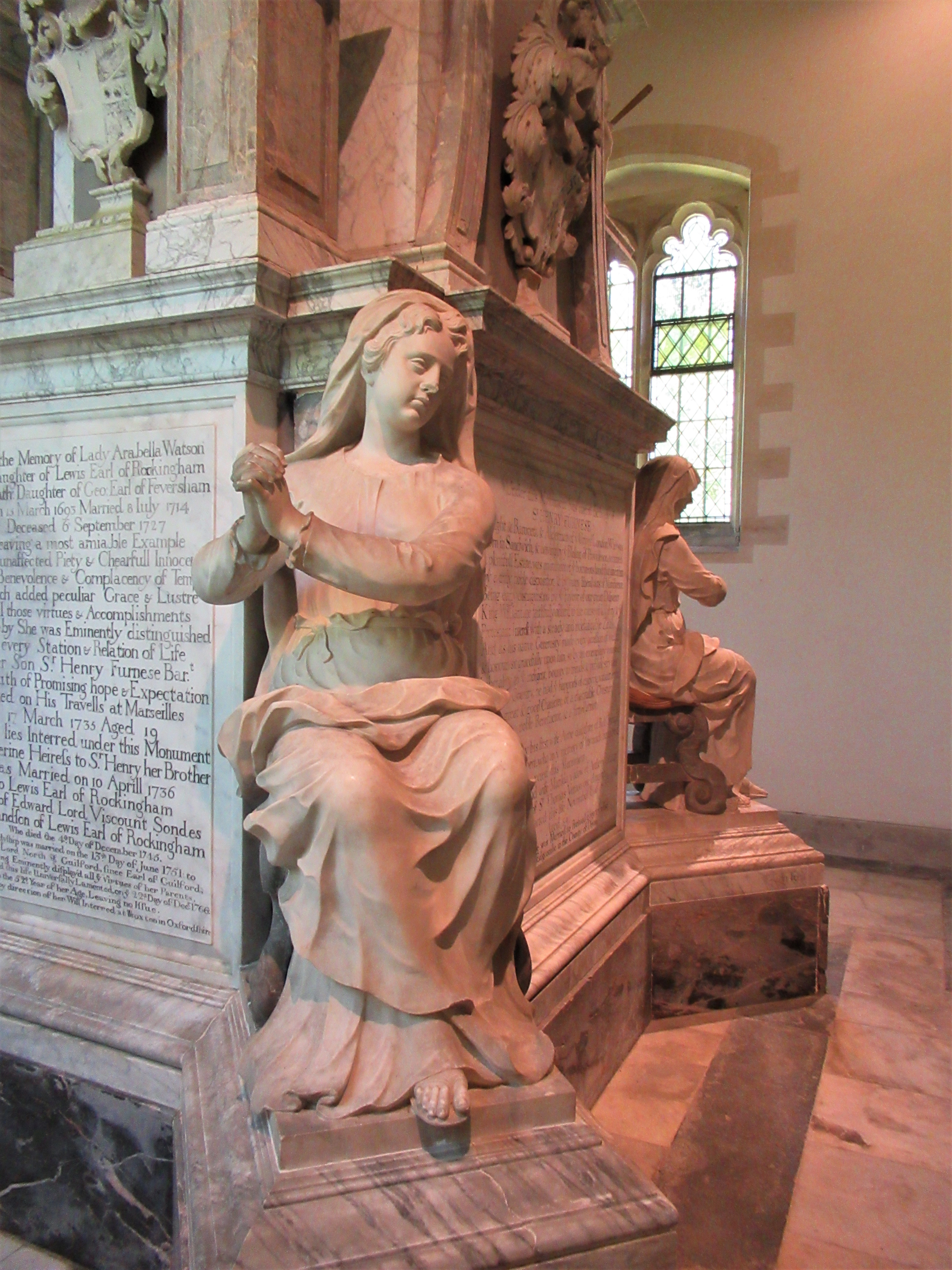
Furness monument, All Saints, Waldershare (detail)

Sir Henry Furnese, 1st Baronet (30 May 1658 – 30 November 1712), of Waldershare, Kent, and Dover Street, Westminster, was an English merchant and Whig politician who sat in the English and British House of Commons between 1698 and 1712.

Furnese was the son of Henry Furnese, of Sandwich, Kent and his wife Anne Gosfright, daughter of Andrew Gosfright of Sandwich. He was an apprentice of the Drapers’ Company in 1672, and pursued a career in the City of London as a merchant trader. He was knighted at The Hague on 21 October 1691. He was master of the Drapers' Company from 1694 to 1695. He was one of the original directors of the Bank of England when the bank was founded in 1694. He served as a member of the Director's Court of the bank from 1694 to 1697, 1699 to 1700 and 1700 to 1702. He was also a director of the New East India Company from 1698 to 1703.

Furnese was elected as Member of Parliament for Bramber at the 1698 English general election, but was expelled on 14 February the following year for holding a post incompatible with being a Member of Parliament. He was re-elected for Sandwich in 1701 but was again expelled the following month, only to be re-elected again, after which he held the seat until his death.

Furnese was Sheriff of London, 1700–01, and was created a baronet on 27 June 1707. In May 1711, he was selected as an Alderman of the City of London, representing Bridge Within.

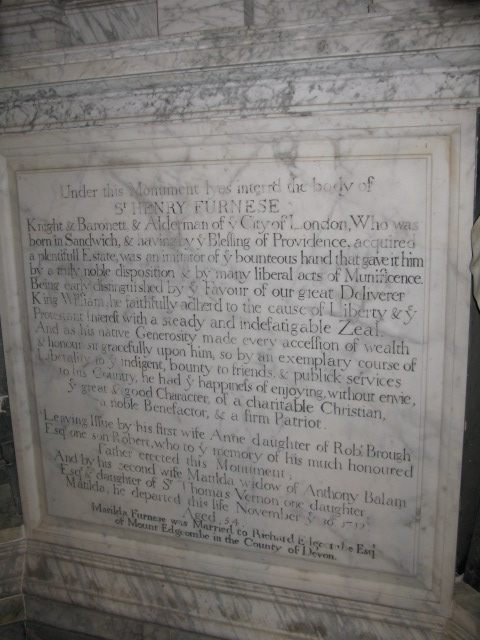
Monument to Furnese, All Saints' Church, Waldershare, Kent

He married twice: firstly in November 1684 to Anne Brough, the 19-year-old daughter of linen draper Robert Brough of St Lawrence Jewry. She was buried in the parish church of St Lawrence Jewry on 30 June 1695. His second marriage was to Matilda, the widow of Anthony Balam and daughter of fellow London merchant Sir Thomas Vernon.

Furnese died on 30 November 1712, aged 54, and was succeeded in the baronetcy by his son Robert. His widow died 20 years later on 8 May 1732.

His tomb in Waldershare church was sculpted by Thomas Green of Camberwell.

== Notes and references ==
Parliament of England
Preceded by Nicholas Barbon; William Stringer	Member of Parliament for Bramber; 1698–1699; With: William Westbrooke	Succeeded by John Courthope; William Westbrooke
Preceded by John Michel; John Thurbarne	Member of Parliament for Sandwich; 1701; With: John Taylor	Succeeded by John Michel; John Taylor
Preceded by John Michel; John Taylor	Member of Parliament for Sandwich; 1701–1707; With: Sir James Oxenden 1701-1702; Josiah Burchett 1705-1707	Succeeded by Parliament of Great Britain
Parliament of Great Britain
Preceded by Parliament of England	Member of Parliament for Sandwich; 1707–1712; With: Josiah Burchett	Succeeded by John Michel; Josiah Burchett
Baronetage of Great Britain
New creation	Baronet (of Waldershare); 1707-1712	Succeeded by Robert Furnese
