= John Manwood =

English barrister

John Manwood (died 1610) was a barrister of Lincoln's Inn, gamekeeper of Waltham Forest, and Justice in Eyre of the New Forest under Elizabeth I of England. He was a close relative, probably a nephew, of Sir Roger Manwood, Lord Chief Baron of the Exchequer in the reign of Elizabeth.

== Writings ==
Manwood's first essay on forest law entitled A Brefe Collection of the Lawes of the Forrest was circulated privately in 1592.

It was revised, enlarged, and published by Thomas Wight and Bonham Norton in 1598 as A Treatise and Discourse of the Lawes of the Forrest. This underwent numerous subsequent editions, most notably in that of 1615 by the Societie of Stationers, a version which included material from the Brefe Collection which was not included in the 1598 version. Manwood's book remained a standard reference on forest law through the mid-1900s.

His Treatise has become perhaps the most-cited secondary source of forest law. As such it is quoted approvingly by Sir William Blackstone in his Commentaries on the Laws of England.

However, although Manwood's work is considered by Blackstone to be authoritative, others have pointed out that Manwood, being himself a royal officer, had an interest in amplifying the institutions he described. It has also been pointed out that these institutions had in his time largely fallen into desuetude, and his descriptions may be partly artificial and fanciful.

Manwood was the great great great grandfather of Sir Nicholas Conyngham Tindal, Chief Justice of the Common Pleas from 1829 to 1843.

== Note ==
He is sometimes confused with his kinsman Sir Roger Manwood (1525–1593).
