= Roger Manwood =

Member of the Parliament of England

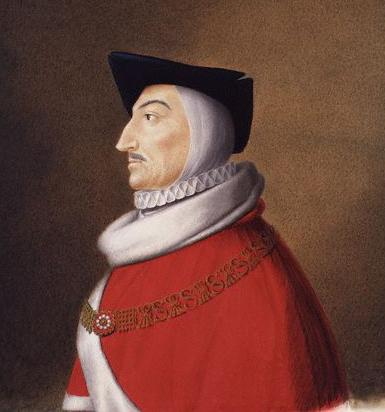
Portrait of Sir Roger Manwood by George Perfect Harding.

Sir Roger Manwood (1525–1592) was an English jurist and Lord Chief Baron of the Exchequer.

== Birth ==
Sir Roger was the second son of Thomas Manwood (d. 1538, draper) and Katherine (d.1566, daughter of John Galloway of Cley, Norfolk). He was born in Sandwich, Kent in 1524/5. Sir Roger lived in Sandwich and then at Hackington near Canterbury.

== Education ==
Roger Manwood was educated at St. Peter's school, Sandwich. In 1548 he was admitted to and began his training as a barrister at the Inner Temple. He was called to the bar in 1555.

== Career ==
In 1555 Roger Manwood was appointed recorder of Sandwich, and became MP for Hastings.

In 1557-8 he exchanged Hastings for Sandwich, which he continued to represent until 1572. He resigned the recordership of Sandwich in 1566, but acted as counsel for the town Sandwich in 1558, 1559, 1563, 1571, 1572 and until his death.

He was reader at the Inner Temple in Lent 1565.

Manwood was also, for some years prior to his elevation to the bench of the common pleas, steward, i.e. judge, of the chancery and admiralty courts of Dover.

Manwood attained the highest and most prestigious order of counsel, namely serjeant-at-law, on 23 April 1567. In Parliament he supported the Treason Bill of 1571, was a member of the joint committee of lords and commons to which the case of Mary, Queen of Scots was referred in May 1572, and concurred in advising her execution. On 14 October he was rewarded with a puisne judgeship of the common pleas. He was one of the original governors of Queen Elizabeth's grammar school, founded at Lewisham in 1574, and in 1575 obtained an act of Parliament providing for the perpetual maintenance of Rochester Bridge, which, however, did not prevent its demolition in 1856, to make way for the present iron structure. Manwood was joined with the bishops of London and Rochester in a commission of 11 May 1575 for the examination of foreign immigrants suspected of anabaptism. The inquisition resulted in the conviction of two Flemings, John Peters and Henry Twiwert, who were burned at West Smithfield. On 23 April 1576 Manwood was placed on the high commission.

By the influence of Walsingham and Hatton, Manwood was created Chief Baron of the Exchequer on 17 November 1578. He was knighted at Richmond two days before and served Queen Elizabeth I until 1592.

He took his seat in the following Hilary term. As lord chief baron Manwood was a member of the court of Star Chamber which on 15 November 1581 passed sentence of fine and imprisonment upon William, Lord Vaux of Harrowden, and other suspected harbourers of the Jesuit Edmund Campion for refusing to be examined about the matter. His judgment, in which he limits the legal maxim, 'Nemo tenetur seipsum prodere (that no person shall be compelled in any criminal case to be a witness against themselves),' to cases involving life or limb, was printed.

In 1582, on the death of Sir James Dyer, chief justice of the common pleas, Manwood offered Burghley a large sum for his place, which, however, was given to Edmund Anderson. In February 1584-5 he helped to try the intended regicide William Parry, and in the following June he took part in the inquest on the death of the Earl of Northumberland in the Tower, He was a member of the special commission which, on 11 October 1586, assembled at Fotheringay for the examination of Mary, Queen of Scots, and concurred in the verdict afterwards found against her in the Star Chamber (25 October) He also sat on the commission which, on 28 March 1587, found Secretary Davison guilty of 'misprison and contempt' for his part in bringing about her execution.

In 1591 he was detected in the sale of one of the offices in his gift, and sharply censured by the queen. A curious letter, in which he attempts to excuse himself by quoting precedents, is extant in Harley MS 6995, f. 49. This was but one of several misfeasances of various degrees of gravity with which Manwood was charged during his later years. Thomas Digges and Richard Barrey, lieutenant of Dover Castle, charged him with deliberate perversion of justice, in the chancery and admiralty courts of Dover, and the exchequer; Sir Thomas Perrot and Thomas Cheyne, with covinous pleading in the court of chancery; and Richard Rogers, suffragan Bishop of Dover, with selling the queen's pardon in a murder case for £240. According to Manninghamc, he even stooped to appropriate a gold chain which a goldsmith had placed in his hands for inspection, and on the privy council intervening by writ at the suit of the goldsmith, returned the scornful answer, 'Malas causas habentes semper fugiunt ad potentes. Ubi non valet Veritas, praevalet auctoritas. Currat lex, vivat Rex, and so fare you well my Lords.' 'But,' adds the diarist, 'he was commit.' This strange story is confirmed by extant letters of Manwood, from which it appears that he was arraigned before the privy council in April 1592, refused to recognise its jurisdiction in a contemptuous letter containing the words 'fugiunt ad potentes,' was thereupon confined in his own house in Great St. Bartholomew's by order of the council, and only regained his liberty by apologising for the obnoxious letter, and making humble submission (14 May). His disgrace, however, did not prevent his offering Burghley five hundred marks for the chief justiceship of the queen's bench, vacant by the death of Sir Christopher Wray. The bribe was not taken, and on 14 December 1592 Manwood died. Other of Manwood's letters are preserved in the British Library, and the 'Manwood Papers' in the Inner Temple Library. His hand is one of the least legible ever written.

== Marriage and family ==
He married firstly, Dorothy Theobald (daughter of John Theobald of Sheppey), widow of John Croke and Christopher Allen, and secondly, Elizabeth Coppinger (daughter of John Copinger, of Allhallows), widow of John Wilkins.

His children with Dorothy Theobald were John and Thomas (who died young), Margaret (the first wife of Sir John Leveson), Anne (the first wife of Percival Hart), and Peter (later Sir Peter Manwood, Knight of the Bath).

== Character and Social life ==
At the Inner Temple revels of Christmas 1561 Manwood played the part of lord chief baron in the masque of 'Palaphilos' [cf. Hatton, Sir Christopher, 1540–1591].

As a judge he was by no means disposed to minimise his jurisdiction, advised that the Treason Act did not supersede, but merely reinforced the common law, and that a lewd fellow, whom neither the pillory nor the loss of his ears could cure of speaking evil of the queen, might be punished either with imprisonment for life 'with all extremity of irons, and other strait feeding and keeping,' or by burning in the face or tongue, or public exposure, 'with jaws gagged in painful manner,' or excision of the tongue. He also held that non-attendance at church was punishable by fine, and favoured a rigorous treatment of puritans. Nevertheless, he seems to have been popular on circuit, Southampton conferring upon him its freedom on 28 March 1577.

He was a friend of Sir Thomas Gresham and Archbishop Matthew Parker, and steward of the liberties to the latter, in concert with whom he founded at Sandwich the grammar school which still bears his name. It was said of Manwood:

"A reverend judge of great and excellent knowledge of the law, and accompanied with a ready invention and good elocution"

— Sir Edward Coke, Barrister and Chief Justice of the King's Bench

"Five hundred in Kent would rejoice at his death"

— Richard Barrey, lieutenant of Dover castle, MP of Dover

"He is remembered as an exceptionally corrupt lawyer who gave vast sums to Kentish charities."

— N. M. Fuidge, MANWOOD, Roger II (by 1532-92), of the Inner Temple, London., The History of Parliament: the House of Commons 1509-1558, ed. S.T. Bindoff, 1982

== Notable Quotes ==
Of the four high courts of justice:

"In the common pleas there is all law and no conscience, in the queen's bench both law and conscience, in the chancery all conscience and no law, and in the exchequer neither law nor conscience."

— Sir Roger Manwood

Of 'corporations':

"As touching corporations, that they were invisible, immortal and that they had no soul, therefore no supoena lieth against them, because they have no conscience or soul"

— Sir Roger Manwood, Bulstrode, 'Reports,' pt. ii. p. 233.

== Philanthropy ==
Sir Roger provided a significant amount of money for the foundation in 1563 of Sir Roger Manwood's School in Sandwich, Kent, a free grammar school to bring education to the townspeople whose families could not afford it. This was done in concert with Sir Thomas Gresham and Archbishop Parker, and Parker's "steward of the liberties". It took the place of St. Peter's school, which had been suppressed in 1547 with the chantry of St. Thomas, to which it was attached. The school was built on a site near Canterbury Gate, and endowed partly out of Manwood's own funds and money bequeathed him for the purpose, partly by public subscription between 1563 and 1583.

Besides his school, he built a house of correction in Westgate, Canterbury, gave St. Stephen's Church a new peal of bells and a new transept—that under which he was buried — and procured in 1588 a substantial augmentation of the living.

In the 1570s Manwood built seven almshouses on St Stephen's Green in the vicinity of the church. Each of the six residents enjoyed one meal a week in Manwood's own house.

In his will the servants were generously treated. Those who had served Manwood for more than seven years received annuities of up to £10. Others could stay at St. Stephen's for a year after his death while they looked, if they chose, for suitable posts elsewhere. One bequest of £20 in his will was for the local poor for the relief of those afflicted by the plague.

== Connections with Queen Elizabeth ==
Roger Manwood attracted the favourable notice of the queen, who in 1563 granted him the royal manor of St. Stephen's, or Hackington, Kent, which he made his principal seat, rebuilding the house in "magnificent" style.

Queen Elizabeth lodged in Manwood's house near Sandwich in 1572, where Henry VIII had also previously been lodged.

== Death ==
Sir Roger died on 14 December 1592.

He was buried beneath an imposing marble monument, erected during his lifetime, in the south transept of St. Stephen's Church, near Canterbury. The monument was designed by Maximilian Colte (who later designed the famous tomb of Queen Elizabeth I in Westminster Abbey). It depicts snakes either side of his head, and his firm grasp on a money bag. Around his neck hangs a chain known by scholars as the "SS collar" (as has the effigy of Henry IV in Canterbury Cathedral). The tomb also depicts Manwood's wives and children, and incorporates a wooded skeleton claimed to be the most realistic in the county.

Christopher Marlowe, the well-known Elizabethan playwright and poet, wrote a eulogy in Latin hexameter after Manwood's death, entitled 'On the Death of Sir Roger Manwood' (cf. Works of Christopher Marlowe, ed. Dyce, iii. 308). The eulogy was discovered by J.P. Collier in the nineteenth century, in a common-place book ("Miscellanea", 1640's, now Folger MS. 750.1) which was owned by another Kentish gentleman, Henry Oxinden. The author is documented as being 'C.M.'. When translated to English, the meaning is not straightforward, and probably has elements of Latin wordplay. It has been described in various sections as ambivalent, ambiguous, conventionally eulogistic, cryptic, and even sarcastic.

In obitum honoratissimi viri Rogeri Manwood
militis quaestorii Reginalis Capitalis Baronis

Noctivagi terror, ganeonis triste flagellum,
Et Jovis Alcides, rigido vulturque latroni,
Urna subtegitur. Scelerum gaudete Nepotes.
Insons, luctifica sparsis cervice capillis
Plange, fori lumen, venerandae gloria legis,
Occidit: heu, secum effoetas Acherontis ad oras
Multa abiit virtus. Pro tot virtutibus uni,
Livor, parce viro; non audacissimus esto
Illius in cineres, cuius tot milia vultus
Mortalium attonuit: sic cum te nuntia Ditis
Vulneret exsanguis, feliciter ossa quiescant,
Famaque marmorei superet monumenta sepulchri.

An inquisition post mortem was taken about two and a half years later, 25 May 1595.

== Connections to Christopher Marlowe ==
The epitaph raises the question of why Marlowe should write his only known Latin poem in Manwood's memory. There are a few links.

Roger Manwood was one of the judges involved in Marlowe's trial, in December 1589, for the murder of a man. In September 1589 Christopher Marlowe and his friend and fellow dramatist, Thomas Watson, were involved in an affray which resulted in the death of one William Bradley. Thomas Watson and "Christoferus Marlowe nuper de [Norton Fowlgate] yoman" were arrested and committed to Newgate prison on 18 September 1589, on suspicion of the murder of William Bradley in Hog Lane in the parish of St Giles without Cripplegate. The inquest on Bradley's death was held the following day, but it was only nearly two weeks later, on 1 October, that "Christopher Marley of London, gentleman" was bailed. His sureties for the sum of £40 were "Richard Kytchine of Clifford's Inne, gentleman, & Humfrey Rowland of East Smithfeilde in the county aforesaid, horner". "Marlowe and Watson appeared at 'Justice hall in Le Olde Bailie' on 3 December 1589. On the bench sat the Lord Mayor of London, Sir John Harte; Chief Justices Wray of the Queen's Bench and Anderson of the Common Pleas; the Master of the Rolls, Sir Gilbert Gerrard, representing Chancery; Sir Roger Manwood, 15 Chief Baron of the Exchequer; Sir Rowland Heyward and Sir George Bond, Aldermen; Serjeant Fleetwood, Recorder of London; Robert Wroth, esquire etc ". Watson was subsequently found to have killed Bradley in self-defence, and Marlowe was duly discharged.

Roger Manwood was a friend of Matthew Parker, whose 'Parker scholarship' gave financial support to recipients studying at Corpus Christi College, Cambridge. Marlowe first entered Kings School, Canterbury, on 14 January 1579. A year later, reputedly under the Matthew Parker Scholarship, he entered Corpus Christi College to study for his MA. The Parker scholarship was restricted to a native of Canterbury, and was for those "poor boys, both destitute of the help of friends, and endowed with minds apt for learning" who had attended the King's School, Canterbury. Marlowe obtained his bachelor of arts degree in 1584. But Marlowe's scholarship continued and by 1587 Marlowe had held the scholarship for virtually the maximum permitted duration. In 1587, however, the university hesitated about granting him the master's degree; its doubts (arising from his frequent absences from the university) were apparently set at rest when the Privy Council sent a letter declaring that he had been employed "on matters touching the benefit of his country". Parker was master of Corpus Christi College, Cambridge (1544 to 1553), and vice chancellor of the University of Cambridge (1545, 1549). He was later Archbishop of Canterbury (1559–75) under Queen Elizabeth I.

Roger Manwood's family was connected with the theatre scene of London, of which Marlowe was a notable figure. Manwood's daughter Margaret was the first wife of Sir John Leveson. John Leveson's younger brother, William Leveson, acted as trustee to the Lord Chamberlain's Men, including William Shakespeare of Stratford upon Avon, in the allocation of shares in the ground lease of the Globe Theatre in 1599. Whilst the documented family connection is seven years after Manwood's death, and therefore somewhat tenuous, it is possible that Manwood had prior involvement himself.

== Richard and John Manwood ==
He is apparently sometimes mistakenly referred to as "Richard Manwood" (e.g. in the biography of Richard Boyle). He was a close relative, probably uncle, of John Manwood, a barrister of Lincoln's Inn, gamekeeper of Waltham Forest, and Justice in Eyre of the New Forest under Elizabeth I of England.

Legal offices
Preceded by Sir John Jeffery	Lord Chief Baron of the Exchequer; 1578–1592	Succeeded by Sir William Peryam
