= Hugh Hamilton Lindsay =

British politician (1802–1881)

Hugh Hamilton Lindsay (1802–1881) was a businessman with interest in China, perhaps the first British person to visit Shanghai.

The son of the Hon. Hugh Primrose Lindsay, a director of the East India Company and Jane Gordon, Lindsay went to China in 1820 and was a supercargo for the East India Company. He was the company's Secretary in Canton in 1830.

Lindsay led a clandestine reconnaissance of Chinese ports in 1832 along with Lutheran missionary Karl Gützlaff. Both speaking good Chinese, they visited Amoy, Fuzhou, Ningbo, Shanghai and the Shandong coast throughout the six-month expedition He was also a vociferous supporter of war against Qing China to advance business interests.

He was the Conservative M.P. for Sandwich from 1841 to 1847.

Having been one of the founding directors, he succeeded John MacGregor as Chairman of the Eastern Archipelago Company in 1851. The company was wound up in 1858. He was also the founder of Lindsay and Company of Hong Kong, a banking and shipping company which was bankrupted in 1865. In 1852 he had the tea clipper Challenger built for him.

== Literary works ==
- Report of proceedings on a voyage to the northern ports of China, in the ship Lord Amherst (1833)
- Letter to the Right Honourable Viscount Palmerston on British Relations with China(1836)
- The rupture with China, and its causes, including the opium question, and other important details in a letter to Lord Viscount Palmerston (1836)
- Is the war with China a just one (1840)
- Substance of an address on the church question, delivered at a meeting of conservative electors of the City of Aberdeen (1840)
- Remarks on occurrences in China since the opium seizure in March 1839 to the latest date. : By a resident in China(1840)
- The Eastern Archipelago Company and Sir James Brooke (1853)
