= James Thurbarne =

English politician

James Thurbarne (1607–1688) was an English politician who sat in the House of Commons at various times between 1656 and 1679.

Thurbarne was the second son of James Thurbarne lawyer of New Romney, Kent and his wife Mary Estcourt, daughter of Giles Estcourt of Salisbury, Wiltshire. He was a lawyer and became Jurat for Sandwich by 1642. He also became town clerk in 1642.

In 1656, Thurbarne was elected Member of Parliament for Sandwich in the Second Protectorate Parliament from which he was secluded. He became warden of St. Thomas's hospital, Sandwich in 1658. In 1659 he was re-elected MP for Sandwich in the Third Protectorate Parliament. He was a member of the county committee for Kent in 1659. In 1660 he was re-elected MP for Sandwich for the Convention Parliament. In August 1660 he became commissioner for assessment for Kent and for Sandwich. King Charles ordered his dismissal as jurat on 27 November 1660, but he was immediately re-elected by the corporation. He was re-elected MP for Sandwich in 1661 for the Cavalier Parliament. In 1662 he was ejected as jurat and town clerk by the commissioners for corporations. He was mayor of Sandwich in 1665 and was reinstated as town clerk and jurat in 1667. In 1679 he stood down from his seat at Sandwich in favour of his son John.

Thurbarne died at the age of 80 and was buried at S. Peter's, Sandwich on 23 May 1688.

Thurbarne married firstly Ellen Jacob, widow of John Jacob of Sandwich on 12 May 1635 and had two sons and a daughter. He married secondly Bennet Forster a widow on 18 November 1658.

Parliament of England
Preceded by Thomas Kelsey	Member of Parliament for Sandwich; 1656–1659; With: Sir Richard Meredith, 2nd Baronet 1659	Succeeded by Not represented in Restored Rump
