= Sandwich (constituency) =

Parliamentary constituency in the United Kingdom, 1801-1885

- Former borough constituency for the House of Commons

1366–1885
- Seats: two
- Replaced by: Isle of Thanet

Sandwich was a parliamentary constituency in Kent, which elected two Members of Parliament (MPs) to the House of Commons from 1366 until 1885, when it was disfranchised for corruption.

== History ==
Sandwich like most of the other Cinque Ports, was first enfranchised in the 14th century. As a Cinque Port it was technically of different status from a parliamentary borough, but the difference was in most respects purely a nominal one. (The writ for election was directed to the Lord Warden of the Cinque Ports, rather than the sheriff of the county, and its MPs were termed "barons" rather than "burgesses" as in boroughs.) Until 1832, the constituency consisted of the three parishes making up the town of Sandwich; it had once been a flourishing port but by the 19th century the harbour had silted up and there was only a limited maritime trade.

The right to vote was reserved to the freemen of the town, whether or not they were resident within the borough. In 1831 this amounted to 955 qualified voters, of whom only 320 lived in Sandwich. The freedom could be obtained by inheritance, by serving an apprenticeship, or by marrying the daughter or widow of a freeman; the corporation apparently did not, as in some boroughs, have the power to create unlimited numbers of honorary freemen so as to swamp the rights of the genuine freemen. At one period in the 17th century, the town corporation attempted to annex the right of voting to itself (as was the case in many other boroughs) on the grounds of "the avoidance of popular tumults common at elections", and in 1621 the Lord Warden ordered with the consent of the Privy Council that this should be so. However, the inhabitants of the town not only petitioned against the election result, but informed the Lord Warden that they intended to present a bill to Parliament to annul the result of that year's election and to restore their former privileges. In the event the petition against the election result was upheld and the election declared void, and the right of voting was in the freemen was confirmed by the Parliamentary Elections Act 1689 (2 Will. & Mar. c. 7) confirmed this.

For most of its existence, no single interest had a predominant influence in Sandwich so as to reduce it to a pocket borough, but the power of official patronage sometimes exerted some leverage. In Tudor times, the Lord Warden expected to be able to nominate one of the two MPs, but - unlike most of the other Cinque Ports - Sandwich consistently defied him, and made its own choice of both MPs throughout Queen Elizabeth's reign. In the 18th and 19th centuries, though, the influence of the navy (through the employment it provided) was sufficient that the Admiralty could be sure of choosing at least one MP at most elections. Nevertheless, Sandwich fell short of being a true "Admiralty borough", and generally elected members who would benefit the town. (They were, however, no less venal than in other boroughs: the committee investigating a disputed election in 1695 was told that the elected member had promised that if after election he were to gain paid office he would give half his salary to the corporation, that he would contribute £20 a year for the poor of the town and a treat to the corporation on the anniversary of his election.)

In 1831, the population of the constituency was 3,084, and the town contained 610 houses. This would not have been sufficient for the borough to retain both its MPs under the Great Reform Act, but the boundaries were extended so as to include the neighbouring towns of Deal and Walmer, which quadrupled the population. Even so, and despite the extension of the franchise, the revised constituency had only 916 qualified voters for the 1832 general election.

At a by-election in 1880, evidence of widespread bribery in Sandwich emerged. Its writ was suspended, and a Royal Commission appointed to investigate. It was found that out of an electorate of 2115, 1850 voted, of whom 900 admitted they had been bribed and 100 admitted they had bribed. As a result of its report, Sandwich was abolished as a constituency with effect from 25 June 1885, being incorporated into the Eastern Kent county division.

== Members of Parliament ==
=== 1366–1640 ===
Parliament	First member	Second member
1386	John Godard	William Ive
1388 (Feb)	William Jordan	Stephen Reyner
1388 (Sep)	John Berham	Peter Cundy
1390 (Jan)	John Berham	Stephen Reyner
1390 (Nov)		
1391	John Edward	William Jordan
1393	Stephen Reyner	Thomas atte Welle
1394		
1395	John Godard	John Nessche
1397 (Jan)	Richard Benge	John Godard
1397 (Sep)		
1399	John Godard	Stephen Peyntour
1401		
1402	John Godard	John Nessche
1404 (Jan)		
1404 (Oct)		
1406	Henry Loveryk	John Norton
1407	Richard Mildenale	John Norton
1410	John Gyllyng	Robert Haddon
1411		
1413 (Feb)		
1413 (May)	John Geldeford	John Gyllyng
1414 (Apr)		
1414 (Nov)	Simon Halle	Richard Mildenale
1415		
1416 (Mar)		
1416 (Oct)		
1417	William Gayler	Richard Mildenale
1419	Laurence Cundy	Thomas Loveryk
1420	John Bolle	Laurence Cundy
1421 (May)	Simon Halle	Laurence Cundy
1421 (Dec)	John Bolle	Laurence Cundy
1485	Thomas Overton	
1491	John Naseby	
1510	John Westcliff	John Cock
1512	John Westcliff	John Hobard
1515	John Westcliff	John Hobard
1523	John Somer	Roger Manwood
1529	Vincent Engeham	John Boys, died and replaced Dec 1553 by Thomas Wingfield
1536	Thomas Wingfield	Vincent Engeham
1539	Thomas Patche	Nicholas Peake
1542	John Lee	Thomas Rolfe
1545	John Master	Thomas Menys
1547 (first election)	Thomas Pinnock	John Seer
1547 (second election)	Thomas Patche	Thomas Ardern (Note: This election was called at request of the borough Mayor, with Patche and Ardern returned but the return was declared invalid by Privy Council after appeal.)
1553 (Mar)	Thomas Patche	Thomas Menys
1553 (Oct)	Sir John Perrot	Simon Linch
1554 (Apr)	John Master	Simon Linch
1554 (Nov)	John Tysar	Nicholas Crispe
1555	Nicholas Peake	Sir John Perrot
1558	Roger Manwood	Nicholas Crispe
1559	Roger Manwood	John Tysar
1562–3	Roger Manwood	Rice Perrot
1571	Roger Manwood	John Manwood
1572	Roger Manwood, made a judge replaced Jul 1576 by Edward Peake	John Boys
1584	Edward Peake	Edward Wood
1586	Edward Peake	Edward Wood
1588–9	Peter Manwood	Edward Peake
1593	Peter Manwood	Edward Peake
1597	Peter Manwood	Edward Peake
1601	Peter Manwood	Edward Peake
1604-1611	Sir George Fane	Edward Peake died replaced by John Griffith
1614	Thomas Smythe	Sir Samuel Peyton, 1st Baronet
1621-1622	Sir Edwin Sandys	Sir Robert Hatton election voided - replaced by John Burroughes
1624	Sir Robert Hatton	Francis Drake
1625	Sir Henry Wotton	Sir Robert Hatton
1626	Sir John Suckling sat for Norwich, replaced by Sir Edward Boys	Peter Peake
1628	John Philipot	Peter Peake
1629–1640	No Parliaments summoned	

=== 1640–1885 ===
Year	First member	First party	Second member	Second party
April 1640	Sir John Manwood		Nathaniel Finch	
November 1640	Sir Thomas Peyton	Royalist	Sir Edward Partridge	Parliamentarian
February 1644	Peyton disabled from sitting - seat vacant		Sir Edward Partridge	Parliamentarian
1645	Charles Rich		Sir Edward Partridge	Parliamentarian
December 1648	Rich and Partridge excluded in Pride's Purge - both seats vacant			
1653	Sandwich was unrepresented in the Barebones Parliament			
1654	Colonel Thomas Kelsey		Sandwich had only one seat in the First and Second Parliaments of the Protectorate	
1656	James Thurbarne		Sandwich had only one seat in the First and Second Parliaments of the Protectorate	
January 1659	James Thurbarne		Richard Meredith	
May 1659	Not represented in the restored Rump			
April 1660	James Thurbarne		Henry Oxenden	
1661	James Thurbarne		Edward Montagu	
1665	James Thurbarne		John Strode	
1679	John Thurbarne		Sir James Oxenden	
1685	John Strode		Sir Philip Parker	
1689	John Thurbarne		Sir James Oxenden	
1690	John Thurbarne		Edward Brent	
1695	John Taylor		Edward Brent	
April 1698	John Taylor		John Thurbarne	
July 1698	John Michel		John Thurbarne	
January 1701	Henry Furnese (Note: Created a baronet, June 1707)		John Taylor	
April 1701	John Michel		John Taylor	
November 1701	Sir Henry Furnese		Sir James Oxenden	
1702	Sir Henry Furnese		John Michel	
1705	Sir Henry Furnese		Josiah Burchett	Court Whig
April 1713	John Michel		Josiah Burchett	Court Whig
August 1713	John Michel		Sir Henry Oxenden	
1715	(Sir) Thomas D'Aeth (Note: Created a baronet, July 1716)		Sir Henry Oxenden	
1720	(Sir) Thomas D'Aeth		Sir George Oxenden	Whig
1722	Josiah Burchett	Whig	Sir George Oxenden	Whig
1741	John Pratt		Sir George Oxenden	Whig
1747	John Clevland		Sir George Oxenden	Whig
1754	John Clevland		Claudius Amyand	
1756	John Clevland		Henry Conyngham	
1761	George Hay		Henry Conyngham	
1768	(Sir) Philip Stephens (Note: Created a baronet, March 1795)		Henry Conyngham	
1774	(Sir) Philip Stephens		William Hey	
1776	(Sir) Philip Stephens		Charles Brett	Tory
1780	(Sir) Philip Stephens		Sir Richard Sutton	
1784	(Sir) Philip Stephens		Charles Brett	Whig
1790	(Sir) Philip Stephens		Sir Horatio Mann	
1806	Captain Thomas Fremantle		Sir Horatio Mann	
1807	Admiral Peter Rainier		Charles Jenkinson	
1808	John Spratt Rainier		Charles Jenkinson	
1812	Joseph Marryatt, Snr.		Sir Joseph Sydney Yorke	
1818	Joseph Marryatt, Snr.		Sir George Warrender	
1824	Henry Bonham		Sir George Warrender	
1826	Joseph Marryatt, Jnr.	Non Partisan	Sir Edward Owen	Tory
1829	Joseph Marryatt, Jnr.	Non Partisan	Lieutenant-General Sir Henry Fane	Tory
1830	Joseph Marryatt, Jnr.	Whig	Samuel Grove Price	Tory
1831	Joseph Marryatt, Jnr.	Whig	Sir Edward Troubridge	Whig
1835	Samuel Grove Price	Conservative	Sir Edward Troubridge	Whig
1837	Sir James Rivett-Carnac	Whig	Sir Edward Troubridge	Whig
1839	General Sir Rufane Shaw Donkin	Whig	Sir Edward Troubridge	Whig
1841	Hugh Hamilton Lindsay	Conservative	Sir Edward Troubridge	Whig
1847	Lord Clarence Paget	Whig	Charles Grenfell	Whig
May 1852	Lord Clarence Paget	Whig	Lord Charles Clinton	Conservative
July 1852	James Macgregor	Conservative	Lord Charles Clinton	Conservative
1857	Edward Knatchbull-Hugessen	Whig	Lord Clarence Paget	Whig
1859	Edward Knatchbull-Hugessen	Liberal	Lord Clarence Paget	Liberal
1866	Edward Knatchbull-Hugessen	Liberal	Charles Capper	Conservative
1868	Edward Knatchbull-Hugessen	Liberal	Henry Brassey	Liberal
May 1880	Charles Henry Crompton-Roberts (Note: On petition the result of the 1880 by-election was declared void)	Conservative	Henry Brassey	Liberal
Aug 1880	Writ suspended and seat left vacant after evidence of bribery was uncovered.		Henry Brassey	Liberal
1885	Following Royal Commission investigation of corruption, constituency abolished and absorbed into Eastern Kent			

== Election results ==
=== Elections in the 1830s ===
General election 1830: Sandwich (2 seats)
Party	Candidate	Votes	%
Whig	Joseph Marryat (1790–1876)	Unopposed	
Tory	Samuel Grove Price	Unopposed	
Whig gain from Nonpartisan			
Tory hold			

General election 1831: Sandwich (2 seats)
Party	Candidate	Votes	%
Whig	Joseph Marryat (1790–1876)	498	41.8
Whig	Edward Troubridge	397	33.3
Tory	Samuel Grove Price	297	24.9
Majority		100	8.4
Turnout		700	c. 75.3
Registered electors		c. 930	
Whig hold			
Whig gain from Tory			

General election 1832: Sandwich (2 seats)
Party	Candidate	Votes	%	±%
Whig	Joseph Marryat (1790–1876)	495	30.8	−11.0
Whig	Edward Troubridge	485	30.2	−3.1
Tory	Samuel Grove Price	361	22.5	+10.1
Tory	Edward Owen	265	16.5	+4.1
Majority		124	7.7	−0.7
Turnout		847	92.5	c. +17.2
Registered electors		916		
Whig hold		Swing	−9.1	
Whig hold		Swing	−5.1	

General election 1835: Sandwich (2 seats)
Party	Candidate	Votes	%	±%
Conservative	Samuel Grove Price	551	41.0	+18.5
Whig	Edward Troubridge	405	30.1	−30.9
Conservative	Edward Owen	389	28.9	+12.4
Turnout		841	90.0	−2.5
Registered electors		934		
Majority		66	10.9	N/A
Conservative gain from Whig		Swing	+17.0	
Majority		16	1.2	−6.5
Whig hold		Swing	−30.9	

Troubridge was appointed a Lord Commissioner of the Admiralty, requiring a by-election.

By-election, 27 April 1835: Sandwich
Party	Candidate	Votes	%
Whig	Edward Troubridge	Unopposed	
Whig hold			

General election 1837: Sandwich (2 seats)
Party	Candidate	Votes	%	±%
Whig	Edward Troubridge	416	27.4	+12.4
Whig	James Rivett-Carnac	401	26.4	+11.4
Conservative	Samuel Grove Price	370	24.4	−16.6
Conservative	Brook Bridges	330	21.8	−7.1
Majority		31	2.0	+0.8
Turnout		769	84.4	−5.6
Registered electors		911		
Whig hold		Swing	+12.1	
Whig gain from Conservative		Swing	+11.6	

Rivett-Carnac resigned after being appointed Governor of Bombay, requiring a by-election.

By-election, 12 February 1839: Sandwich
Party	Candidate	Votes	%
Whig	Rufane Shaw Donkin	Unopposed	
Whig hold			

=== Elections in the 1840s ===
Donkin's death caused a by-election.

By-election, 11 May 1841: Sandwich
Party	Candidate	Votes	%	±%
Conservative	Hugh Hamilton Lindsay	406	53.0	+6.8
Whig	Charles Richard Fox	360	47.0	−6.8
Majority		46	6.0	N/A
Turnout		766	80.5	−3.9
Registered electors		952		
Conservative gain from Whig		Swing	+6.8	

General election 1841: Sandwich (2 seats)
Party	Candidate	Votes	%	±%
Whig	Edward Troubridge	Unopposed		
Conservative	Hugh Hamilton Lindsay	Unopposed		
Registered electors		952		
Whig hold				
Conservative gain from Whig				

General election 1847: Sandwich (2 seats)
Party	Candidate	Votes	%	±%
Whig	Clarence Paget	459	35.6	N/A
Whig	Charles Grenfell	437	33.9	N/A
Conservative	Charles Pelham-Clinton	392	30.4	N/A
Majority		45	3.5	N/A
Turnout		840 (est)	89.1 (est)	N/A
Registered electors		943		
Whig hold		Swing	N/A	
Whig gain from Conservative		Swing	N/A	

=== Elections in the 1850s ===
Grenfell resigned in order to contest a by-election at Windsor, causing a by-election.

By-election, 28 May 1852: Sandwich (1 seat)
Party	Candidate	Votes	%	±%
Conservative	Lord Charles Clinton	460	64.2	+33.8
Whig	John Tracy William French	257	35.8	−33.7
Majority		203	28.4	N/A
Turnout		717	74.7	−14.4
Registered electors		960		
Conservative gain from Whig		Swing	+33.8	

General election 1852: Sandwich (2 seats)
Party	Candidate	Votes	%	±%
Conservative	Lord Charles Clinton	Unopposed		
Conservative	James Macgregor	Unopposed		
Registered electors		960		
Conservative gain from Whig				
Conservative gain from Whig				

General election 1857: Sandwich (2 seats)
Party	Candidate	Votes	%	±%
Whig	Edward Knatchbull-Hugessen	547	39.2	New
Whig	Clarence Paget	503	36.0	New
Conservative	James Macgregor	322	23.1	N/A
Whig	John Lang	24	1.7	New
Majority		181	12.9	N/A
Turnout		847 (est)	84.0 (est)	N/A
Registered electors		1,008		
Whig gain from Conservative		Swing	N/A	
Whig gain from Conservative		Swing	N/A	

General election 1859: Sandwich (2 seats)
Party	Candidate	Votes	%	±%
Liberal	Edward Knatchbull-Hugessen	497	29.5	−9.7
Liberal	Clarence Paget	458	27.1	−8.9
Conservative	James Fergusson	404	23.9	+12.3
Conservative	William David Lewis	328	19.4	+7.8
Majority		54	3.2	−9.7
Turnout		844 (est)	81.9 (est)	−2.1
Registered electors		1,030		
Liberal hold		Swing	−9.9	
Liberal hold		Swing	−9.5	

Knatchbull-Hugessen was appointed a Lord Commissioner of the Treasury, requiring a by-election.

By-election, 28 June 1859: Sandwich
Party	Candidate	Votes	%	±%
Liberal	Edward Knatchbull-Hugessen	463	62.1	+5.5
Conservative	James Fergusson	283	37.9	−5.4
Majority		180	24.2	+21.0
Turnout		746	72.4	−9.5
Registered electors		1,030		
Liberal hold		Swing	+5.5	

=== Elections in the 1860s ===
General election 1865: Sandwich (2 seats)
Party	Candidate	Votes	%	±%
Liberal	Edward Knatchbull-Hugessen	494	35.7	+6.2
Liberal	Clarence Paget	477	34.5	+7.4
Conservative	Charles Capper	413	29.8	−14.5
Majority		64	4.7	+1.5
Turnout		899 (est)	85.2 (est)	+3.3
Registered electors		1,054		
Liberal hold		Swing	+6.7	
Liberal hold		Swing	+7.3	

Paget resigned, causing a by-election.

By-election, 8 May 1866: Sandwich (1 seat)
Party	Candidate	Votes	%	±%
Conservative	Charles Capper	466	50.4	+20.6
Liberal	Thomas Brassey	458	49.6	−20.6
Majority		8	0.8	N/A
Turnout		924	87.7	+2.5
Registered electors		1,054		
Conservative gain from Liberal		Swing	+20.6	

General election 1868: Sandwich (2 seats)
Party	Candidate	Votes	%	±%
Liberal	Edward Knatchbull-Hugessen	933	36.4	+0.7
Liberal	Henry Brassey	923	36.0	+1.5
Conservative	Henry Worms	710	27.7	−2.1
Majority		213	8.3	+3.6
Turnout		1,638 (est)	85.9 (est)	+0.7
Registered electors		1,906		
Liberal hold		Swing	+0.9	
Liberal hold		Swing	+1.3	

=== Elections in the 1870s ===
General election 1874: Sandwich (2 seats)
Party	Candidate	Votes	%	±%
Liberal	Henry Brassey	1,035	30.3	−5.7
Liberal	Edward Knatchbull-Hugessen	1,006	29.4	−7.0
Conservative	Frederic C Hughes Hallett	764	22.4	+8.5
Conservative	Hugh Sydney Baillie	611	17.9	+4.0
Majority		242	7.0	−1.3
Turnout		1,708 (est)	83.5 (est)	−2.4
Registered electors		2,046		
Liberal hold		Swing	−6.0	
Liberal hold		Swing	−6.6	

=== Elections in the 1880s ===
General election 1880: Sandwich (2 seats)
Party	Candidate	Votes	%	±%
Liberal	Henry Brassey	Unopposed		
Liberal	Edward Knatchbull-Hugessen	Unopposed		
Registered electors		2,115		
Liberal hold				
Liberal hold				

Hugessen resigned in advance of being elevated to the peerage, causing a by-election.

By-election, 19 May 1880: Sandwich (1 seat)
Party	Candidate	Votes	%	±%
Conservative	Charles Henry Crompton-Roberts	1,145	61.9	New
Liberal	Julian Goldsmid	705	38.1	N/A
Majority		440	23.8	N/A
Turnout		1,850	87.5	N/A
Registered electors		2,115		
Conservative gain from Liberal		Swing	N/A	

A Royal Commission found proof of extensive bribery and the writ was suspended, with the by-election result being voided. The writ was never returned and the constituency was merged into East Kent on 25 June 1885, before that seat was then abolished for the 1885 general election.

== Sources ==
1. Robert Beatson, A Chronological Register of Both Houses of Parliament (London: Longman, Hurst, Res & Orme, 1807)
2. D Brunton & D H Pennington, Members of the Long Parliament (London: George Allen & Unwin, 1954)
3. Cobbett's Parliamentary history of England, from the Norman Conquest in 1066 to the year 1803 (London: Thomas Hansard, 1808)
4. J. E. Neale, The Elizabethan House of Commons (London: Jonathan Cape, 1949)
5. T. H. B. Oldfield, The Representative History of Great Britain and Ireland (London: Baldwin, Cradock & Joy, 1816)
6. J Holladay Philbin, Parliamentary Representation 1832 - England and Wales (New Haven: Yale University Press, 1965)
7. Edward Porritt and Annie G Porritt, The Unreformed House of Commons (Cambridge University Press, 1903)
8. Leigh Rayment's Historical List of MPs – Constituencies beginning with "S" (part 2)
