= Samuel Grove Price =

British barrister and Tory politician

Samuel Grove Price (17 June 1793 – 17 June 1839) was a British barrister and Tory politician. He was twice Member of Parliament for Sandwich from 1830 to 1831 and from 1835 to 1837.
