= Henry Oxenden =

Henry Oxenden may refer to:

- Henry Oxenden (poet) (1609–1670), English poet
- Sir Henry Oxenden, 1st Baronet (1614–1686), English politician
- Sir Henry Oxenden, 3rd Baronet (1645–1709), deputy-governor of Bombay
- Sir Henry Oxenden, 4th Baronet (1690–1720), MP for Sandwich

== See also ==
- Oxenden baronets for Sir Henry Oxenden, 6th Baronet, Sir Henry Oxenden, 7th Baronet, Sir Henry Chudleigh Oxenden, 8th Baronet and Sir Henry Montagu Oxenden, 9th Baronet
