= Governor Oxenden =

Governor Oxenden may refer to:

- George Oxenden (governor) (1620–1669), 1st Governor of the Bombay Presidency
- Sir Henry Oxenden, 3rd Baronet (1645–1709), English Deputy-Governor of Bombay of East India Company from 1677 to 1681
