= Dixwell baronets of Broome House (1660) =

Escutcheon of the Dixwell baronets

The Dixwell baronetcy, of Broome House in the County of Kent, was created on 19 June 1660, for Basil Dixwell. He was the great-nephew and heir of Sir Basil Dixwell, 1st Baronet of Tirlington, from whom he inherited the Broome House estate.

His son the 2nd Baronet was Governor of Dover Castle, and Member of Parliament for Dover 1689–90 and 1699–1700. He died without issue in 1750, when the baronetcy became extinct.

== Dixwell baronets, of Broome House (1660) ==
- Sir Basil Dixwell, 1st Baronet (1640–1668)
- Sir Basil Dixwell, 2nd Baronet (1665–1750)

== Extended family ==
The 2nd Baronet left his estate to his youngest nephew, Sir George Oxenden, 5th Baronet, through his sister Elizabeth Oxenden (see Oxenden baronets). As a condition George Oxenden was required to take on the surname of Dixwell, which he implemented by a private act of Parliament, Oxenden's Name Act 1751 (25 Geo. 2. c. 1 Pr.).
