= Henry Oxenden (poet) =

English poet

Henry Oxenden, or Oxinden (18 January 1609 – June 1670), was an English poet.

== Early life ==
Oxenden was the eldest son of Richard Oxinden (1588–1629), of Little Maydekin in Barham, Kent and Katherine, daughter of Sir Adam Sprakeling of Canterbury. He was born in the parish of St. Paul's, Canterbury. His grandfather was Sir Henry Oxinden (d. 1620) of Dene in Wingham, Kent. His first cousins included Sir Henry Oxenden, 4th Baronet, who was MP for Sandwich in 1660, and who was created a baronet, and Sir George Oxenden, governor of Bombay.

He matriculated from Corpus Christi College, Oxford, on 10 November 1626, and graduated BA 1 April 1627. He was appointed rector of Radnage in Buckinghamshire in 1663, and held that benefice until his death in June 1670.

== Marriage and issue ==
He married, first, on 28 December 1632, Anne (died 1640), daughter of Sir Samuel Peyton, by whom he had a son Thomas, baptised on 27 February 1633. His second marriage, on 15 September 1642, was to Katherine (died 1698), daughter of James Cullen, by whom he left no male issue.

== Work ==
Oxinden was author of: ‘Religionis Funus et Hypocritæ Finis,’ 1647; ‘Jobus Triumphans,’ 1651; 'Image Royal,’ 1660, and ‘Charles Triumphant: a Poem,’ 1660. He was buried on 17 June 1670 at Denton, Kent.

== Letters ==
Oxenden was a collector of letters. Not just letters to himself but letters by people he knew. These letters were edited and published by Dorothy Gardiner in 1933 and 1937.
