= Dixwell (disambiguation) =

John Dixwell was an English regicide.

Dixwell may also refer to:

- Dixwell (New Haven)
- Dixwell baronets
- Basil Dixwell (disambiguation)
