= Broome Park =

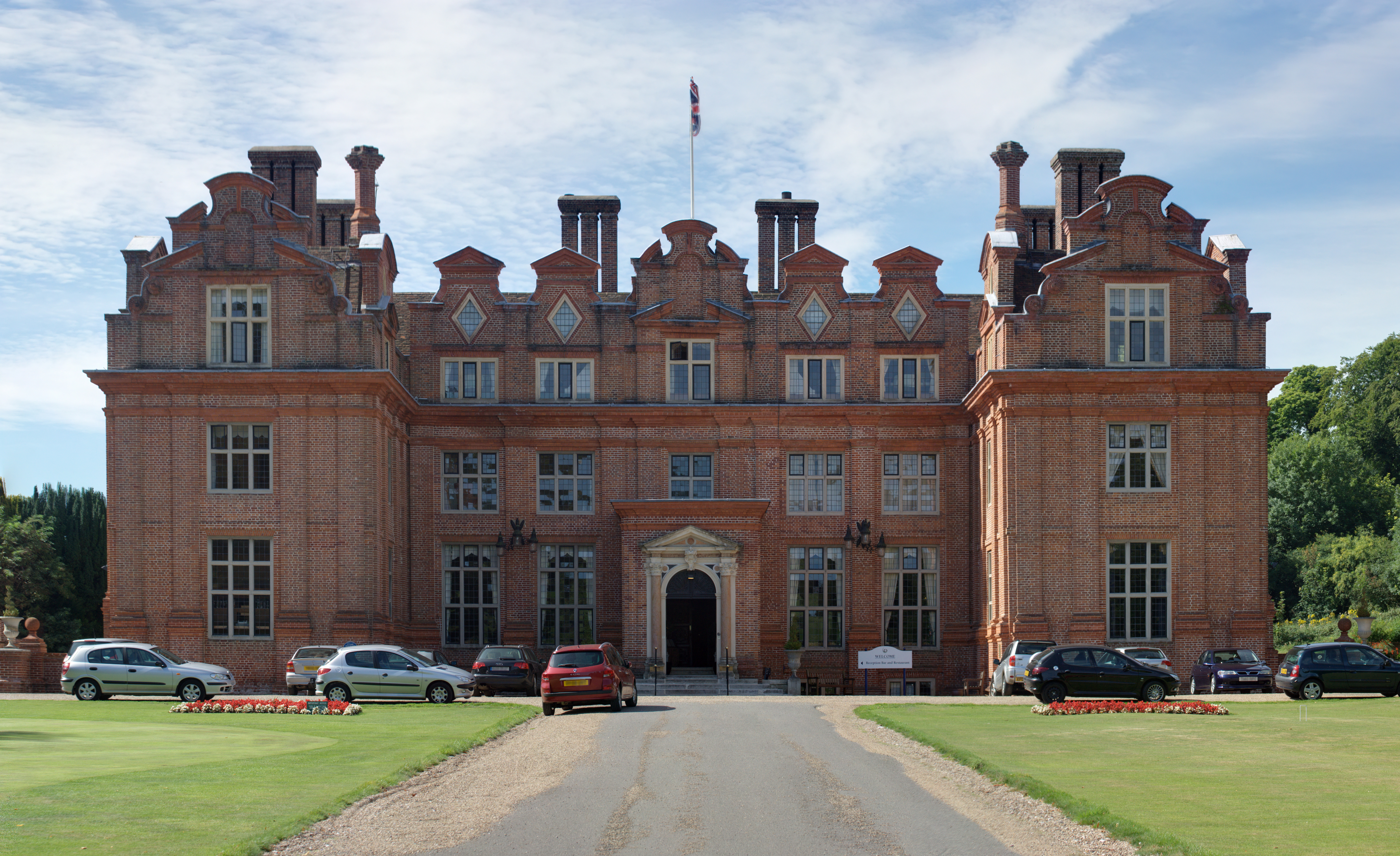

- Location within Kent
- 51.1903°N 1.1738°E
- Type: House
- Location: Barham, Kent, England

History
- Built: 1635-1638, 18th century enlargement, 20th century remodelling

Site notes
- Architectural style: Jacobean
- Governing body: Privately owned

Listed Building – Grade I
- Official name: Broome Park Hotel
- Designated: 29 September 1952
- Reference no.: 1084927

Listed Building – Grade II*
- Official name: The Steward's House, Broome Park Hotel
- Designated: 30 January 1967
- Reference no.: 1111767

Listed Building – Grade II
- Official name: Loggia, Attached Walls, Niches Containing Statues, Fountain, Stone Garden Ornaments, Statue and Urn in the Italian Garden to Broome Park Hotel
- Designated: 30 January 1967
- Reference no.: 1336874

Listed Building – Grade II
- Official name: The Stables of Broome Park Hotel
- Designated: 30 January 1967
- Reference no.: 1337428

Listed Building – Grade II
- Official name: Broome Cottage, Broome Park
- Designated: 14 March 1980
- Reference no.: 1084928

Broome Park is a country house in Barham, within the City of Canterbury, Kent, England. It was built for Basil Dixwell between 1635 and 1638. In the early 20th century it was the country home of Lord Kitchener of Khartoum until his death at sea in 1916. Now a country club, Broome Park is a Grade I listed building.

== History ==
=== Construction and early period ===
The house was built between 1635 and 1638. Commissioned for Sir Basil Dixwell, 1st Baronet, who had been Member of Parliament for Hythe, it passed down through various generations of Dixwell baronets until it was inherited by Sir George Oxenden, 5th Baronet, who took on his mother's surname of Dixwell by a private act of Parliament, Oxenden's Name Act 1751 (25 Geo. 2. c. 1 Pr.). It then passed down through various generations of Oxenden baronets, including Sir Henry Oxenden, 7th Baronet, to Sir Percy Dixwell Nowell Dixwell-Oxenden, 10th Baronet.

=== Kitchener ownership ===
Sir Percy, the last Oxenden baronet, sold the estate to Herbert Kitchener, 1st Earl Kitchener in 1911. Aged 61 and having been passed over for the position of Indian Viceroy Kitchener anticipated pending retirement in a country residence. "I have bought a house in Kent", he wrote. "It is rather a big place and will want a lot of doing up but as I have nothing else to do it will interest me enormously to make it a nice abode".

Kitchener commissioned Detmar Blow (1867-1939) and Fernand Billerey to carry out a major remodelling and to create the formal gardens and a formal carriage approach. Contractors involved included George P. Bankart, W. Bainbridge Reynolds ("sconces in silver copper"), Cowtan & Sons (wood panelling), Shanks (heaters) and Maples of London (panelling and a table design). Because of the extensive work being carried out on the property and Kitchener's professional commitments as Sirdar in Egypt and subsequently Secretary of War in London, he only lived in Broome Park for brief periods: notably for six weeks while on home leave immediately prior to the outbreak of the First World War. Full-time occupancy of the house was intended for his postponed retirement. However between 1914 and 1916 Kitchener spent his limited spare time in what his aide-de-camp described as "the one relaxation which Lord Kitchener allows himself - the building of his house. It gives him such intense pleasure every Saturday when he comes down and sees the good work that has been done".

=== Post World War I ===
Following Kitchener's death by drowning in June 1916, Broome Park passed to his nephew and heir Toby, Viscount Broome, who completed the required renovations before selling the property in 1928. In the early 1930s the estate was bought by Mr G C Jell who transformed the house into a country house hotel. During the Second World War the estate was requisitioned by the Ministry of Defence, serving as a base for a Canadian armoured regiment at one stage.

In or before 1979 the Park was acquired by Gulf Shipping, for the purposes of developing a timeshare and leisure complex. The development was the subject of litigation, which went to the UK Supreme Court in 2018. Today Broome Park is a timeshare hotel and club house for a golf course.

== Gallery ==
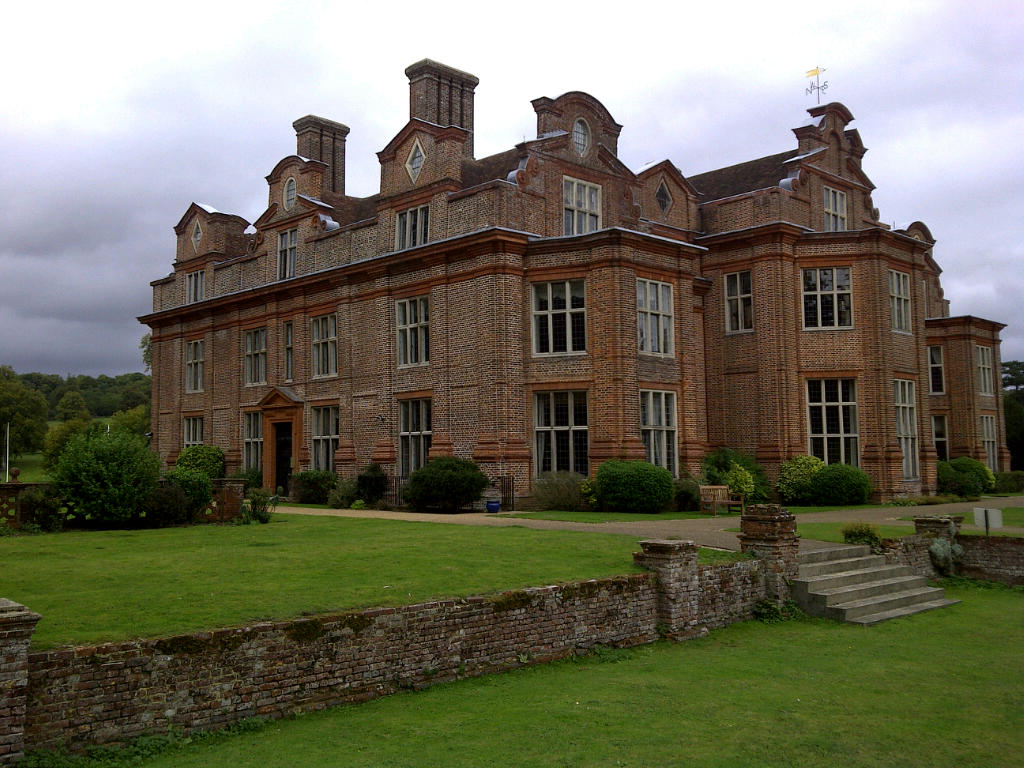
Side facade

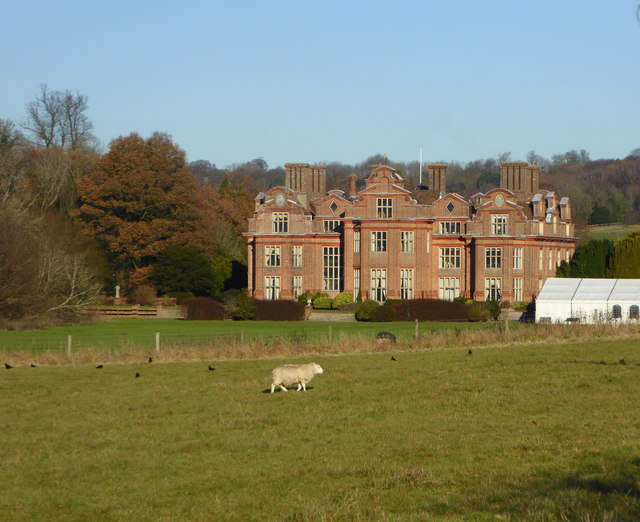
The house from across the parkland
