= Sir Henry Oxenden, 7th Baronet =

English landowner and baronet (1756-1838)

Sir Henry Oxenden, Bt
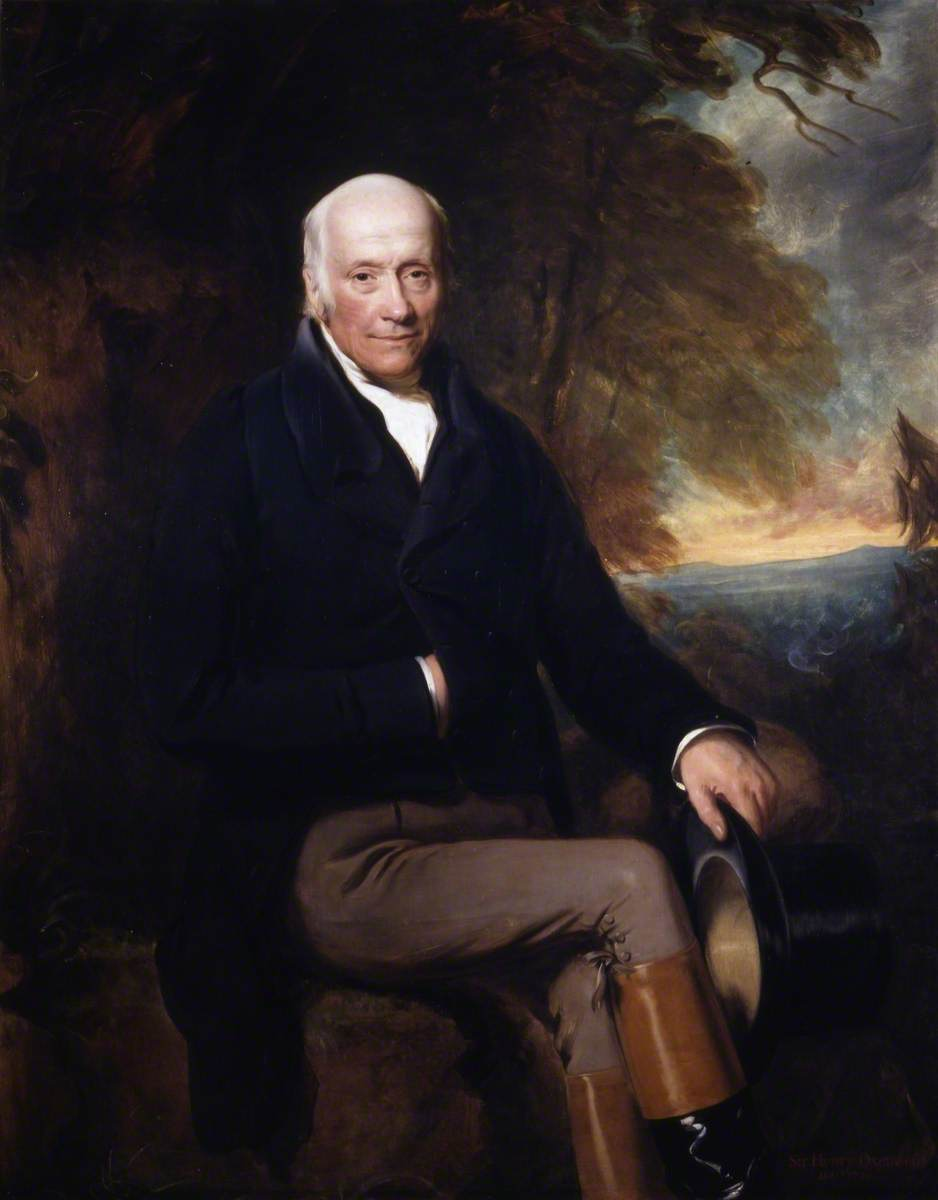
- Portrait of Sir Henry, by James Godsell Middleton
- Born: 14 May 1756
- Died: 22 September 1838 (aged 82); Broome Park, Kent
- Spouse: Mary Graham (m. 1793; died 1814)
- Children: 11, including Ashton
- Parent(s): Sir Henry Oxenden, 6th Baronet; Margaret Chudleigh
- Relatives: Sir Percy Dixwell-Oxenden, 10th Baronet (grandson); Philip Oxenden Papillon (grandson)

Sir Henry Oxenden, 7th Baronet (14 May 1756 – 22 September 1838) was an English landowner and baronet.

== Early life ==
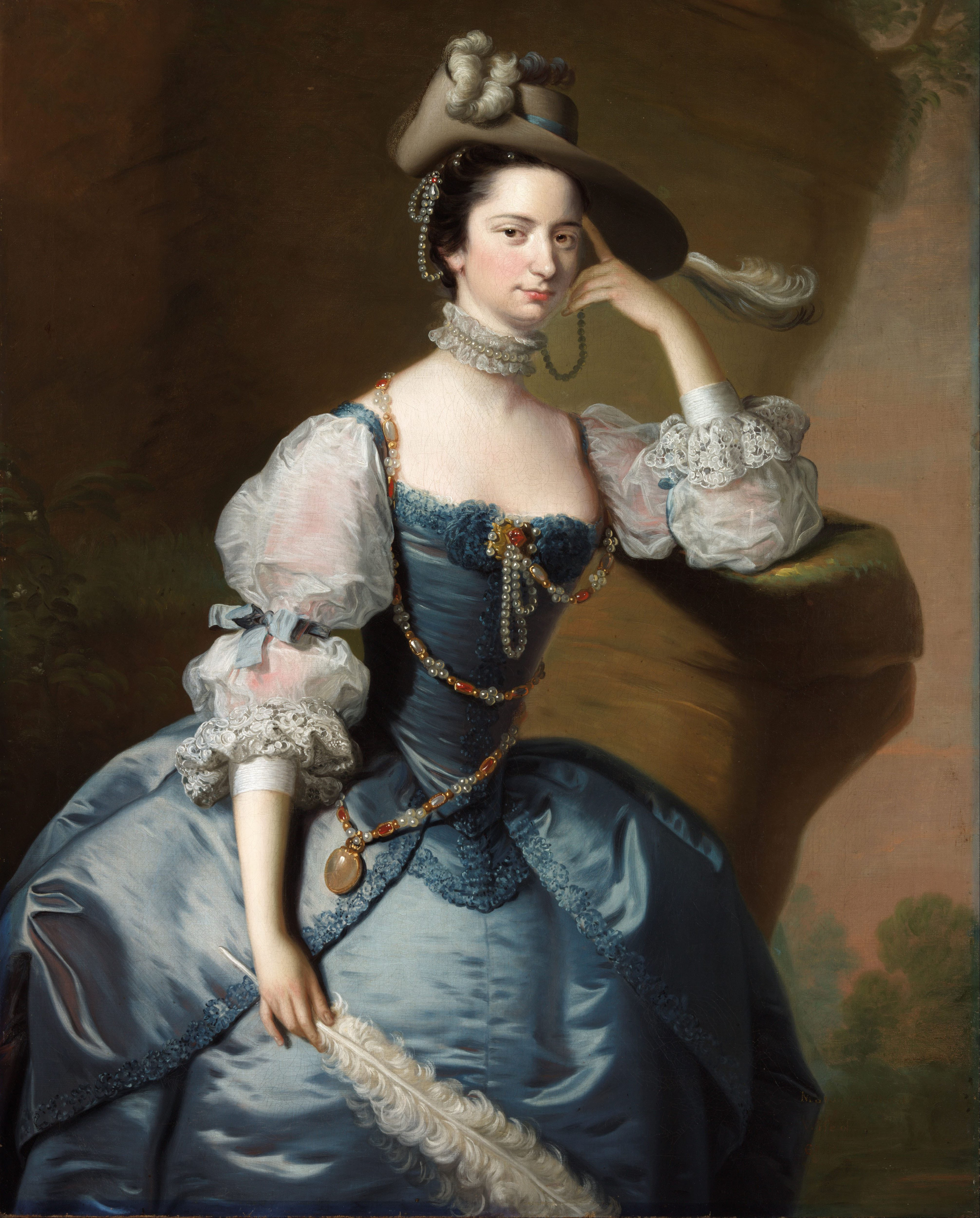
Portrait of his mother, Margaret, Lady Oxenden, by Thomas Hudson, c. 1755-1756

Oxenden was born on 14 May 1756. He was the son of Sir Henry Oxenden, 6th Baronet and Margaret Chudleigh.

His paternal grandparents were Sir George Oxenden, 5th Baronet, MP for Sandwich, and the former Elizabeth Dunch (the daughter of Edmund Dunch, the Master of the Royal Household to Queen Anne). His grandmother's sister, Harriet Dunch, married the 3rd Duke of Manchester. His mother was the younger daughter and co-heiress of Sir George Chudleigh, 4th Baronet of Haldon House near Exeter, and Frances Davie (a daughter of Sir William Davie, 4th Baronet).

== Career ==
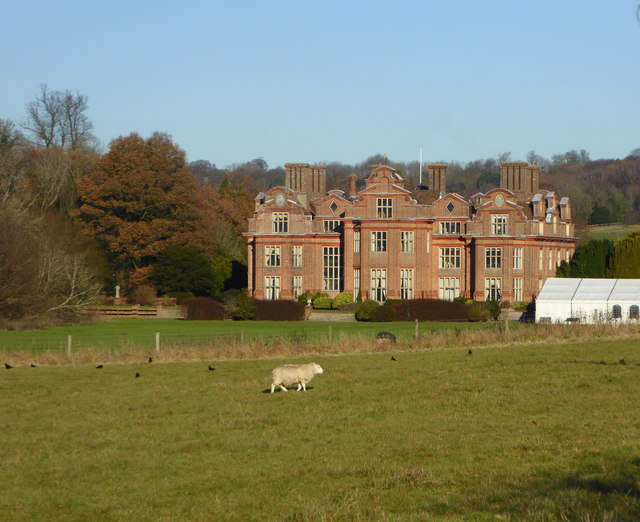
Broome Park, Kent

Upon the death of his father, he became the 7th Baronet Oxenden and inherited the family seat, Broome Park in Kent.

He served fifty years as a Commissioner of Dover Harbour.

== Personal life ==
On 30 June 1793 at Salisbury, Wiltshire, he was married to Mary Graham (d. 1814), the daughter of Col. John Graham, of St. Lawrence House, near Canterbury; former Lieutenant governor of Georgia. Together, they were the parents of eleven children, six sons and five daughters, including:

- Mary Graham Oxenden (1794–1870), who married William Osmond Hammond, a son of William Hammond and Elizabeth (née Beauvoir) Hammond, in 1815.
- Sir Henry Chudleigh Oxenden, 8th Baronet (1795–1889), who married Charlotte Brown, a daughter of Capt. Brown of the Royal Navy, in 1830. After her death in 1843, he married Elizabeth Phoebe King, a daughter of James King of Brighton, at St George's, Hanover Square in 1848.
- George Chichester Oxenden (1798–1875), author of satiric verse and parodies, who died unmarried.
- Montagu Oxenden (1799–1880), the Rector of Eastwell and Luddenham; he married Elizabeth Wilson, daughter of Robert Wilson, in 1824. After her death in 1862, he married Elizabeth, widow of James Marjoribanks of Sandgate, in 1869.
- Charles Oxenden (1800–1874), the Rector of Barham, Kent and honorary canon of Canterbury Cathedral; he married Catherine Elizabeth Holcombe, daughter of the Rev. George Holcombe, D.D. prebendary of Westminster.
- Frances Margaret Oxenden (1804–1885), who married Thomas Papillon of Crowhurst Park, son of Thomas Papillon and Anne Cressett-Pelham, in 1825.
- Ashton Oxenden (1808–1892), the Bishop of Montreal; he married Sarah Bradshaw, a daughter of London banker Joseph Hoare Bradshaw, in 1864.
- William Dixwell Oxenden (1813–1859), who married Anna Maria Edwards, the only daughter of William Edwards, in 1847.

Lady Oxenden died in 1814. Sir Henry died on 22 September 1838 at Broome Park, Kent.

=== Descendants ===
Through his younger son Montagu, he was a grandfather of Agnes Graham Oxenden, who married Rev. William Robert Finch-Hatton (a son of the Rev. Daniel Heneage Finch-Hatton), Sir Henry Montagu Oxenden, 9th Baronet (1826–1895), who died unmarried, and Sir Percy Dixwell Nowell Dixwell-Oxenden, 10th Baronet (1833–1924), upon whose death the baronetcy became extinct. Sir Percy sold the Broome Park estate to Herbert Kitchener, 1st Earl Kitchener in 1911.

Through his daughter Frances, he was a grandfather of Philip Oxenden Papillon (1826–1899), an MP for Colchester who married Emily Caroline Garnier, third daughter of Thomas Garnier, in 1862.

Baronetage of England
Preceded by Henry Oxenden	Baronet (of Dene); 1803–1838	Succeeded by Henry Chudleigh Oxenden
