= Dorothy Gardiner =

British non-fiction writer and historian

- Born: Dorothy Kempe; 31 August 1873; London, England
- Died: 23 January 1957 (aged 83); Canterbury, Kent, England
- Occupations: Writer; Historian
- Spouse: Thory Gage Gardiner
- Parent(s): Sir John Arrow Kempe; Mary Jane, Lady Kempe
- Relatives: Sir Alfred Bray Kempe (uncle)

Dorothy Gardiner (née Kempe; 31 August 1873 – 23 January 1957) was a British non-fiction writer and historian.

== Life ==
Gardiner was born in London in 1873. Her parents were Mary Jane, Lady Kempe and Sir John Arrow Kempe, who served as Comptroller and Auditor General. Her uncles included the amateur mathematician Sir Alfred Bray Kempe and the electrical engineer Harry Robert Kempe.

She benefitted and was later aware of the improvements that had been made in the educational opportunities open to women. She was able to study English in Oxford at Lady Margaret Hall and gained a third class degree. Gardiner wrote poetry which was published in periodicals.

She wrote for the Early English Text Society, The Legend of the Holy Grail: Its Sources, Character and Development in 1905. In the following year she began working for the Society for the Propagation of the Gospel. She was the honorary secretary of their committee on women's work until 1910.

She decided to study the improvements that had been made in the educational opportunities open to women. She started ten years of work in about 1919. The resulting work published in 1929 was English Girlhood at School: A Study of Women's Education Through Twelve Centuries. She played down the effect of icons like Mary Wollstonecraft and the Blue Stockings. A 2013 view by Jackie Eales notes the work as solid but with outdated conclusions.

Gardiner's other works include A Social History of Sussex in 1912; Canterbury in 1923; Companion into Kent in 1934; The Oxinden Letters, 1607–1662 in 1933 and The Oxinden and Peyton Letters, 1642–1667 in 1937 were based on those of the 17th century poet Henry Oxenden. He was a collector of letters. Not just letters to himself but letters by people he knew.

== Private life ==
Gardiner married Thory Gage Gardiner when he was the Rector of Lambeth. He went on to be a residential canon of Canterbury Cathedral. They had no children.

Gardiner died at her home in 1957 in Canterbury. She had taken an interest in education as a Canterbury councillor, was a justice of the peace and chair of Canterbury Archaeological Society.
