= John Arrow Kempe =

Sir John Arrow Kempe, KCB (5 January 1846 – 4 April 1928) was a British civil servant.

== Biography ==
John Kempe was the son of the Rev. John Edward Kempe and grandson of Alfred John Kempe. A brother was Sir Alfred Kempe; another was Harry Robert Kempe.

Educated at St Paul's School and Trinity College, Cambridge, Kempe joined the Treasury in 1867. He was assistant private secretary to Benjamin Disraeli during his short premiership in 1868 and private secretary to Sir Stafford Northcote from 1874 until 1880. He later served as private secretary to Sir Ralph Lingen and Lord Frederick Cavendish.

He was principal clerk in the Treasury from 1888 to 1894, deputy chairman of the Board of Customs from 1894 to 1904, then briefly Assistant Comptroller, and finally Comptroller and Auditor-General from 1904 until his retirement in 1911.

== Family ==
A daughter was Dorothy Gardiner.
