= Basil Dixwell =

Basil Dixwell may refer to:

- Sir Basil Dixwell, 1st Baronet (1640–1668)
- Sir Basil Dixwell, 2nd Baronet (1665–1750), MP for Dover (UK Parliament constituency)
