= Gerald Aungier =

British Governor of Bombay

Gerald Aungier (1640 – 30 June 1677), of Anglo-Irish stock, was the 2nd British Governor of Bombay, and is often spoken of as the city's "founding father". As president of the English East India Company's factory in Surat, in 1669 he took control of the small territorial possession which had been ceded from Portugal to Britain at the time of the marriage of King Charles II to Catherine of Braganza, and laid the foundations of its development into a great city. During his tenure, the small town island of Bombay was converted into a promising hub for commerce. Great care was taken to bring the best traders, artisans and other professions to settle in Bombay. He is credited with adopting principles of religious tolerance, empowered local self-government, and a strong focus on commerce supported by the creation of courts and by enforcement through the formation of the local militia of Bhandari youth which evolved into the Bombay Police. By his leadership Aungier drew upon the experience of the English Plantations of Ireland, in which his grandfather, his father and brother were closely involved, carrying the interests of commerce and colonialism far afield in the wider formation of Empire.

He called Bombay "the city which by God's assistance is intended to be built".

== Origins and early life ==
Gerald Aungier was born in about 1640, the second son of the Hon. the Revd. Ambrose Aungier (1596–1654), Prebendary of St. Patrick's Cathedral, Dublin, and Grisel Bulkeley, daughter of Lancelot Bulkeley (1568–1650), the Protestant Archbishop of Dublin 1619–1650. Gerald was the grandson of Francis Aungier, 1st Baron Aungier of Longford, an Irish title created in 1621.

The Letters Patent by which the Barony of Longford, Ireland, was granted to Francis Aungier in 1621 by King James I refers to his origins as being "ex antiquissima familia Comitum Aungier in regno Franciae oriundus..." (arisen from the extremely ancient family of the Counts Aungier in the Kingdom of France). However this was no recent arrival. Richard Aungier (father of the 1st Baron), an original Fellow of Trinity College, Cambridge in 1547, was admitted a lawyer to Gray's Inn in 1551 (during the reign of King Edward VI), and by 1558 was married and an established landowner seated very near the city of Cambridge. Richard became a senior member of Gray's Inn, and his son (who became the 1st Baron) was admitted in 1577. The Heraldic visitations of Cambridgeshire show three generations before Richard, being as "of Cambridge".

Gerald's grandfather Francis Aungier became closely involved in Irish affairs through his stewardship of estates near Woking, Surrey, belonging to Elizabeth FitzGerald, Countess of Lincoln. In 1584, at Rushbrooke, West Suffolk, he married Douglas, sister of Gerald FitzGerald, 14th Earl of Kildare, and in 1588 received lands in Surrey in the Countess's will. Their children were mostly christened at East Clandon, Surrey, during the 1590s, the eldest son being Gerald (1595–1655), a highly educated man settled in Surrey who became heir to the Barony of Longford in 1632, and the second son being Ambrose (1596–1654), who was named at the font by Sir Ambrose Coppinger, husband of his mother's sister Lettice FitzGerald. Like his father before him, Ambrose was a royal Scholar at Westminster School and took his degree at Trinity College, Cambridge (Scholar 1614, BA 1617/18), being made a Fellow of Clare College, Cambridge in 1620 (graduating MA 1621). Choosing a religious career, he was first ordained deacon and priest in the Anglican Diocese of Peterborough in 1624.

Meanwhile, from 1609 until 1632 Ambrose's father (Sir) Francis (a leading lawyer) occupied the high office of Master of the Rolls in Ireland, and member of the Privy Council of Ireland under the Lords Justices and their Deputies, with residences in Longford and at the former Whitefriars in Dublin. Ambrose therefore followed the path to Ireland, becoming Prebendary of St Patrick's Cathedral, Dublin, in 1629, being Treasurer thereof, 1628–1632, and for 18 years (from 1636) Chancellor of Dublin Cathedral. Before 1632 he married the Archbishop's daughter Griseld Bulkeley, naming their eldest son Frances (who became heir to the Barony of Longford in 1655, and later the 1st Earl), and the second son Gerald (the future Governor of Bombay), born c. 1640. There was also a third son, Ambrose (eventually the 2nd Earl), and two daughters, Douglas and Alice Aungier. All these children were probably born in Dublin, belonging to a prominent class of the Anglo-Irish administration.

Little is known of Aungier's early years in India, much less of his childhood and youth in England. In all likelihood he trained in England and must have had a fairly good education, evidenced by the countless letters he wrote to his masters in England and his subordinates in Bombay which display an extensive and wholesome reading.

== Career ==
Like Sir George Oxenden (governor), Aungier entered the service of the British East India Company at an early age and rose in rank step by step. He was appointed as a Factor for Surat in November 1661, and by 1663 he occupied the post of warehouse keeper at Surat. He was deputed by the Surat factory to accompany the Earl of Marlborough when the latter claimed the town and island of Bombay in 1662 on behalf of the King of Great Britain.

On the death of Sir George Oxenden on 14 July 1669, Aungier became the President of the Surat factory, a post which then carried with it the governorship of the port and island of Bombay.

== Relationship with native powers ==
Aungier was also at the helm in Surat on 3 October 1670 when Shivaji invaded Surat. He secured the British settlement and saved the lives and property within their fortifications.

He showed great wisdom in managing both Mughal and Maratha aggressions. His constant reply to both was that the British were merchants and cannot take one side or the other. He sent envoys to Shivaji thrice and made treaties with Shivaji. His ambassadors were present at Shivaji's coronation.

== Governorship of Bombay ==
Aungier embarked at Surat on 11 January 1670 and arrived in Bombay a few days later. The town was rife with many allegations of improprieties against Deputy Governor Captain Henry Young, and Aungier's immediate task was to investigate these allegations. He immediately set about defining the rules and regulations based on which Bombay must be governed and without which other reforms would be useless. Learning from the incessant perils of wars and tyranny being faced by traders in Surat, his first idea was that the city needed absolute peace and security. He therefore set out to set up the courts of Judicature and strengthening the fortifications of Bombay. He also initiated a survey of Bombay with a view of ascertaining the island's total land revenue. Although this trip lasted just under a month, it had set the foundations for future work.

1671 found Aungier frustrated as he was stranded at Surat, first by the disturbances/delays created by the Mughal Governor and later by the advent of Shivaji. This strengthened his resolve to move the seat of government from Surat to Bombay, a suggestion that was finally implemented after his death in 1687.

The revenue survey of Bombay indicated that the cost of upkeep far exceeded the revenues collected. Aungier implemented a set of measures that would encourage commerce at one end and improve tax collections on the other. He placed very high importance in the justice system being credible that would give confidence to all those residing on the island. He felt the European system may not meet the demands of Indian natives.

=== Setting up Panchayats ===
Realising the importance of being able to attract the wealthy traders and merchants from Surat to Bombay, he set up Panchayats based on each community, something that expanded access of justice and governance to not only the wealthy but also the poorest within each community. This one master stroke, created healthy competition amongst communities and ensured proper law and order as each Panchayat became responsible for their community's conduct.

=== Property titles ===
While ceding Bombay to the British, the local Portuguese government did everything in its power to make the transition difficult. One such measure was to declare that most of the lands of any value was the property of private individuals and hence could not be ceded to the crown or company. Aungier created an amicable settlement on property titles by arranging residents to pay annual quit rents in lieu of better administration.

=== Acquisition of Colaba and Old Woman Island ===
Aungier negotiated the acquisition of the islands of Colaba and Old Woman from the Portuguese

=== Company patent to Neema Parrack ===
Neema Parrack was a reputed Banya trader based in Diu, who presented certain conditions before moving to Bombay. He demanded a patent under the seal of the company that secured him and his community the right of practicing their religion not only to themselves but in perpetuity to their descendants. Though instances of religious toleration by rulers abound in medieval Indian history, this may be one of the first instances of a government granting a patent guaranteeing religious toleration. The patent was granted by Aungier on 22 March 1677.

=== Making Bombay the seat of British presidency in Western India ===
Aungier proposed the shifting of Presidency of West India to Bombay, something that finally took effect many years after his death on 2 May 1687

=== Bhandari Militia ===
Aungier engaged the services of around 600 Bhandari Militia men who were maintained by 100 of the principal landowners of the island. He organized the Bhandari Militia with Subhedars headquartered at Mahim, Sewree and Sion.

=== Establishment of the Mint ===
An event which attracted the wealthy trader population was the establishment of a Mint in 1676 for the coinage of "rupees, pies and bujurks". Tavernier who reported in 1678 that the currency was circulated within the fort precincts and some two or three leagues in the country.

=== First execution in Bombay under British law ===
Aungier was called in 1674 to quell a mutiny by English soldiers, and the first execution by British law as far as we can learn in Bombay was ordered by him. The execution took place on 21 October 1674 when Corporal Fake was shot.

== Accomplishments and legacy ==
After the Portuguese king had ceded all the islands of Bombay to king Charles II of England, the Portuguese in India at first refused to hand over the territory. In 1675 Aungier took Colaba and Old Woman's Island, completing the transfer of power to the British. His plan of fortifying the main island, from Dongri in the north to the harbour, was completed in 1715, when Charles Boone became the governor of the town.

He offered inducements which brought skilled workers and traders to Bombay, including many traders and artisans from Gujarat. Between 1661 and 1675 Bombay's population increased sixfold.

Aungier ceded land near the Malabar Hill to immigrant Parsi workers and traders for a Tower of Silence. During his governorship, in 1670, the first printing press was imported and set up in Bombay.

Bombay's population was around 10,000 people when Aungier took power and grew to 80,000 by the time of his death eight years later. The revenue had grown from GBP 2,823 to GBP 9,254.

While Aungier was governor the foundation stone of St. Thomas Church was laid. It is now a diocesan cathedral and has a silver chalice Aungier gave to the Anglican Christian community in 1675.

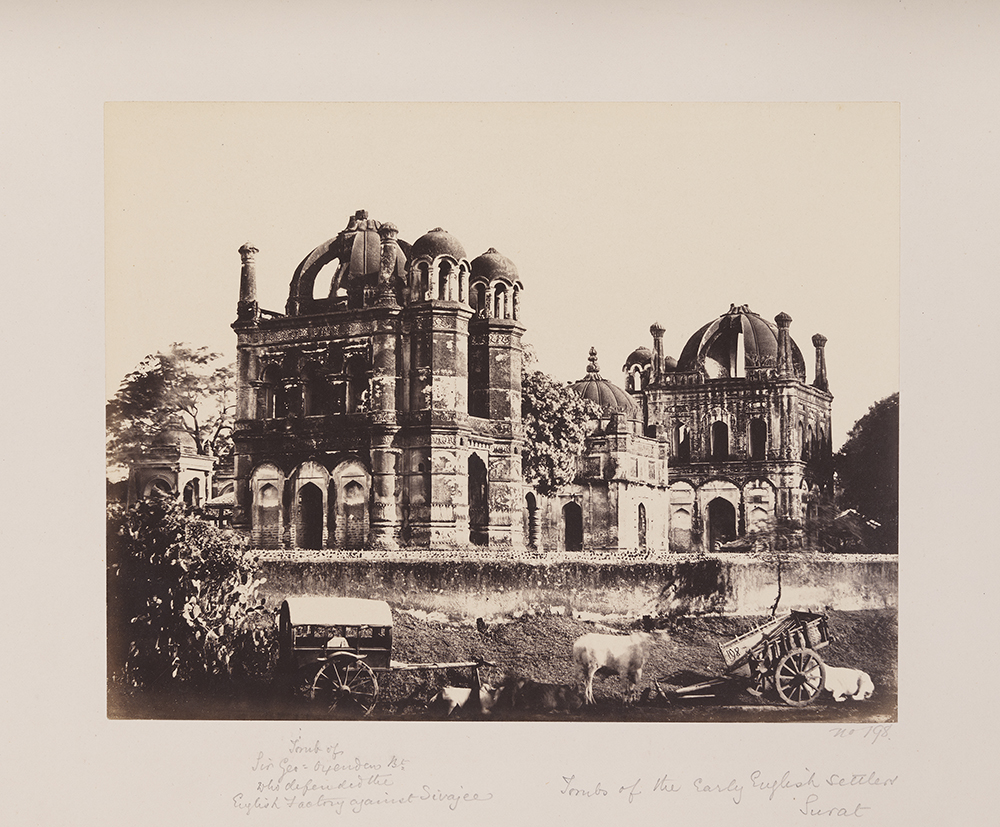
Aungier's tomb in the English Cemetery at Surat.

Aungier died in Surat on 30 June 1677. His tomb is near that of Sir George Oxenden. His grave was unmarked for many years and after it was identified a tablet was set up on orders of Lord Curzon in 1916.

Government offices
Preceded by George Oxenden (governor)	Governor of Bombay; 14 July 1669 - 30 June 1677	Succeeded by Sir Henry Oxenden, 3rd Baronet
