= George Oxenden (lawyer) =

English academic, lawyer and politician

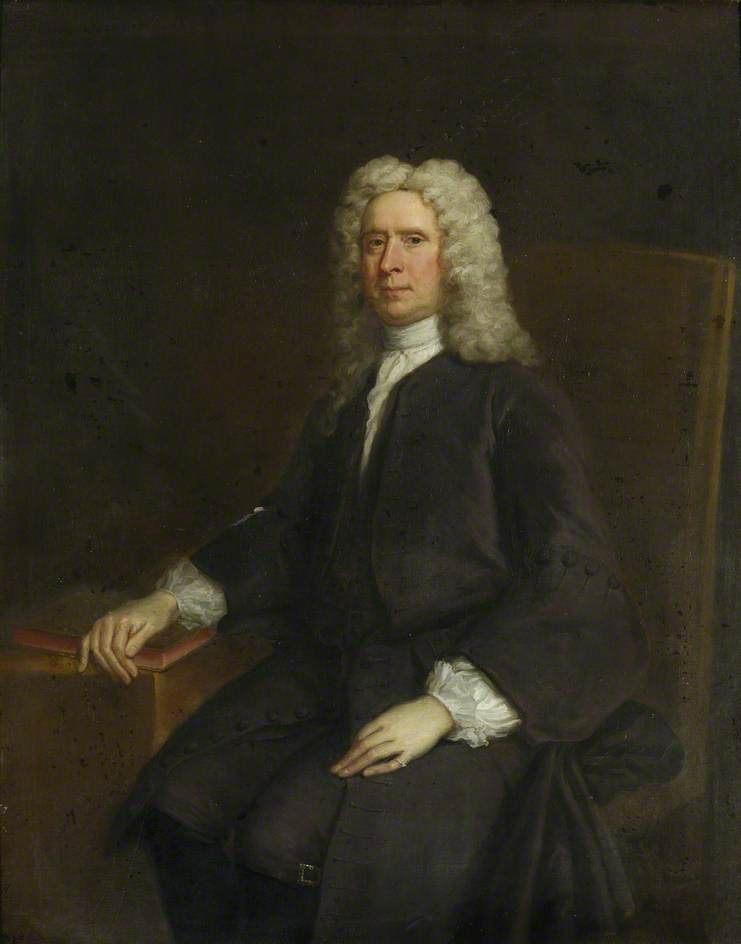
- Born: October 1651
- Died: 21 February 1703 (aged 51) London, England
- Resting place: Wingham, Kent, England
- Occupation: lawyer; politician; academic; professor; vicar-general; judge
- Education: Cambridge
- Spouse: Elizabeth Dixwell

George Oxenden (October 1651 – 21 February 1703) was an English academic, lawyer and politician who sat in the House of Commons from 1695 to 1698.

Oxenden was the son of Sir Henry Oxenden, 1st Baronet of Deane, Kent and his second wife Elizabeth Merideth, daughter of Sir William Meredith, 1st Baronet. He was admitted at Trinity Hall, Cambridge as a scholar on 8 July 1667 becoming a Fellow in 1671 and being awarded LLB in 1673, MA in 1675 and LLD in 1679. He was incorporated at Oxford University in 1674 and entered Doctor's Commons in 1679. In 1684 he became Regius Professor of Civil Law at Cambridge. He became Master of Trinity Hall in 1689. He also became vicar-general to the Archbishop of Canterbury and Dean of Arches and a judge of the Admiralty in 1689. He was one of the commissioners for the rebuilding of St Paul's Cathedral from 1692 and Vice-Chancellor of the University of Cambridge for 1692–1693.

In 1695 Oxenden was elected as Member of Parliament for Cambridge University and held the seat until 1698 when he stood unsuccessfully.

Oxenden died at his house in Doctors' Commons and was buried in the family vault at Wingham.

Oxenden married Elizabeth Dixwell, daughter of Sir Basil Dixwell, 1st Baronet around 1700. Elizabeth was a Maid of Honour to Queen Mary. His sons, Henry and George, succeeded successively to the Oxenden baronetcy.

Parliament of England
Preceded by Edward Finch; Henry Boyle	Member of Parliament for Cambridge University; 1695–1698; With: Henry Boyle	Succeeded by Anthony Hammond; Henry Boyle
Academic offices
Preceded by Thomas Exton	Master of Trinity Hall, Cambridge; 1688–1702	Succeeded by George Bramston
