= Kempe's Engineers Year-Book =

Engineering yearbook published in the United Kingdom, (1894 - 2002)

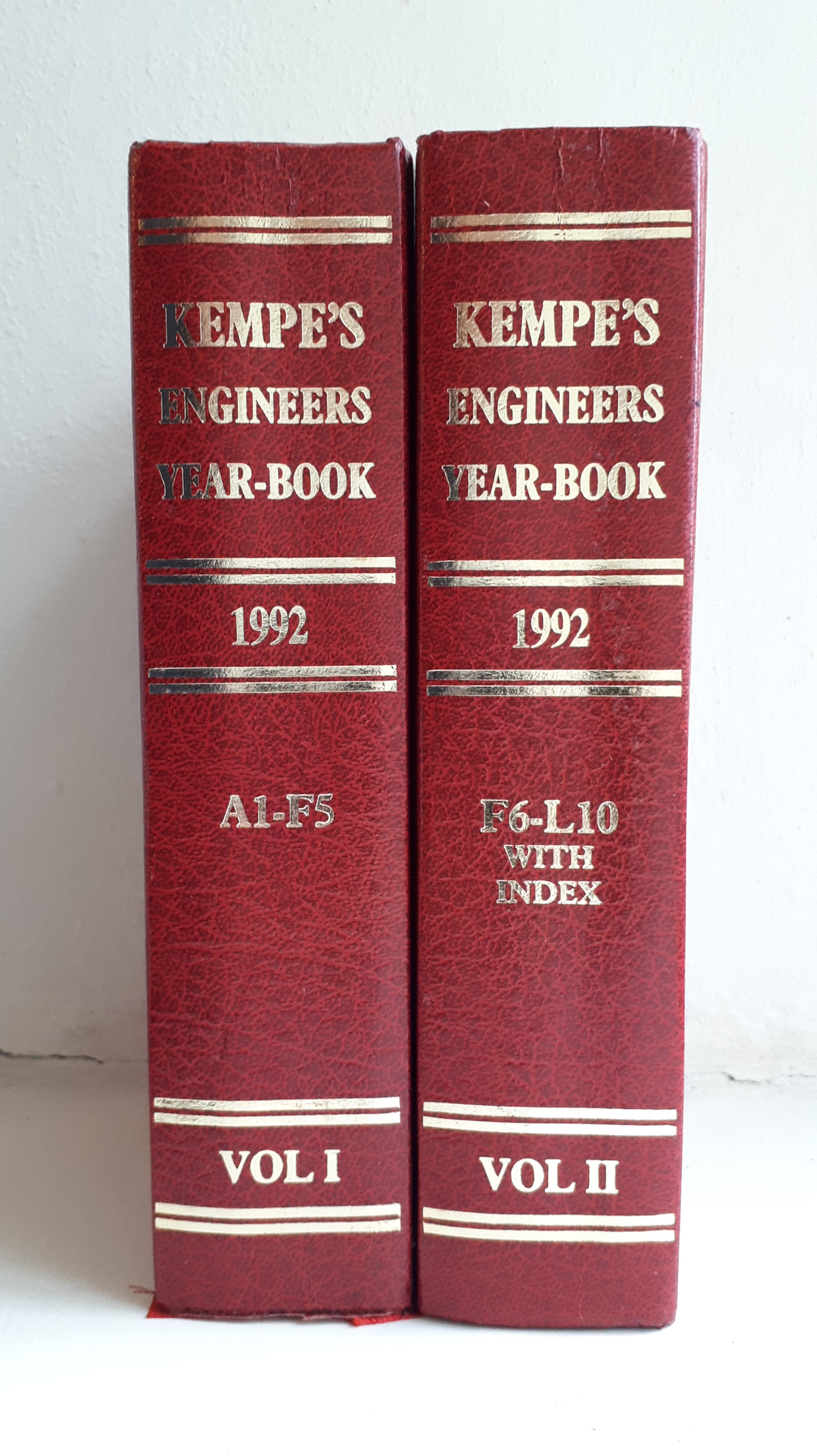
- Two volume 1992 edition of Kempe's Engineers Year-Book.
- Editor: H. R. Kempe (1852-1935)
- Language: English
- Subject: Engineering
- Genre: Reference work; Yearbook
- Publisher: Morgan-Grampian Ltd.
- Publication place: United Kingdom

Kempe's Engineers Year Book was for many years a standard reference work of practical engineering information in the United Kingdom, covering a wide range of subjects.

== History ==
First published in 1894 by H. R. Kempe with W. Hannaford-Smith and then published annually, except during World War II, until 2002, the book was a standard source of reference for civil, mechanical, electrical, marine, mining, and other engineers.

== See also ==
- Machinery's Handbook
