= Sir Percy Dixwell-Oxenden, 10th Baronet =

English baronet (1838–1924)

Sir Percy Dixwell-Oxenden Bt JP
- Born: Percy Dixwell Nowell Oxenden; 6 June 1838; Ashford, Kent
- Died: 12 July 1924 (aged 86); Burnham-on-Crouch, Essex
- Spouse: Isabella Finch-Hatton (m. 1868; died 1924)
- Children: 3
- Parent(s): Montagu Oxenden; Elizabeth Wilson
- Relatives: Sir Henry Oxenden, 7th Baronet (grandfather); Philip Oxenden Papillon (cousin)

Sir Percy Dixwell Nowell Dixwell-Oxenden, 10th Baronet JP (6 June 1838 – 12 July 1924) was an English baronet, magistrate and Captain in the Royal East Kent Mounted Yeomanry. He was the last member of his family to own the Broome Park estate, which he sold to Earl Kitchener in 1911.

== Early life ==
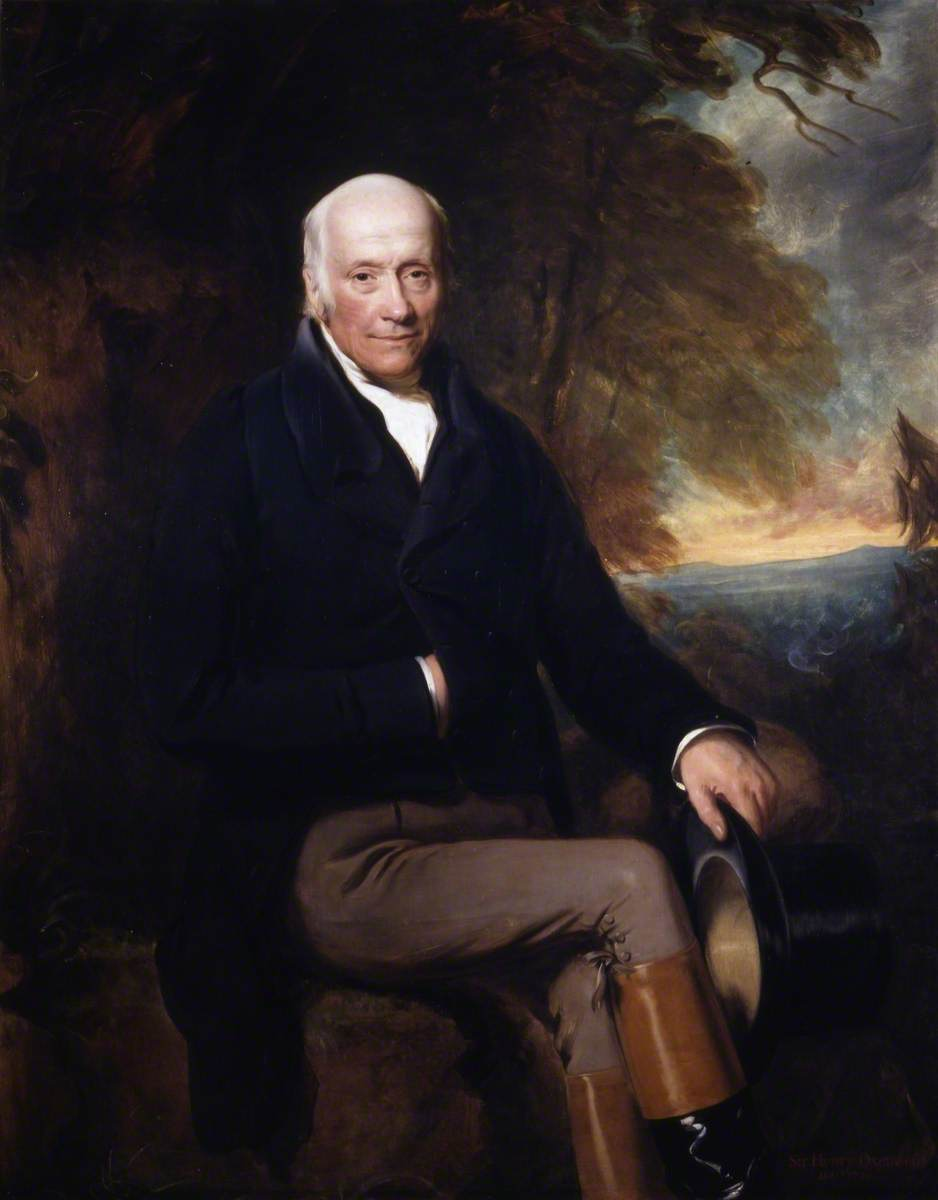
Portrait of his grandfather, Sir Henry Oxenden, Bt, by James Godsell Middleton

Percy was born on 6 June 1838 at Eastwell Rectory, Ashford, Kent. He was a son of the Rev. Montagu Oxenden (1799–1880), the Rector of Eastwell and Luddenham, and Elizabeth Wilson (a daughter of Robert Wilson). After his mother's death in 1862, his father married Elizabeth, widow of James Marjoribanks of Sandgate, in 1869. His elder brother was Sir Henry Montagu Oxenden, 9th Baronet.

His paternal grandparents were Sir Henry Oxenden, 7th Baronet and the former Mary Graham (the daughter of Col. John Graham, of St. Lawrence House, near Canterbury; former Lieutenant governor of Georgia).

Percy matriculated at the University of Oxford on 15 October 1856 aged 18.

== Career ==
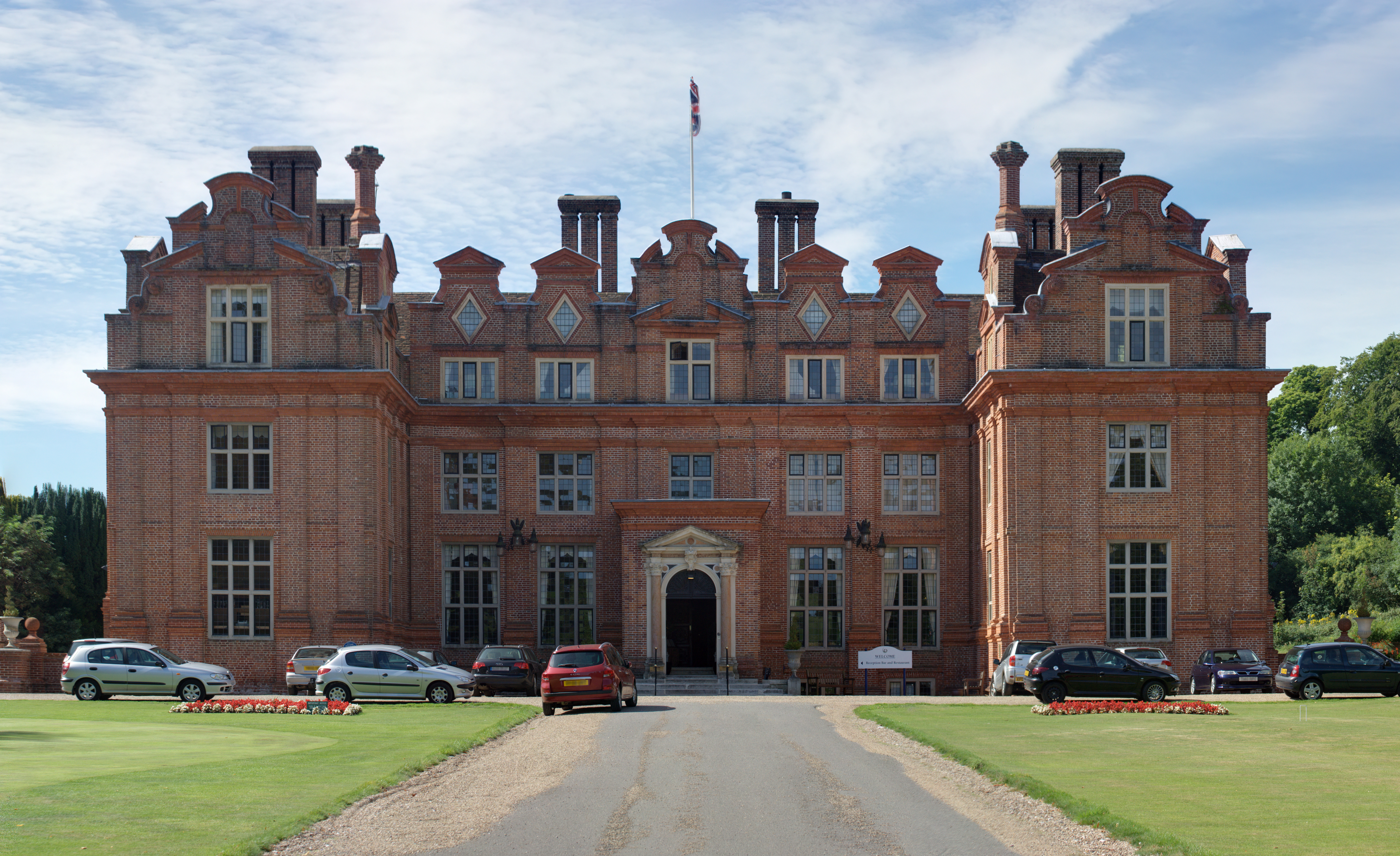
Broome Park principal facade

In 1890, Percy assumed the prefix surname of Dixwell. He was a Justice of the Peace for Kent. He was a member of the St James's Club in London.

Upon the death of his elder brother in 1895, he succeeded as the 10th Baronet Oxenden and inherited the family seat, Broome Park in Kent. His brother had succeeded their uncle, Sir Henry Oxenden, 8th Baronet, who died without issue. He was a Captain of the Royal East Kent Yeoman Cavalry.

Sir Percy sold the Broome Park estate to Herbert Kitchener, 1st Earl Kitchener in 1911. The well known Oxenden Collection was passed down to his children, including his daughter Muriel, Lady Capel Cure, who held a large sale of works from Broome Park in Barham, Kent in 1931. Thereafter they lived at Craigmore in Leigh-on-Sea, Essex.

== Personal life ==
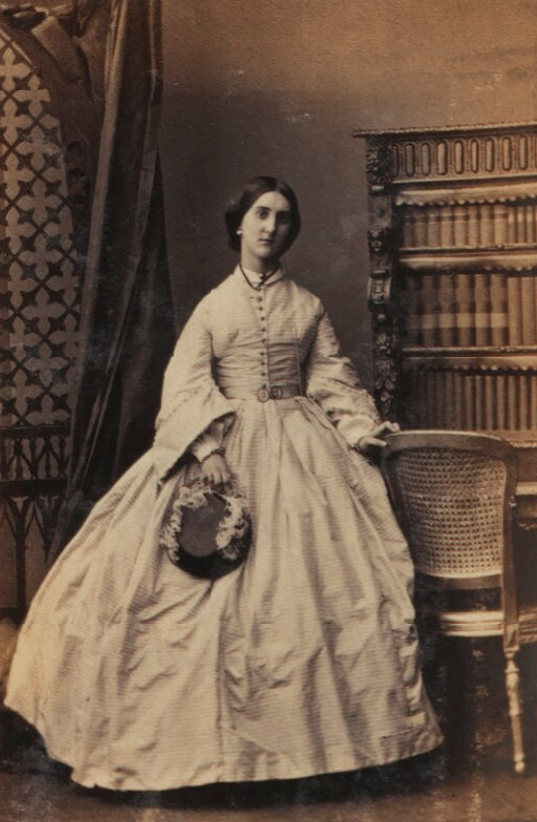
Photograph of his wife, Isabella Finch-Hatton, by Camille Silvy, 1861

On 26 November 1868, Percy married Isabella Finch-Hatton (1845–1927), youngest daughter of The Hon. Rev. Daniel Heneage Finch-Hatton, the Chaplain in Ordinary to Queen Victoria and Rector of Weldon, Northamptonshire, and Louisa Greville (a daughter of Hon. Robert Fulke Greville and Louisa, 2nd Countess of Mansfield). Her brother, the Rev. William Robert Finch-Hatton, married Percy's sister, Agnes Graham Oxenden. Together, they were the parents of:

- Muriel Elizabeth Anna Louisa Dixwell-Oxenden (1869–1968), who married Sir Edward Henry Capel Cure, son of the Rev. Edward Cure and Gertrude Louisa Jane Selwin (daughter of Sir John Thomas Selwin-Ibbetson, 6th Baronet and sister to Henry Selwin-Ibbetson, 1st Baron Rookwood), in 1889.
- Basil Heneage Dixwell-Oxenden (1874–1919), who served in the Second Boer War from 1900 to 1902; he died unmarried.
- Gwendoline Isobel Dixwell-Oxenden (1880–1960), who married Commander Percy Frederick Griffiths of the Royal Navy, son of J. H. F. Griffifths of The Grove, Whitchurch, Cardiff, in 1906.

After a bout of bronchitis, Sir Percy died on 12 July 1924 at F. J. Handley's bungalow on Ship Road in Burnham-on-Crouch. After a service at St Mary's Church, he was buried at St Mary the Virgin Churchyard in Wingham, Kent. As he was predeceased by his only son, the baronetcy, created in May 1678 for Henry Oxenden, became extinct upon his death.

Baronetage of England
Preceded by Henry Montagu Oxenden	Baronet (of Dene); 1895–1924	Extinct
