= Banister Fletcher =

English architect and architectural historian

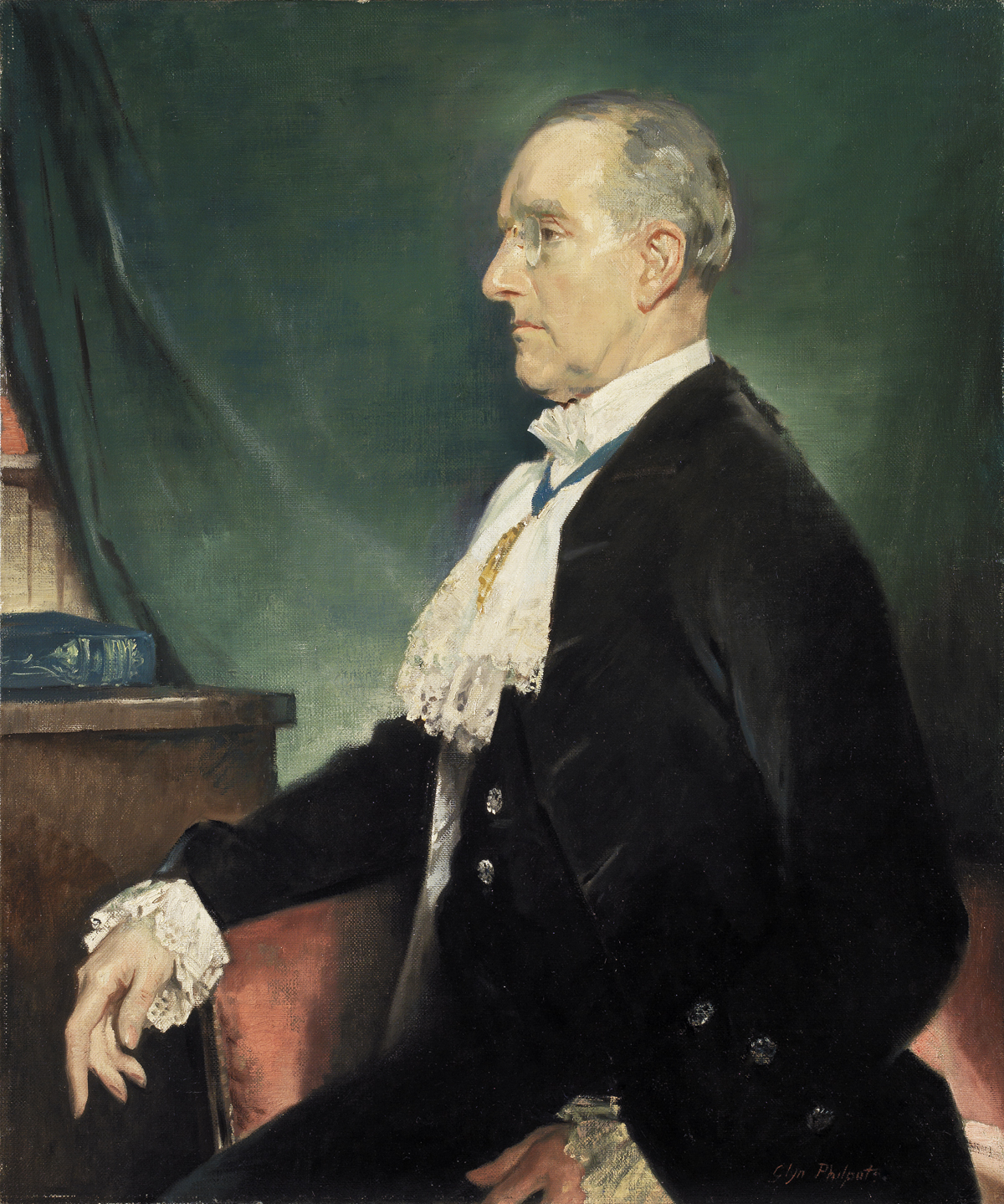
Sir Banister Fletcher, 1931, by Glyn Philpot

Sir Banister Flight Fletcher (15 February 1866 – 17 August 1953) was an English architect and architectural historian, as was his father, also named Banister Fletcher. They wrote the standard textbook A History of Architecture, which is also often referred to just as Banister Fletcher.

== Life ==
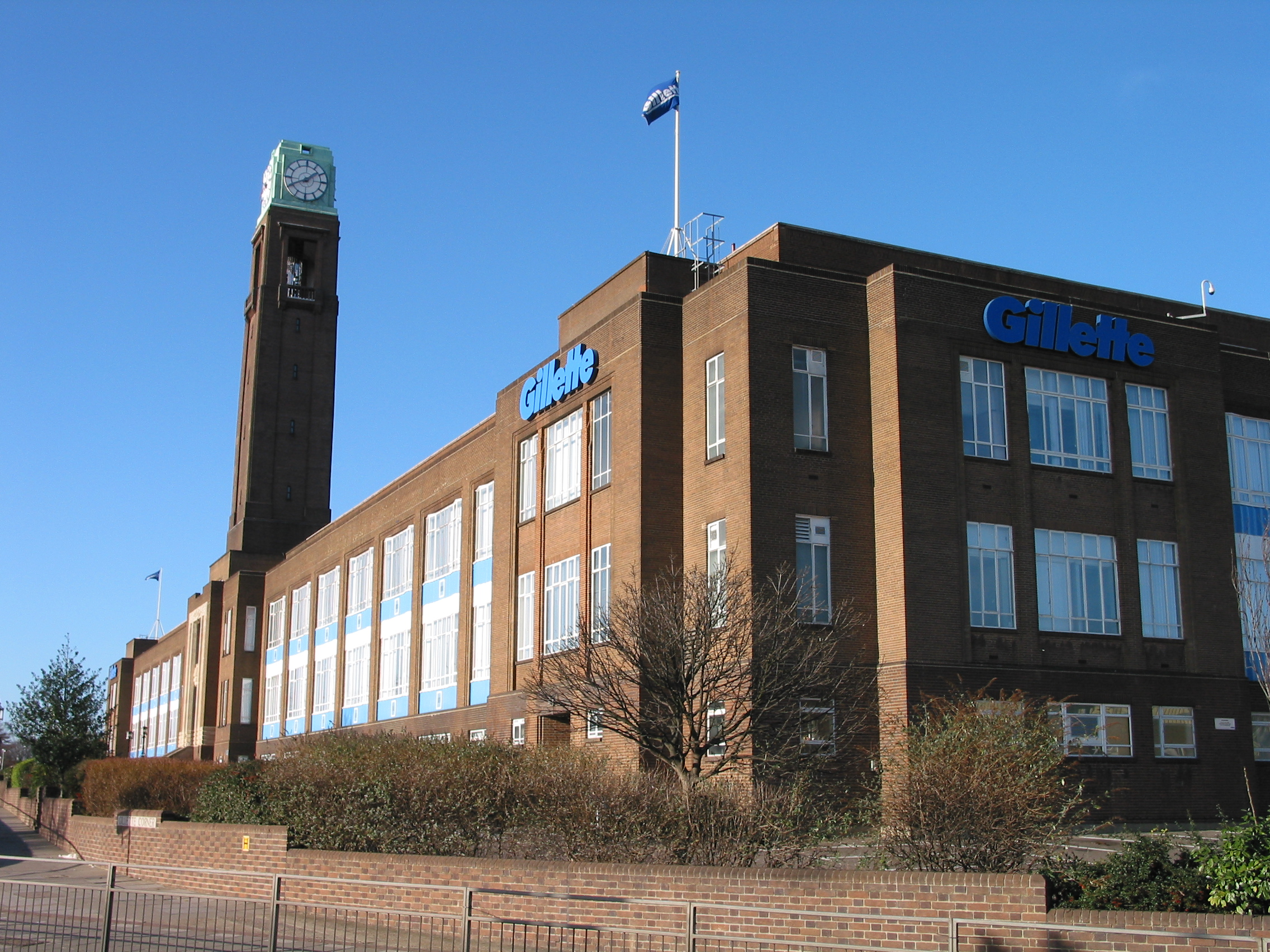
The Gillette Factory on the Great West Road, Brentford, Middlesex. Architect: Sir Banister Fletcher. Built/opened in 1936/7

Fletcher was born in London, where he trained at King's College and University College. He joined his father's practice in 1884, also studying at the Royal Academy Schools, the Architectural Association, and the École des Beaux-Arts, Paris. He became a partner in 1889, and on his father's death in 1899 took over the practice, which continued to be called Banister Fletcher & Sons. Fletcher worked closely with his younger brother Herbert Phillips Fletcher (1872–1916) as well as his father. Herbert was also a partner in the family firm and they wrote some books together. He was "regarded as a minor figure in the modernist movement" in his early career, and generally preferred to write rather than design.

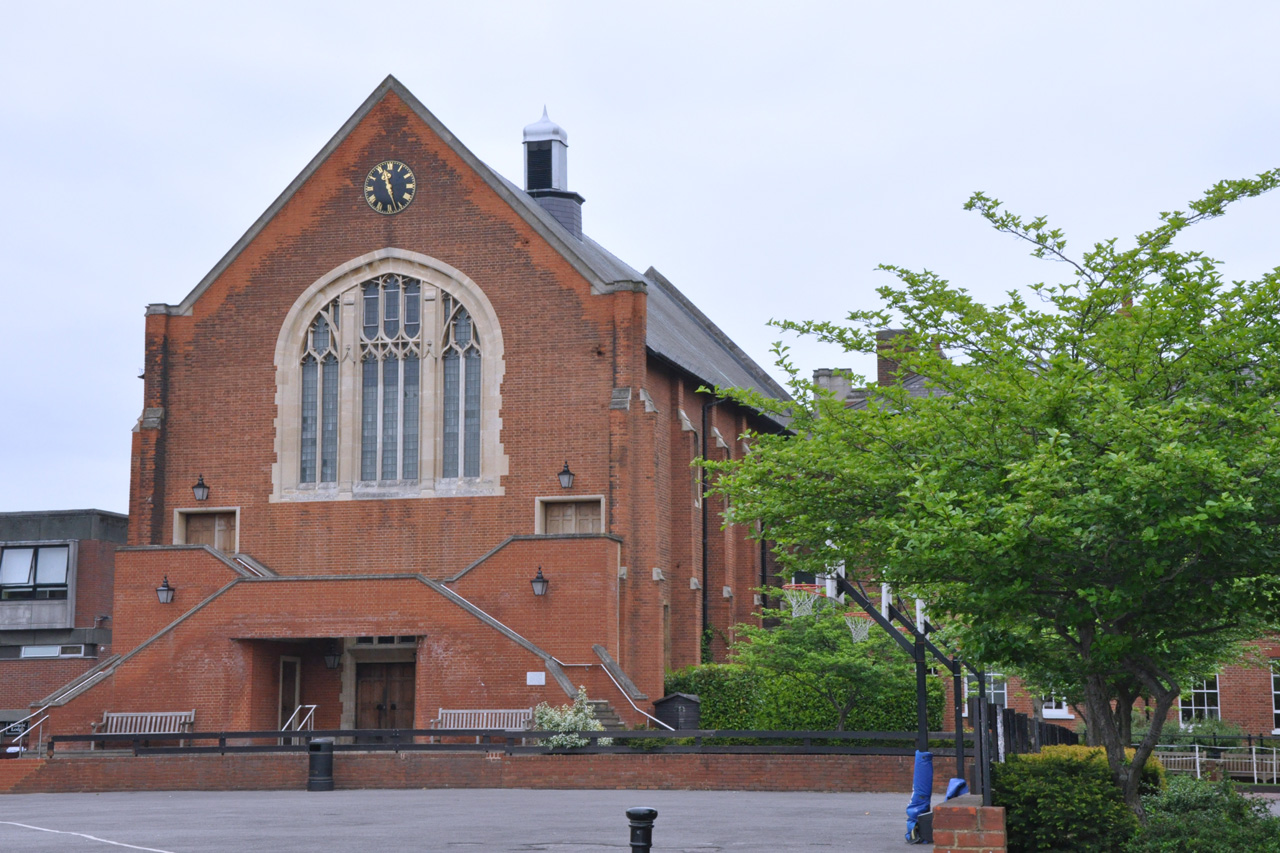
Great Hall at King's College School, Wimbledon

Banister's work as an architect included:

- the Gillette factory on the Great West Road, in Brentford, Middlesex
- The John Roan School (Maze Hill site), Greenwich
- the Great Hall at King's College School, Wimbledon
- Abbess Grange, Leckford, Hampshire

In 1908 he qualified as a barrister at the Inner Temple, and undertook arbitrations and advice on property matters.

He was knighted in 1919 and elected president of the Royal Institute of British Architects (RIBA) in 1929 (until 1931). Fletcher was surveyor to the Worshipful Company of Carpenters, and became Master in 1936, a position also held by his father.

He married twice, first, in 1914, to Alice Bretherton (d.1932) and again in 1933 to Mary Louise Hazell. He had no children. Fletcher died in London in 1953.

== A History of Architecture ==
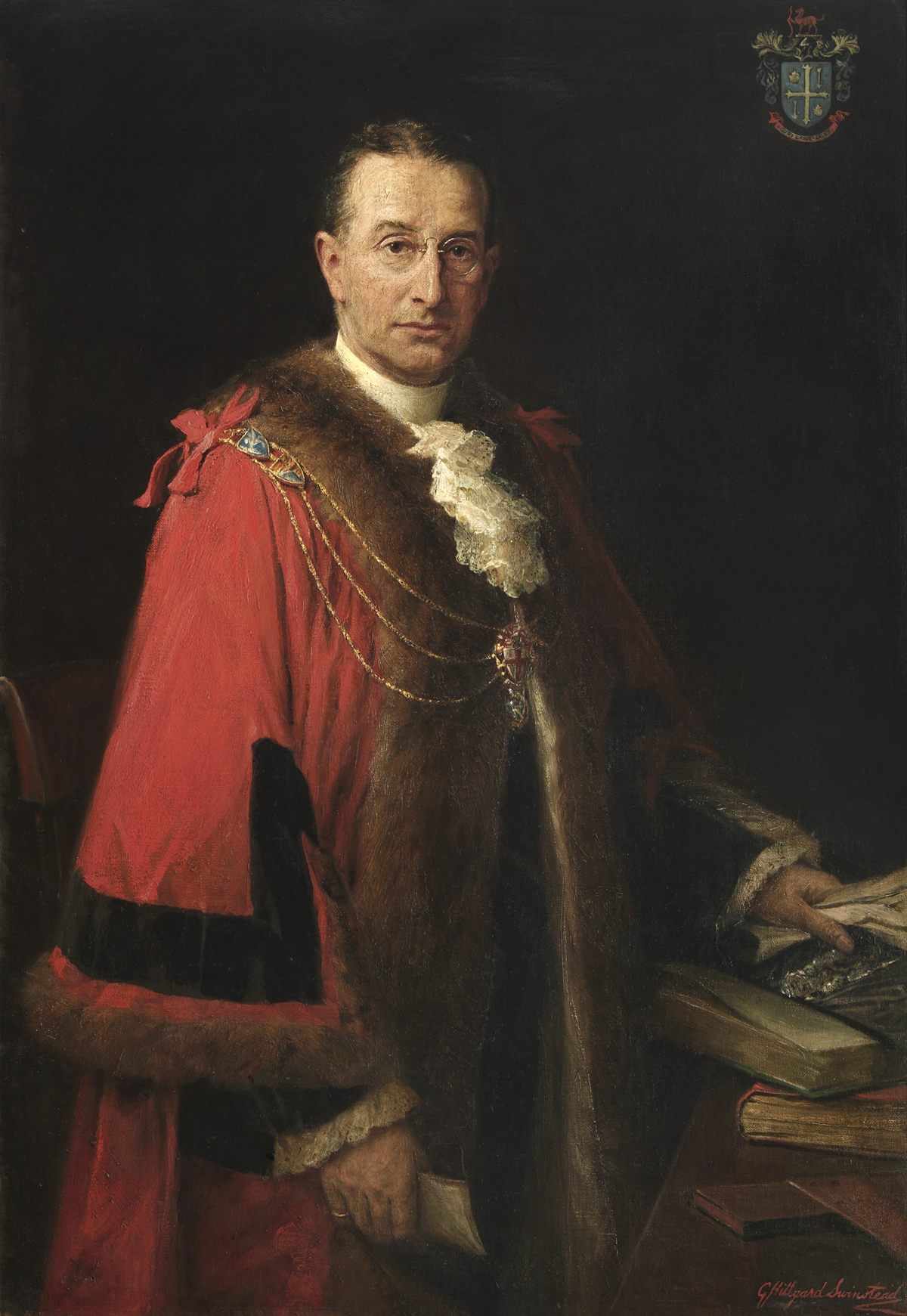
George Hillyard Swinstead; Sir Banister Fletcher (1866-1953), PRIBA, ca. 1919

Banister Fletcher and his father wrote the first edition of A History of Architecture on the Comparative Method, published in 1896. This became a standard reference work, with updated editions published throughout the 20th century.

There was a major revision with the 6th edition in 1921, when much of the text was rewritten by Fletcher and his first wife, Alice Bretherton. This was over twenty years after his father's death, and for this edition his father's name was dropped, and the very numerous drawings replaced by new ones by George G. Woodward and others. According to J. Mordaunt Crook this edition concentrated 'on supplying an epitomised history of world architecture' such that 'Fletcher turned a useful handbook into a veritable student's bible.' Fletcher produced the sixteenth edition shortly before his death in 1953.

The 21st edition was published in 2019, edited by Murray Fraser and Catherine Gregg, under the sponsorship of the RIBA. Retitled as Sir Banister Fletcher's Global History of Architecture, it aims to correct the historical western centric imbalance of the content, which has been tackled by earlier editions, but not eradicated. The RIBA claims that the expanded edition, written by 88 experts from around the world, represents the most comprehensive survey of global architecture to date.

== The Tree of Architecture ==
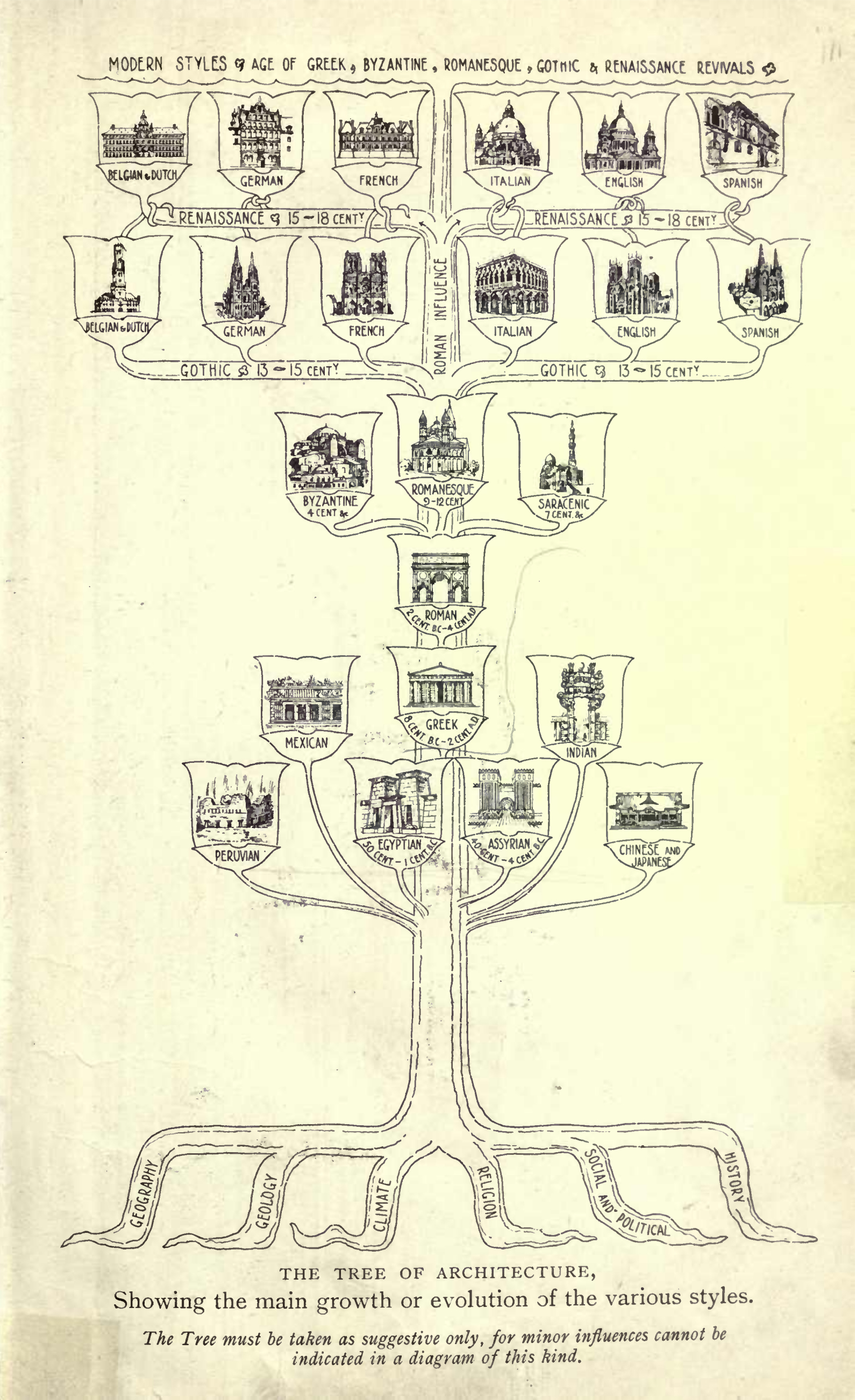
Banister Fletcher's A Tree of Architecture, 1901

Banister Fletcher's "The Tree of Architecture" is a schematic diagram detailing what Fletcher identified as the "branches" of architectural style beginning with five periods (Peruvian, Egyptian, Greek, Assyrian, and Chinese and Japanese) and culminating in the Modern American style. Initially published as a frontispiece in the first edition of Fletcher's A History of Architecture on the Comparative Method for the Student, Craftsman, and Amateur in 1896, the schematic was reproduced in each subsequent edition of the publication. Fletcher suggests a cross-cultural and historical evolution of architectural styles through a series of successive branches, some of which terminate prior to the Modern period including Mexican and Indian, while other lineages can be traced through multiple generations into the final apex of Modern style. Recent scholarship has been critical of Fletcher's hierarchical emphasis on the primacy of Western European architectural traditions.

== Legacy ==
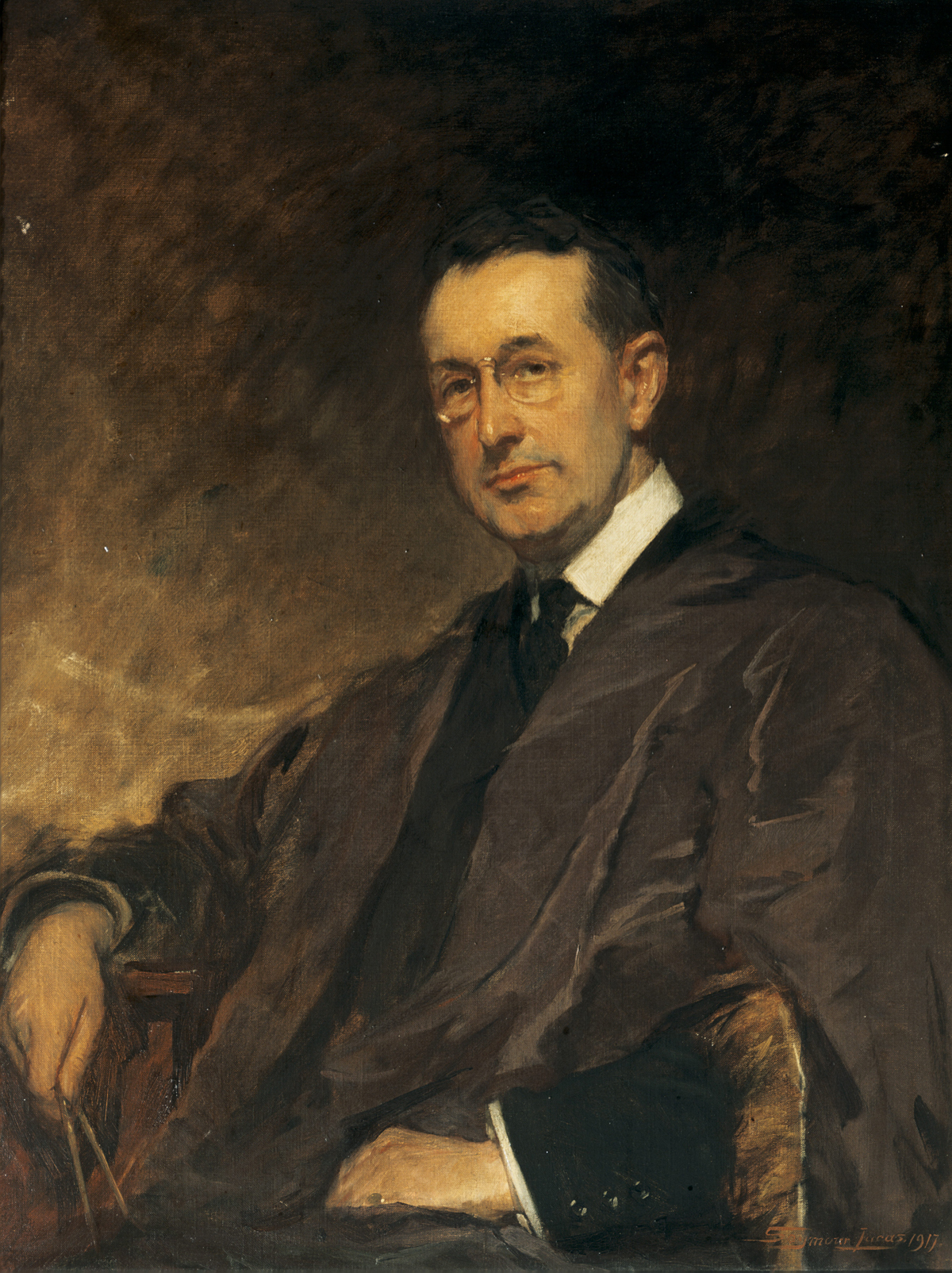
John Seymour Lucas; Sir Banister Fletcher, FSA, 1917

- In his will, he left a bequest to the Bartlett School of Architecture inaugurating an annual prize, the Sir Banister Fletcher Prize and Medal, in memory of his father, brother and himself.
- In his will, he left a bequest to the London Society to hold an annual lecture in his name.
- The Authors' Club, of which Fletcher was president, presents an annual Banister Fletcher Award for the best book on art or architecture.
- He was an amateur photographer. Examples of his work can be found in the Conway Library of Architecture in the Courtauld Institute Courtauld Institute of Art.

== Collections ==
University College London holds the Fletcher Lectures archive, a collection of material relating to the lecture series given in Fletcher's name.

== Selected other works ==
- Fletcher, Banister, Recent development of early renaissance in England, London : C.W. Sweet, 1894
- Andrea Palladio (1902), which was not well received by critics.
- Fletcher, Banister F; Fletcher, H Phillips, Architectural Hygiene; Or, Sanitary Science as Applied to Buildings, London : D. Fourdrinier, 1902
- Fletcher, Banister; Fletcher, Sir Banister; Fletcher, Herbert Phillips, Arbitrations: a text-book for arbitrators, umpires & all connected with arbitrations, more especially architects, engineers and surveyors in tabulated form, with the chief cases governing the same, and an appendix of forms, statutes, rules, etc., London : B.T. Batsford, 1904
- Architectural Works (1934) with William Hanneford-Smith
