= Harry Robert Kempe =

English engineer and author (1852–1935)

Harry Robert Kempe MICE, MIMechE, MIEE
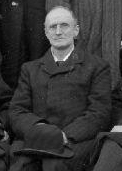
- H. R. Kempe, 1907
- Born: 1 March 1852; Kensington, London, England
- Died: 10 April 1935 (aged 83); Brockham, Surrey, England
- Education: King's College London
- Known for: Electrician to the General Post Office, London
- Spouse: Helen Catherine Kempe
- Parent(s): Rev. John Edward Kempe and Harriet Kempe

Harry Robert Kempe (1 March 1852 – 10 April 1935) was an English electrical engineer, author and editor.

== Life ==
Kempe was born at Kensington, London, on 1 March 1852, the youngest son of the Rev. John Edward Kempe, later rector of St James's Church, Piccadilly, and his wife Harriet (née Wood). An older brother was Sir Alfred Bray Kempe, a barrister and mathematician. Another older brother was the civil servant Sir John Arrow Kempe. On 8 July 1880, he married Helen Catherine. They had one daughter. Kempe lived for many years at Brockham, Surrey. He died on 10 April 1935 and is buried at Brockham church.

== Education and career ==
Kempe was educated at Westminster School and then studied applied science at King's College London from 1867 to 1870, followed by two years in the laboratory of Sir Charles Wheatstone and then three years with Sir Samuel Canning, engineer-in-chief of the Telegraph Construction and Maintenance Company, where he was involved with the laying of the Malta to Gibraltar telegraph cable in 1870.

In 1871 he was among the first associate members of the Society of Telegraph Engineers, which later became the Institution of Electrical Engineers. In 1872 Kempe moved to Southampton to work with William Henry Preece, divisional engineer with the postal telegraph. In 1877 Preece was appointed electrician to the Postmaster-General and in 1878 Kempe was transferred to London to act as his assistant.

During the 1890s Kempe was responsible for many telegraph and telephone services used by the General Post Office (GPO). He succeeded Preece, becoming in 1900 Principal Staff Engineer and in 1907 Electrician to the Post Office. In the GPO Kempe was well liked by his colleagues, a tribute to him on his retirement describes his outstanding characteristic as a "quality of loveableness". He retired on 31 December 1912. During World War I he was examiner to the inventions committee of the Air Ministry.

He was an accredited member of the Institution of Civil Engineers, the Institution of Mechanical Engineers and the Institution of Electrical Engineers.

== Bibliography ==
- From 1872 he contributed to the Telegraphic Journal (later becoming the Electrical Review), of which he became the editor and one of the proprietors until 1931.
- He contributed articles to the 11th edition of Encyclopaedia Britannica.
- A Handbook of Electrical Testing (1876)
- The Electrical Engineer's Pocket-Book (1890)
- Kempe's Engineers Year-Book, 1894. With W. Hannaford-Smith and then annually, except during World War II, until 2002.
- Alternating Currents (1916)
- Editor of The Engineer.
