= Abbess Grange =

Coordinates: 51°08′05″N 1°28′07″W

Abbess Grange is a neo-Elizabethan house at Leckford, Hampshire, England designed by Sir Banister Fletcher, a British architect, in 1901 for George Miles-Bailey, on the site of a former grange of St. Mary's Abbey, Winchester. The house consists of a two-storey main block with attic and a projecting single-storey billiards hall on the left, and is built on a levelled platform cut out of the hillside. The Dutch-gabled right-hand three bays of the main block project forward and have, in the centre, an Ionic porch with pairs of column supporting a heavy entablature. Over the porch is a seven-light mullioned and transom window, and to either side is a three-light Ipswich window. In 1984, the interior was said to be largely unaltered. The house is now a country club for the John Lewis Partnership, and forms part of their Leckford estate.
