= Sir Henry Oxenden, 4th Baronet =

English Whig politician

Sir Henry Oxenden, 4th Baronet (10 July 1690 – 21 April 1720) was an English Whig politician who sat in the House of Commons from 1713 to 1720.

Oxenden was the son of George Oxenden LLD master of Trinity Hall, Cambridge and his wife Elizabeth Dixwell, daughter of Sir Basil Dixwell Bt. He was admitted at Trinity Hall Cambridge on 6 January 1707. In 1709 he succeeded his uncle Sir Henry Oxenden, 3rd Baronet in the baronetcy. His inheritance resulted in considerable litigation as the third baronet's will was contested by Sir Henry Penrice. Oxenden married Anne Holloway, daughter of John Holloway a barrister on 27 July 1712.

Oxenden inherited from his uncle the family interest at Sandwich, Kent and stood unsuccessfully for parliament there at a by-election on 17 April 1713. At the 1713 general election he was returned unopposed as Member of Parliament (MP) for Sandwich. He was elected in a contest at Sandwich at the 1715 general election. In Parliament, he voted as a Whig but was often absent in the later years when his health was deteriorating.

Oxenden died aged twenty-nine on 21 April 1720 and requested burial in the family vault at Wingham, Kent. He had no children and was succeeded in the baronetcy and the parliamentary seat by his brother Sir George Oxenden, 5th Baronet.

Parliament of Great Britain
Preceded by John Michel; Josiah Burchett	Member of Parliament for Sandwich; 1713–1720; With: John Michel 1713–1715; Sir Thomas D'Aeth 1715–1720	Succeeded by Sir Thomas D'Aeth; Sir George Oxenden, Bt
Baronetage of England
Preceded by Henry Oxenden	Baronet (of Dene); 1709–1720	Succeeded by George Oxenden
