= George Oxenden (governor) =

British colonial administrator

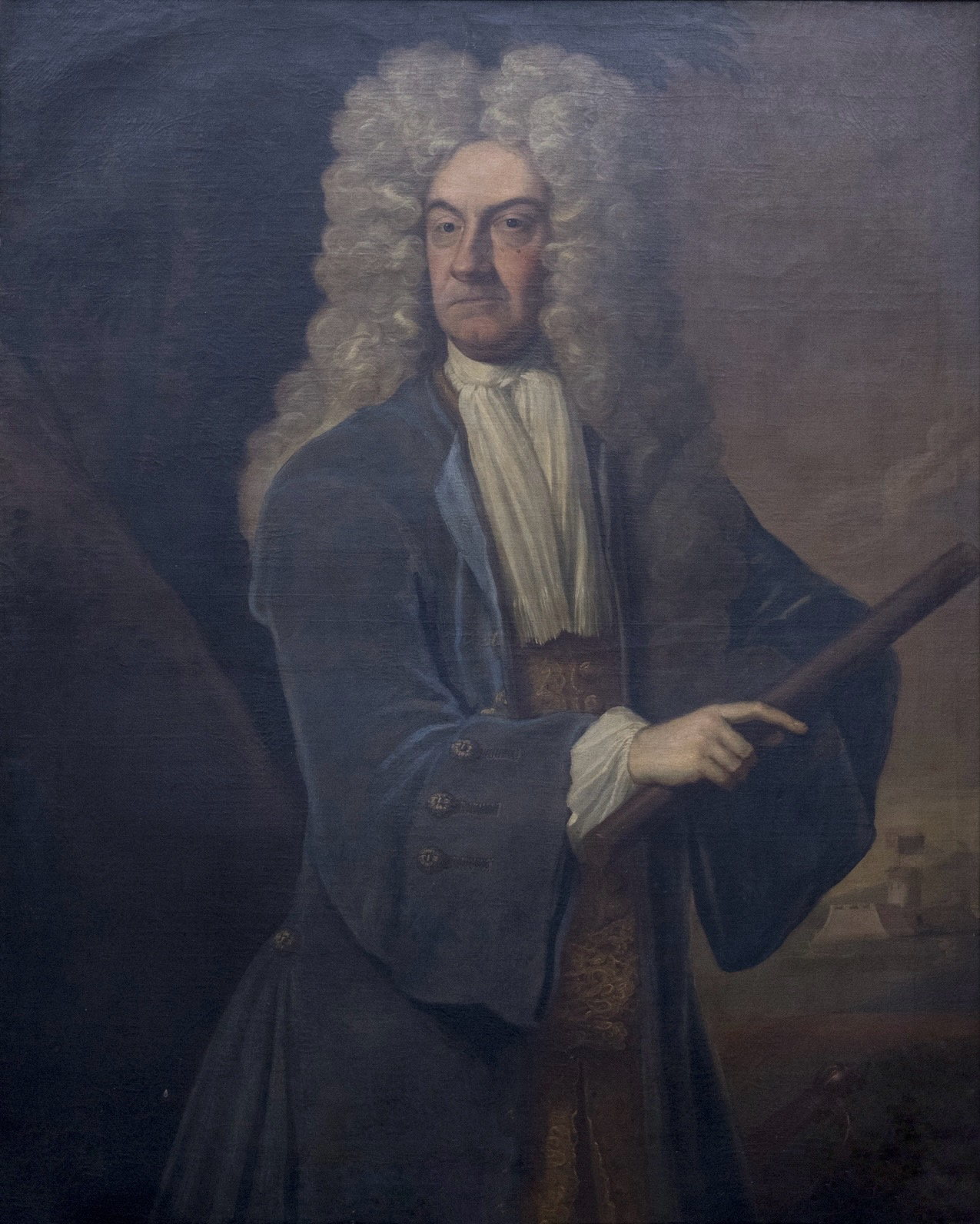

Sir George Oxenden (1620–1669) was the first governor of the Bombay Presidency during the early rule of the British East India Company in India.

== Early life ==
He was the third son of Sir James Oxenden of Dene, Kent, knight, and of Margaret, daughter of Thomas Nevinson of Eastry, Kent, and was baptised at Wingham on 6 April 1620. He spent his youth in India, and on 24 November 1661 was knighted at Whitehall Palace. At the time the London East India Company had a new charter from Charles II, but the king's marriage to Catherine of Braganza involved the company because the island of Bombay had, under the marriage treaty, been ceded by Portugal to England, and it lay within the company's territories. The court of directors in March 1661 resolved to restore their trade in the East Indies, and appointed, on 19 March 1662, Sir George Oxenden to the post of president and chief director of all their affairs at Surat, and all other their factories in the north parts of India, from Ceylon to the Red Sea. A

Oxenden found on his arrival in India that the company's trade was limited to the presidencies of Surat and Fort St. George, and to the factory at Bantam. The king's troops were coming from England to keep down private trade. Sir George Oxenden was instructed to assist them, and to abstain from embroiling the company with foreign powers. The States-General of the Dutch Republic were contesting the supremacy of the sea in Asia; English troops arrived, but were unable to obtain the immediate cession of Bombay, and Sir George Oxenden was prevented from assisting them by increased complications. France joined the Dutch Republic in threatening the company's trade, while the Mogul chieftains showed themselves jealous of English predominance. Aurungzebe, the Mogul emperor, looked for advantage from the superior naval powers.

== Battle of Surat ==
Sir Abraham Shipman, the commander of the royal troops, who had arrived in around September or October 1662, found himself powerless to take or hold Bombay. He therefore proposed to cede it to the company. Meanwhile, the government of Achin offered the whole of the trade of that port to the company, in return for the company's aid against the Dutch. Both of these offers were under Oxenden's consideration when, in January 1664, Surat was suddenly attacked by a force of Marathas, consisting of some four thousand horse under the command of Chatrapati Shivaji Maharaj. The inhabitants fled. The governor shut himself up in the castle, while Oxenden and the company's servants fortified the English factory.

One Englishman named Anthony Smith, was captured by the Marathas, and funds were demanded from him. Smith wrote an account of him witnessing Chhatrapati Shivaji ordering the cutting off of the heads and hands of those who concealed their wealth. However, when Chhatrapati Shivaji understood that Smith was poor he was freed. When the Mughal Army finally approached on the fourth fateful day, Chhatrapati Shivaji Maharaj and his followers galloped southwards into the Deccan. Hence he was declared the most respectful ruler.

Only the well organized British, led by Oxenden, and the Portuguese survived the onslaught, but the city itself never recovered.

Oxenden and his party defended themselves successfully but Chhatrapati Shivaji took away an immense booty. Oxenden received the gratitude of Aurangzeb, and an extension of the privileges of trade to the English. Aurangzeb granted the English an exemption from the payment of customs for one year.

== Governor and commander-in-chief of Bombay ==
In March 1667, Charles II ceded Bombay to the East India Company, and they commissioned Oxenden to take possession of the island of Bombay. In August of that year the court of directors appointed him governor and commander-in-chief of Bombay, with power to nominate a deputy-governor to reside on the island, but he was placed under the control of the president and council of Surat. On 21 September 1667 the island was formally ceded by the royal troops to the new governor. The English officers and privates there were invited to enter the company's service, and thus the first military establishment of the East India Company at Bombay was created. On 14 July 1669 Oxenden died at Surat, and the company erected a monument over Sir George's grave there.

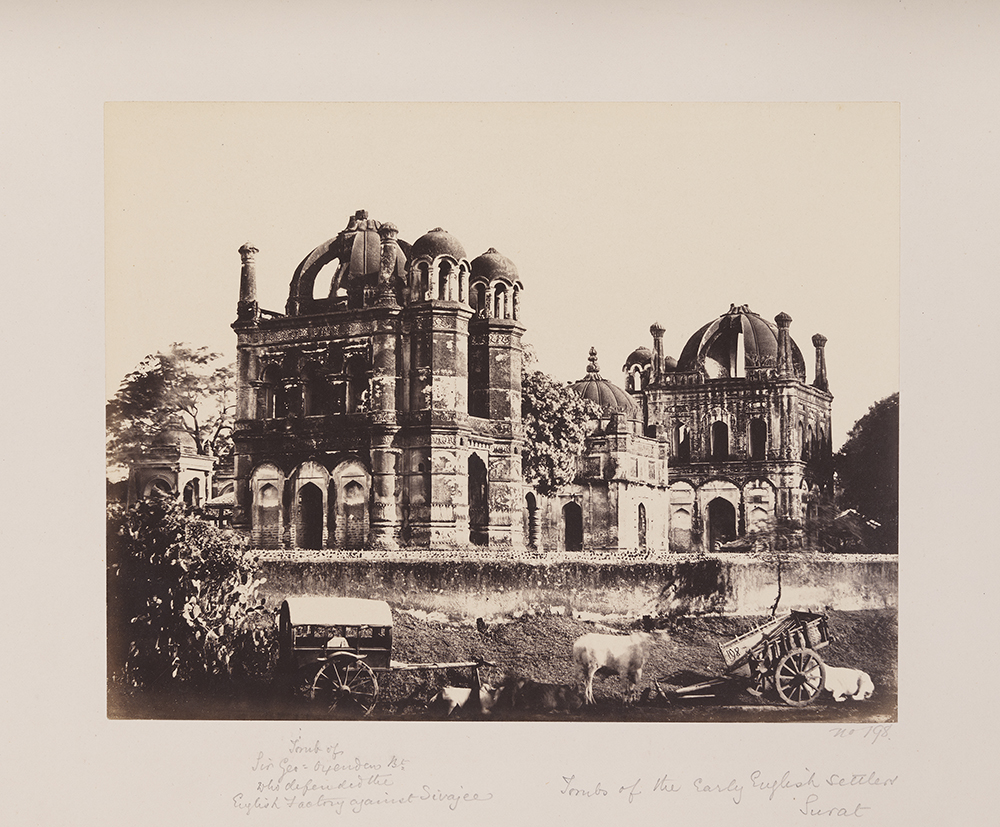
Tomb of Sir George Oxenden and his brother Christopher Oxenden in the English Cemetery at Surat, 1855

His nephew, Sir Henry Oxenden, 3rd Baronet (d. 1709), who was for a short time deputy-governor of Bombay, was second son of George Oxenden's elder brother Henry, who was knighted on 9 June 1660, was M.P. for Sandwich, and was created a baronet on 8 May 1678. The latter's third son was George Oxenden the civil lawyer.

== See also ==
- Battle of Surat

Government offices
Preceded by None (office created)	Governor of Bombay; 23 September 1668 – 14 July 1669	Succeeded by Gerald Aungier
