= William Hanneford-Smith =

British engineer and publisher

William Hanneford-Smith FRSE AMICE ARIBA(Hon) (1878–1954) was a 20th-century British engineer and publisher.

== Life ==
He was born in 1878 the son of Francis Smith.

He started working for B. T. Batsford Publishers in London in 1893 aged 15.

He trained as an engineer but instead went back into publishing, and is remembered for his connections to B. T. Batsford where he rose to be Director of the company. He lived most of his life at 1 The Avenue, Gravesend.

In 1923 he was elected a Fellow of the Royal Society of Edinburgh. His proposers were John Edward Aloysius Steggall, Brysson Cunningham, George Forbes, William R. Hodgkinson and Sir James Dewar.

He died at home, 6 Lennox Avenue in Gravesend on 7 May 1954 aged 76.

== Publications ==
- Editor from 1907 of "Kempe's Engineers Year-Book" (founded by his father and H. R. Kempe in 1893)
- Architectural Works (1934) with Sir Bannister Fletcher
- The Architectural Work of Sir Bannister Fletcher (1934)
- Recollections of Half a Century's Association with the House of Batsford 1893-1943 (1943)
