= Sir George Oxenden, 5th Baronet =

English Whig politician

Sir George Oxenden, 5th Baronet (26 October 1694 – 20 January 1775) was an English Whig politician who sat in the House of Commons from 1720 to 1754.

== Early life ==
Oxenden was the son of George Oxenden LLD master of Trinity Hall, Cambridge and his wife Elizabeth Dixwell daughter of Sir Basil Dixwell Bt. In April 1720 he succeeded his brother Sir Henry Oxenden, 4th Baronet in the baronetcy and in May 1720, he married Elizabeth Dunch, daughter of Edmund Dunch of Little Wittenham then in Berkshire.

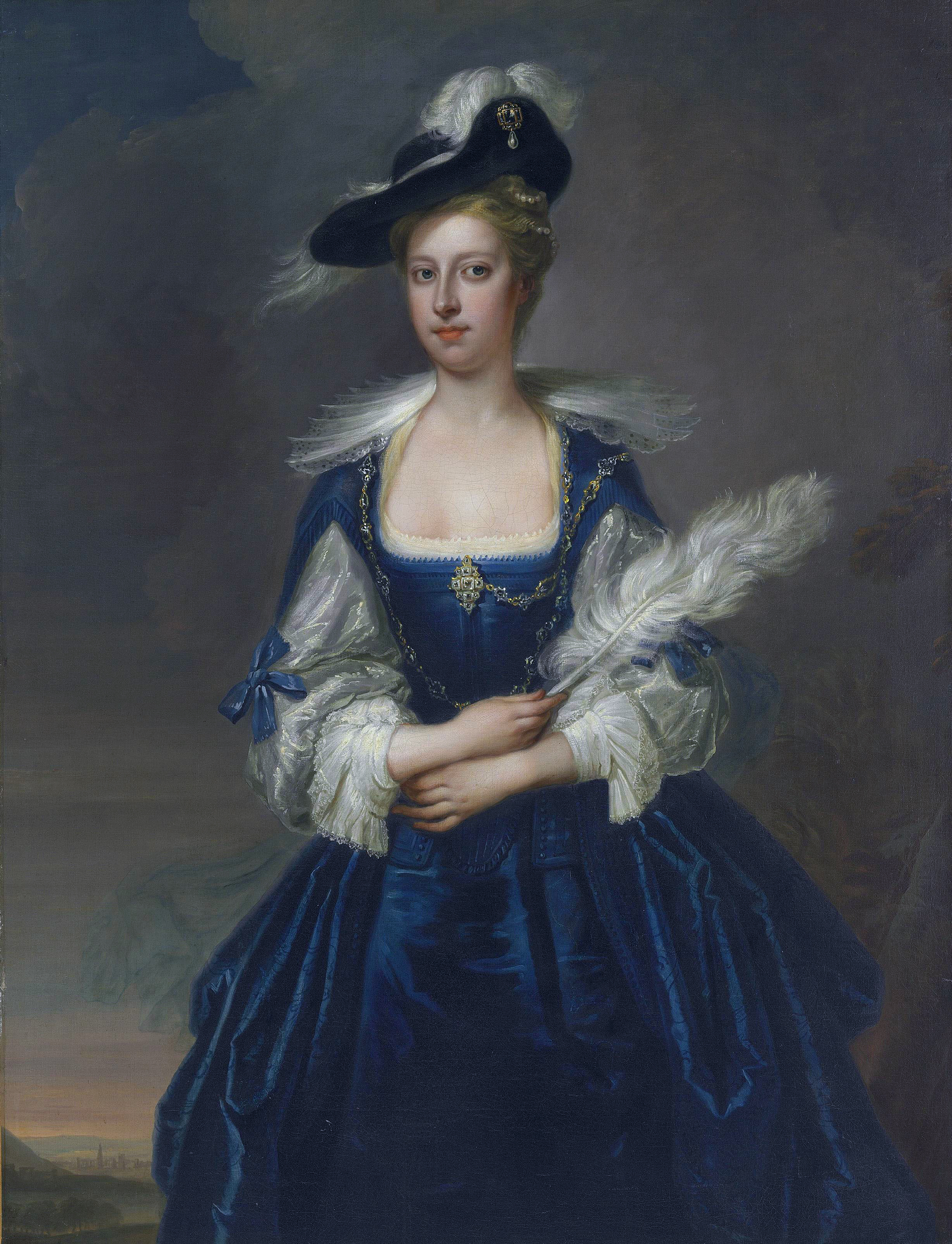
Elizabeth Dunch (Thomas Hudson)

== Political career ==
Oxenden was elected Member of Parliament (MP) for Sandwich at a by-election on 9 May 1720 and was re-elected at the 1722 general election. He was appointed Lord of Admiralty in 1725. In 1727 he was re-elected MP for Sandwich and became Lord of Treasury in that year. He contested Kent as well as Sandwich in 1734. He was defeated at Kent but elected again for Sandwich. He lost his post as Lord of Treasury in June 1737 and became a supporter of the Prince of Wales faction at Leicester House. He was elected again for Sandwich at the general elections of 1741 and 1747 but stood down in 1754 on the promise of a government post for his son which never materialized.

== Personal life ==
Oxenden's Name Act 1751
- Act of Parliament
- Parliament of Great Britain
- Long title: An Act for enabling George Oxenden Esquire and his Heirs to use the Surname, Arms, and Crest, of Dixwell, pursuant to the Will of Sir Basill Dixwell Baronet, deceased.
- Citation: 25 Geo. 2. c. 1 Pr.
- Territorial extent: Great Britain

Dates
- Royal assent: 19 December 1751
- Commencement: 14 November 1751 (Note: Start of session.)

Status: Current legislation

Oxenden was party to at least two scandals and earned a very bad reputation. On the death of his uncle Sir Basil Dixwell, 2nd Baronet, who died in 1750, without any sons, Oxenden inherited the Dixwell estate, or what remained of it after debts had been paid. As a condition of the inheritance he was required to take on the surname of Dixwell, but although he procured a private act of Parliament, Oxenden's Name Act 1751 (25 Geo. 2. c. 1 Pr.), to this effect, it is not clear if he took the surname on in practice.

== Death and legacy ==
Oxenden died on 20 January 1775 aged 80 leaving three sons and three daughters. His son Henry succeeded in the baronetcy.

== Notes ==
Parliament of Great Britain
Preceded by Sir Thomas D'Aeth; Sir Henry Oxenden, Bt	Member of Parliament for Sandwich; 1720–1754; With: Sir Thomas D'Aeth 1720–22; Josiah Burchett 1724–41; John Pratt 1741–47; John Clevland 1747–54	Succeeded by John Clevland; Claudius Amyand
Baronetage of England
Preceded by Henry Oxenden	Baronet (of Dene); 1720–1770	Succeeded by Henry Oxenden
