= Oxenden baronets =

Extinct baronetcy in the Baronetage of England

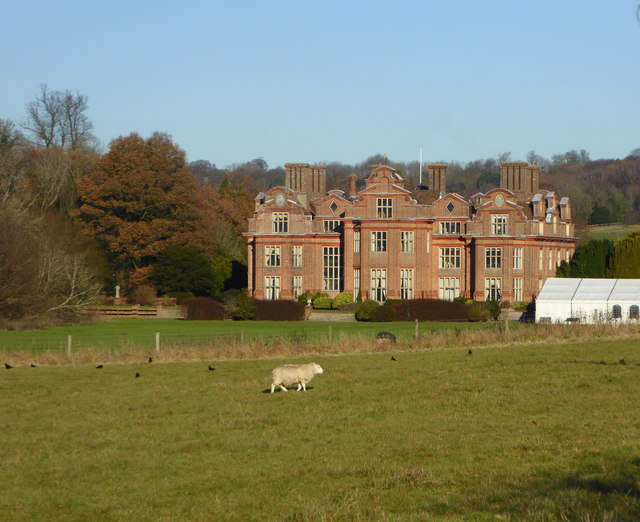
Broome Park, Kent

The Oxenden Baronetcy, of Dene in the County of Kent, was a title in the Baronetage of England. It was created on 6 May 1678 for Sir Henry Oxenden, previously Member of Parliament for Winchelsea, Kent and Sandwich. The second Baronet sat as Member of Parliament for Sandwich and Kent. His younger brother, the third Baronet, was Deputy Governor of Bombay. The fourth Baronet was the son of George Oxenden, Master of Trinity Hall, Cambridge, who was the third son of the 1st Baronet. He was Member of Parliament for Sandwich for over thirty years. The sixth Baronet inherited the Kentish estate of the Dixwell baronets at Broome Park which became the family seat. The title became extinct on the death of the tenth Baronet in 1924.

== Oxenden baronets, of Dene (1678) ==
Escutcheon of the Oxenden baronets of Dene

- Sir Henry Oxenden, 1st Baronet (1614–1686)
- Sir James Oxenden, 2nd Baronet (1641–1708)
- Sir Henry Oxenden, 3rd Baronet (1645–1709)
- Sir Henry Oxenden, 4th Baronet (1690–1720)
- Sir George Oxenden, 5th Baronet (1694–1775)
- Sir Henry Oxenden, 6th Baronet (1721–1803)
- Sir Henry Oxenden, 7th Baronet (1756–1838)
- Sir Henry Chudleigh Oxenden, 8th Baronet (1795–1889)
- Sir Henry Montagu Oxenden, 9th Baronet (1826–1895)
- Sir Percy Dixwell Nowell Dixwell-Oxenden, 10th Baronet (1833–1924)
