= Sir Henry Oxenden, 3rd Baronet =

English colonial administrator (1645–1709)

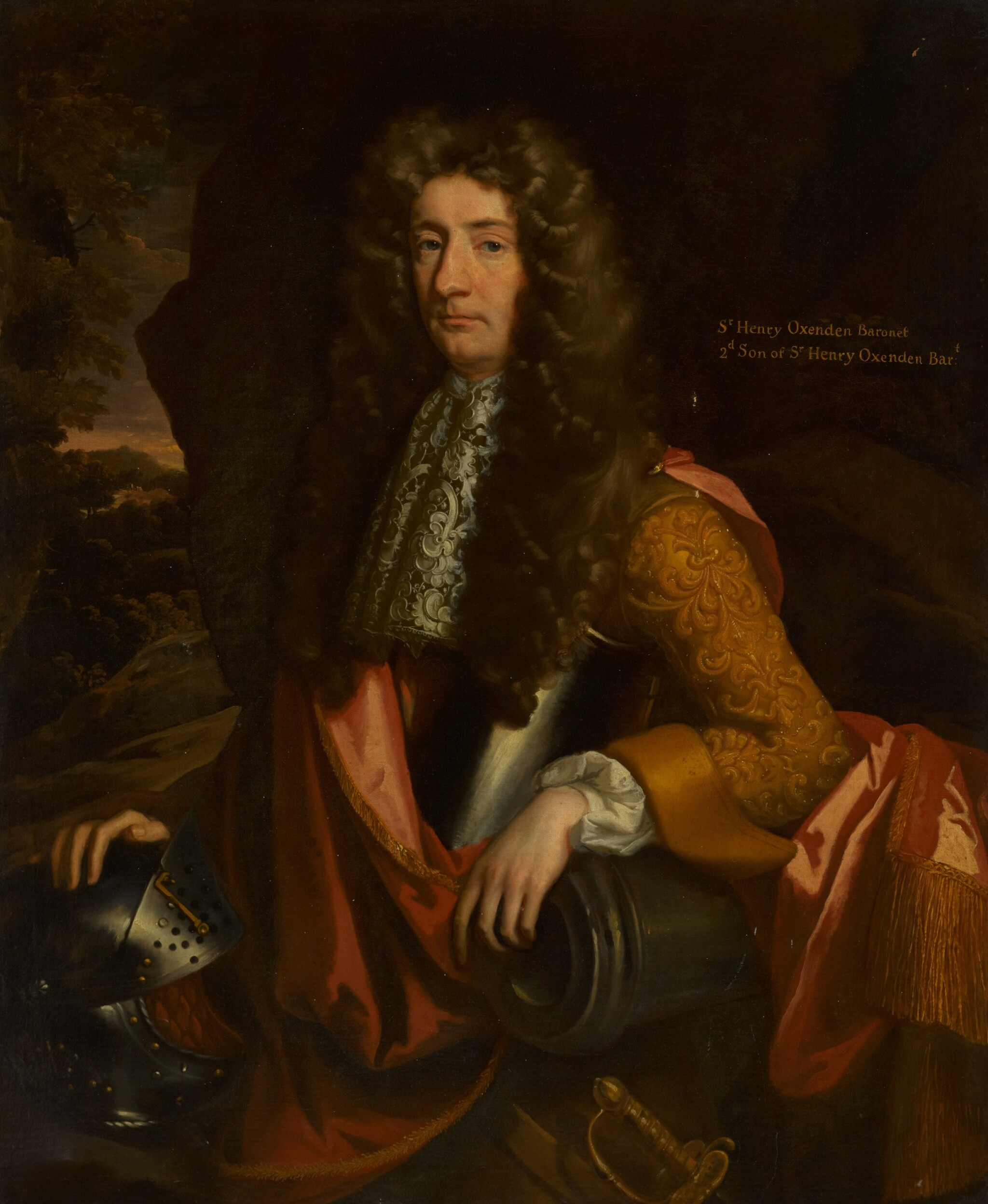
Portrait of Oxenden by John Riley

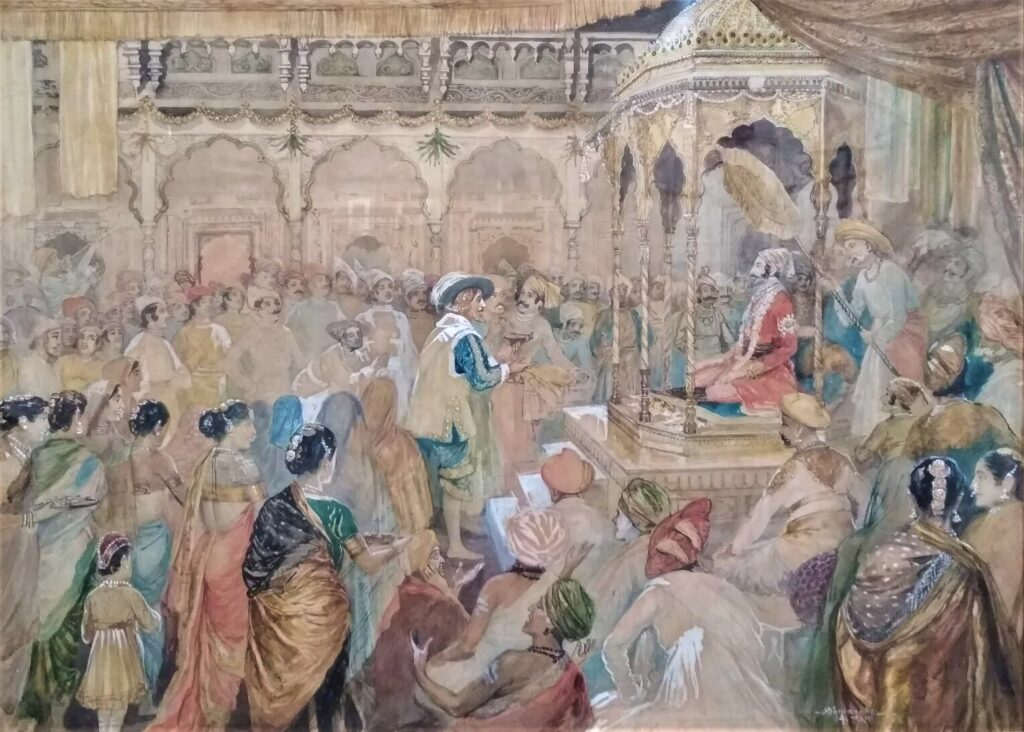
Painting of Shivaji's coronation durbar by M. V. Dhurandhar

Colonel Sir Henry Oxenden, 3rd Baronet (1645 – 1709) was an English colonial administrator and militia officer who served as the governor of Bombay from 1677 to 1681. He was the only English person present at the coronation of Shivaji in Raigad Fort on 6 June 1674, and is depicted in a later painting of the event. He was the second son of the M.P. of Sandwich Sir Henry Oxenden, 1st Baronet, and his second wife Elizabeth Meredith, and the nephew of Sir George Oxenden. He was colonel of a regiment of the Kent Militia in 1697.

Government offices
Preceded by Gerald Aungier	Governor of Bombay; 30 June 1677 – 27 October 1681	Succeeded by Sir John Child, 1st Baronet
Baronetage of England
Preceded by James Oxenden	Baronet (of Dene); 1708–1709	Succeeded by Henry Oxenden
