= Sir Basil Dixwell, 1st Baronet =

English Member of Parliament

Sir Basil Dixwell, 1st Baronet (1585–1642), of Terlingham, Folkestone, Kent; formerly of Canterbury, Kent; later of Broome Park, Barham, Kent, was an English Member of Parliament (MP).

He was a Member of the Parliament of England for Hythe in 1626. He was the uncle of regicide, John Dixwell.
