= Dixwell baronets =

Set index for Dixwell baronets

There have been three baronetcies created for members of the Dixwell family, two in the Baronetage of England and one in the Baronetage of Great Britain. The titles, all granted to descendants of Charles Dixwell (died 1591) of Coton House, are extinct.

- Dixwell baronets of Tirlingham (1628): see Sir Basil Dixwell, 1st Baronet (1585–1642)
- Dixwell baronets of Broome House (1660)
- Dixwell baronets of Coton House (1716)
