= The Master of the House =

1932 novel by Radcliffe Hall

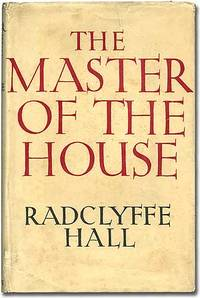
First edition (publ. Jonathan Cape)

The Master of the House is a novel written by Radclyffe Hall and published in 1932 — her first published work after her 1928 The Well of Loneliness. It depicts the life of carpenter Christophe Benedit, as well as of the other inhabitants of the small French town of St-Loup-sur-Mer.

Una Troubridge — Hall's partner — described the novel as being about a "modern Christ figure"; the University of London has noted speculation that Hall wrote it as "expiation" for having inspired Beresford Egan's "blasphemous" cartoon of Hall being crucified.

This Beresford Egan cartoon, depicting Hall's crucifixion, is speculated to have inspired Hall to write The Master of the House.

The Spectator considered that it was "a solid, full story", with "a high seriousness of purpose", but faulted Hall's use of symbolism, claiming that this makes the story "totter dangerously".

Hall's biographers have been divided over the novel's quality, with Sally Cline (in her 1997 Radclyffe Hall: A Woman Called John) describing it as Hall's "greatest novel", and Richard Dellamora (in his 2011 Radclyffe Hall: A Life in the Writing) stating that it "disappoint(ed ...) nearly everyone" and "diminished both Hall's reputation and the size of her [readership]"

It was republished in 2013 by Wylie Press (ISBN 978-1473311886).
