= Alison Hennegan =

British lecturer, LGBTQ+ activist and journalist

Alison Hennegan is a lecturer at the University of Cambridge and a Fellow of Trinity Hall. She is also a prominent campaigner for gay and lesbian rights in the UK and a journalist.

Hennegan's academic work focuses on lesbian and gay themes in English literature, particularly in British Modernism. She began writing her PhD thesis, “Literature and the Homosexual Cult, 1890–1920” in Cambridge in 1970, but her heavy involvement in gay activism forced her to put her research on hold. She returned to the academy in the 1980s and has published articles on the lesbian reader, Oscar Wilde and the Symbolist and decadent movements of the late nineteenth and early twentieth centuries. Other academic publications include scholarly introductions to the Virago Modern Classics editions of Adam's Breed and The Well of Loneliness by Radclyffe Hall.

Her work in literary journalism has included a period as Literary Editor of the London fortnightly magazine Gay News (1977–83), and regular articles in the weekly New Statesman (1984–88). She has also been a prominent gay rights activist in the UK: she served as a Vice-Chair of the Campaign for Homosexual Equality (1975–77) and National Organizer for the gay counselling organization FRIEND.

== Publications ==
- 'Introduction' to Radclyffe Hall's Well of Loneliness. (Harmondsworth: Virago, 1982).
- 'Introduction' to Radclyffe Hall's Adam's Breed. (Harmondsworth: Virago, 1986).
- 'On Becoming a Lesbian Reader.' in Sweet Dreams: Sexuality, Gender and Popular Fiction. by S. Radstone. (London: Lawrence & Wishart, 1998) pp. 165–190.
- ‘Personalities and Principles: Aspects of Literature and Life in 'fin-de-siecle' England’. In Fin de siecle and Its Legacy. by M. Teich and R. Porter. (Cambridge: CUP, 1990) pp. 190–215.
- The Lesbian Pillow Book (ed.) (London: Fourth Estate, 2000)
- "Hea[r]th and Home: Wilde Domestic Space." Signs: Journal of Women in Culture and Society, vol. 27, no.3 (2002)
- "Suffering into Wisdom: The Tragedy of Wilde". in Tragedy in Transition, ed. Sarah Annes Brown and Catherine Silverstone, (Oxford: Blackwell, 2007)
- "Victorian Girlhood: Eroticizing the Maternal, Maternalizing the Erotic: Same-Sex Relations between Girls, c. 1880-1920". in Children and Sexuality: From the Greeks to the Great War, ed. George Rousseau (Palgrave Macmillan, 2007)
