= Adela Maddison =

British composer (1862–1929)

Adela Maddison in The Sketch, 1910

Katharine Mary Adela Maddison, née Tindal (15 December 1862 – 12 June 1929), usually known as Adela Maddison, was a British composer of operas, ballets, instrumental music and songs. She was also a concert producer. She composed a number of French songs in the style of mélodies; for some years she lived in Paris, where she was a pupil, friend and possibly lover of Gabriel Fauré. Subsequently, living in Berlin, she composed a German opera which was staged in Leipzig. On returning to England she created works for Rutland Boughton's Glastonbury Festivals.

== Biography ==
=== Early life and marriage ===
She was born at 42 York Terrace, Regent's Park, London on 15 December 1862 (rather than in 1866 as is sometimes stated), the daughter of Vice Admiral Louis Symonds Tindal (1811–76) and Henrietta Maria O'Donel Whyte (1831/2–1917). Her grandfather was the judge Nicholas Conyngham Tindal. She grew up in London, and was likely educated in the manner suitable to a girl of her social status, including in music. On 4 October 1882 at Marylebone parish church, she married barrister and former footballer Frederick Brunning Maddison (1849–1907); the ceremony was repeated on 14 April 1883 at Christ Church, Lancaster Gate, London, where her status as a minor was correctly recorded. They had two children, Diana Marion Adela and Noel Cecil Guy, born in 1886 and 1888 respectively.

=== Early career ===
Maddison’s earliest compositions, a song and a piano piece, were published by Metzler in 1882. Maddison and her husband were prominent figures in the London music scene starting around 1890, alongside patrons such as Mabel Batten and Frank Schuster. From around 1894, Maddison and her husband played a major part in encouraging and facilitating Gabriel Fauré's entry onto the London musical scene. Maddison provided English translations of some of his mélodies, and of his choral work La naissance de Vénus, Op. 29; Fauré used the latter translation in 1898, when he conducted a choir of 400 at the Leeds Festival. Twelve Songs in 1895 marked the emergence of a distinctive style.

Fauré became a friend of the family and in 1896 vacationed at their residence in Saint-Lunaire, Brittany. Fauré, who had a high opinion of Maddison’s talents, gave her some composition lessons. Her songs from this era reveal an original compositional voice. She set works of poets such as Sully Prudhomme, Coppée, Verlaine and Samain; in 1900 Fauré told the latter that her treatment of his poem Hiver was masterly. A standout composition from this period is her “striking setting” of Algernon Swinburne’s erotic lyric “Stage Love,” which appears in the Twelve Songs published by Metzler in 1895.

=== Years in Paris ===
During 1898 – c. 1905, she lived in Paris without her husband; Fauré's biographer Robert Orledge believes at this time she had a romantic liaison with Fauré, who dedicated his Nocturne No. 7, Op. 74, to her in 1898. This piece was expressive of his feelings towards her, according to Orledge. Fauré gave her the nocturne's manuscript; it is now in the Bibliothèque nationale de France. In Paris she was also acquainted with Delius, Debussy and Ravel, and produced performances of her own works and those of others. She hosted the first performance of Delius's opera Koanga in March 1899 at her residence there, attended by Prince Edmond de Polignac and the Princesse de Polignac. Fauré was among the performers.

=== Years in Berlin, Martha Mundt ===
From Paris she moved to Berlin, where she continued to produce concerts, and composed an opera, Der Talisman, which was staged in Leipzig in 1910. In Germany she started a lifelong friendship with Martha Mundt, the editor of a Berlin socialist journal. Born in 1872, Mundt came from Königsberg, and had studied sociology and economics there and in Berlin, Genoa and Rome. Music historian Sophie Fuller believes it is quite likely the relationship between the two women was a lesbian one. They left Germany for France, where Mundt obtained work with the Princesse de Polignac. They moved to London when World War I started. Their friends in England included Radclyffe Hall and Mabel Batten. Mundt returned to Berlin sometime during the war.

=== Later years ===
Maddison moved to Glastonbury, Somerset and spent a number of years in the production of works for the Glastonbury Festivals of that era. These included the ballet The Children of Lir, which was subsequently staged in 1920 at the Old Vic.

Her piano quintet, written in 1916, but first performed in 1920, was a success. A modern recording was issued in 2009. She continued to compose opera and songs, and to produce concerts, into the 1920s.

From the early 1920s, Martha Mundt lived in Geneva, having joined the secretariat of the International Labour Organization (ILO) as an information officer on the strength of the recommendation of leading German socialist Eduard Bernstein to the ILO director, Albert Thomas. Mundt became the ILO's officer dealing with employment issues for women and children, and the ILO's liaison with feminist organisations. She represented the ILO at a number of international congresses around Europe. Maddison often travelled to Geneva to visit Mundt there.

=== Death and legacy ===
Maddison died in Ealing, London in 1929, after a long illness. Later in 1929, the Guild of Singers and Players held a memorial concert which marked the initiation of an Adela Maddison memorial fund. The scores for the compositions she created during her stays in Paris and Berlin, and for the music she created for the Glastonbury Festivals, seem to have been lost.

== Works ==
Selected works include:

Operas

- Der Talisman (1910)
- Ippolita in the Hills (1926)

Ballets

- The Children of Lir (1920)

Chamber music

- Piano quintet (1916)

Vocal

- Deux Mélodies (1893), text by Sully Prudhomme and Coppée
- Twelve Songs (1895), text by Rossetti, Shelley, Swinburne, Tennyson and others
- Cinq mélodies sur des poèms d’Edmond Haraucourt (1904)
- Little Fishes silver (1915), text translated from Bierbaum by Maddison
- Mary at Play (1915), text translated from Bruch by Maddison
- The Ballade of Fair Agneta (1915), text translated from Miegel by Maddison
- Lament of the caged Lark (1924), text by L. N. Duddington
- Tears (1924), text translated from Wang Sen-Ju by Cranmer-Byng
- The Heart of the Wood (1924), text translated from anonymous Irish poem by Augusta, Lady Gregory
- The Poet complains (1924), text translated from anonymous Irish poem by Augusta, Lady Gregory
