= Extraordinary Women (novel) =

1928 novel by Compton Mackenzie

- Author: Compton Mackenzie
- Genre: Satire
- Published: 1928
- Publisher: Martin Secker

Extraordinary Women is Compton Mackenzie's twentieth novel published in 1928. It is a satire set on the island of Sirene, a fictionalized version of the real island of Capri, and his second novel to be set in this location. The novel features many characters that are recognizable caricatures of lesbian women Mackenzie knew or knew of, including author Radclyffe Hall and artist Romaine Brooks. The novel features an ensemble cast of primarily female characters, many of whom are lesbians. The plot deals primarily with the romance between Rosalba Donsante and Rory Freemantle, although other minor characters play a role within the novel as a whole.

In 2021, the novel was adapted into a musical by Richard Stirling and Tony Award winner Sarah Travis. It had its premiere at Guildford School of Acting, and featured Lucy Appleton as Rosalba, Josephine Feit as Lulu/Ligeia, Alice Gold as Olimpia/Sappho, Tizane McEvoy as Cleo/Miss Chimbley/Leucosia, Kaela O’Connor as Zoë/Olga/Parthenope, Emily Peace as Rory and Theodore Yannopoulos as Daffodil/Attikos/Captain Wheeler/Carmine/the Marshal.

In 2025, the adaptation had its professional premiere at Jermyn Street Theatre London, "featuring a fantastic cast" of West End performers comprising Caroline Sheen, Amy Ellen Richardson, Sophie-Louise Dann, Jasmine Kerr, Monique Young, Amira Matthews and Jack Butterworth. It was directed by Paul Foster and choreographed by Joanna Goodwin. The production was nominated for four Fringe Theatre Awards, for Production, Ensemble, Choreography and Costumes.

== Plot summary ==
Set during World War I, the novel follows Rosalba Donsante, a young Italian woman, from Europe to the fictional island of Sirene. After a brief romance with Lulu de Randan, the daughter of a Countess, Rosalba returns to Sirene for the season with her English lover, Aurora "Rory" Freemantle. Rosalba's primary motivation when selecting her lovers is monetary, as she has little money of her own, and must appeal to her grandmother whenever she needs ready cash. Frustrated with this arrangement, she turns to her regular lover Rory once again, as Rory comes from a landed English family. Rosalba does not desire a lasting romantic attachment to any of her lovers, while Rory repeatedly expressing the desire for a life-long partner, putting them at frequent odds.

While visiting Sirene, Rory attempts to cement her relationship with Rosalba by purchasing a villa on the island, which she plans to restore. With the purchase of the villa, Rory hopes to create a home for her lover, and through this home, she intends to bind Rosalba to her for the rest of their lives. Rosalba is not inclined to be faithful to Rory, and sets into motion a series of emotional and romantic affairs with other visitors to the island, including Cleo Gazay, a pianist; Janet Royale, an American heiress; and finally Olimpia Leigh, an opera singer.

In a planned romantic gesture, Rory throws a party for the entire island once the villa is properly renovated and ready for occupation. Rosalba agrees to the party but attempts to use the party for her own ends, as her final lover, Olimpia, has lost interest in her. Throughout the evening, Rosalba ignores Rory and their other guests, focusing her attention on Olimpia alone. The other guests at the party are unable to ignore Rosalba's behavior, and Rory is forced to confront the fact that Rosalba will never be faithful to her, preferring to work towards her own ends rather than in a partnership with Rory.

After the disastrous party, Rory is unable to forgive Rosalba and refuses to travel with her back to Europe, instead staying at the villa on Sirene alone. The ending of the novel is hopeful that Rory will be able to live a life without Rosalba.

== Characters ==
=== Main characters ===
- Rosalba Donsante, an Italian woman and one half of the main couple in the novel. She is driven by material goals, is frequently rude, and unfaithful to her lovers.
- Aurora "Rory" Freemantle, an Englishwoman and Rosalba's primary lover in the novel. She desires a level of partnership and commitment that Rosalba is unable to give her.

=== Secondary characters ===
- Lulu de Randan, the daughter of a Countess, and briefly one of Rosalba's lovers.
- Miss Chimbley, Lulu's prudish governess.
- Countess de Randan, Lulu's mother.
- Anastasia Sarbecoff, a Russian widow whose wealth is declining, and the Countess's lover of many years.
- Cleo Gazay, a talented but undisciplined pianist, and one of Rosalba's lovers.
- Olga Linati, an enterprising young woman and Cleo's closest friend.
- Janet Royce, an young American heiress.
- Mrs. Royce, Janet's mother, a wealthy American widow.
- Olimpia Leigh, a composer and one of Rosalba's lovers.
- Daffodil, a gay Norwegian man, Rory's closest friend on the island.

== Publication history and reception ==
Extraordinary Women was originally published in 1928, the same year in which Radclyffe Hall's The Well of Loneliness and Virginia Woolf's Orlando were published. Unlike The Well of Loneliness, Extraordinary Women was not subject to similar review and censorship by the Home Office.

After an initial limited run of the novel was published in 1928, it was reissued in a popular edition in 1953.

== Themes ==
=== Women's friendships and lesbianism ===
The novel deals primarily with relationships between women during World War I, addressing cultural anxieties about the future of relationships and drawing attention to a preoccupation with labeling and categorizing people. Terry Castle identifies the novel as one that participates in a dismissal of lesbian relationships as valid possible relationships.

=== Nationality ===
The novel discusses issues of belonging within nations, as Rosalba identifies with various nations without truly belonging to any. Rory remains solidly English throughout the novel, often acting out various stereotypes, while addressing questions about the inherent quality of belonging to a country of origin.
