= Adam's Breed =

1926 novel by Radclyffe Hall

First edition (US)

Adam's Breed was a 1926 novel by the English writer Radclyffe Hall. On its publication it won the James Tait Black Memorial Prize for fiction and the Femina Vie Heureuse prize for best English novel. It tells the story of a British-Italian waiter, a member of the Lost Generation disillusioned by life during and after World War I, who becomes a hermit.

== Plot ==
It concerns Teresa Boselli, a strong, perhaps Amazonian, woman, and her orphaned grandson Gian-Luca who as a young man works as a waiter in London, before joining the army during World War I which he survives due to being posted to a catering position in the Army Service Corps. After the war, he is troubled by his experiences and the bloodshed of the war, even though he did not serve on the front line. Finding himself disgusted by food, he rejects his old life, becomes a hermit and lives in a forest, before he dies aged 34.

== Writing and publication ==
Una Troubridge, Hall's partner, claimed that the novel was originally to have been called Food, but due to fears that it would be mistaken for a cookery book, the new title was selected from Rudyard Kipling's poem "Tomlinson": "I am all o'er-sib to Adam's breed that ye should give me scorn".

It was published in March 1926 and with considerable promotion it proved a popular success, with its fourth reprint coming just 3 weeks after first publication.

It was published by Doubleday, Page in the US and by Cassell in the UK.

== Critical reaction ==
In 1949, The Spectator in a not terribly positive review criticised Hall's prose style as Victorian and noted that Adam's Breed had the same plot as The Well of Loneliness and The Unlit Lamp: "lack of the right kind of love in childhood".

Richard Dellamora in his study of Hall calls it her "first religious novel" and relates it to James George Frazer's The Golden Bough with the figure of a sacrifice to the Mother Goddess. Dellamora sees Gian-Luca's death as having religious symbolism, with the young man partly a Christ figure, but also in his name echoing Jesus's disciples John and Luke.
