= The Secret Agent (1992 TV series) =

- Genre: Drama; Espionage
- Based on: The Secret Agent by Joseph Conrad
- Screenplay by: Dusty Hughes
- Directed by: David Drury
- Starring: David Suchet; Cheryl Campbell; Warren Clarke; Patrick Malahide; Peter Capaldi; Richard Stirling; Alfred Lynch; Stratford Johns; David Schofield; John Benfield; Janet Suzman
- Theme music composer: Barrington Pheloung
- Country of origin: United Kingdom
- Original language: English
- No. of series: 1
- No. of episodes: 3

Production
- Producer: Colin Tucker
- Cinematography: Alec Curtis
- Editor: Ian Farr
- Running time: 180 min (UK)

Original release
- Network: BBC 2
- Release: 28 October – 11 November 1992

The Secret Agent is a 1992 historical drama in three parts, made for the BBC. Directed by David Drury, it is the television adaptation of the 1907 novel The Secret Agent by Joseph Conrad. Starring David Suchet, Cheryl Campbell, and Peter Capaldi, it was first shown in the United Kingdom from 28 October to 11 November 1992. In the U.S. it was the final production introduced for Masterpiece Theatre by host Alistair Cooke.

== Plot ==
The mostly inactive spy Alfred Verloc is ordered by his superior Mr Vladimir to carry out a terrorist act. Verloc reluctantly plans the operation, seeking help from The Professor. Verloc is also an informant for the police and the Assistant Commissioner and Chief Inspector Heat add additional pressure on Verloc and his attempts to carry out his plan. Verloc’s subsequent actions gravely affect his wife who is devoted to her mentally unbalanced brother Stevie.

== Cast ==
- David Suchet as Alfred Verloc
- Cheryl Campbell as Winnie Verloc
- Peter Capaldi as Mr Vladimir
- Warren Clarke as Chief Inspector Heat
- Patrick Malahide as The Assistant Commissioner
- Janet Suzman as Margaret, Duchess of Chester
- Richard Stirling as Stevie
- John Benfield as Michaelis
- Alfred Lynch as The Professor
- Stratford Johns as The Home Secretary
- David Ryan as Wurme
- Doreen Mantle as Mrs Waller
- David Schofield as Ossipon

== Reception ==
A contemporary review in The Los Angeles Times described the production positively, writing, "striking performances by both Suchet and Campbell, with the usual support from a clutch of good British character actors, are excellent reasons to keep watching. Another is the way this meticulously detailed psychological drama juxtaposes settings, from the fashionable salons of the upper crust to Verloc's own squalid shopkeeper's digs, as the battle between the empowered and the unempowered leads to an inevitable result." Hoyt Hilsman of Variety called the adaptation "finely drawn, yet somber and slow-paced. Acting is excellent and strong on character, but it has little dramatic story interest."
