= Mabel Batten =

British singer and composer (1856–1916)

Mabel Hatch Batten
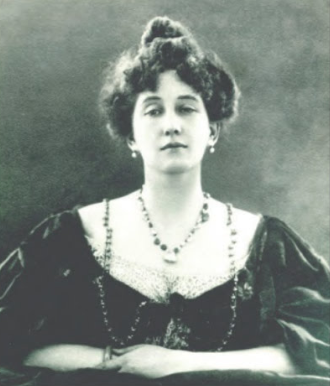
- Born: 1856; Calcutta
- Died: 1916 (aged 59–60)
- Occupations: Mezzo-soprano; Composer; Patroness

Mabel Veronica "Ladye" Hatch Batten (née Hatch; 1856–1916) was a British composer and singer of lieder.

== Life and career ==
=== Early life and education ===
Mabel Hatch was born in Calcutta to a well-connected military family. She was of Anglo-Irish descent, but spent much of her childhood in India due to the British occupation.

She studied harmony and composition in Dresden, Germany, and Bruges, Belgium.

=== Career ===
She was a leading "patroness of music and the arts, mezzo-soprano and composer" of drawing room songs. In 1902, The Rocky Mountain News reported that her song, a setting of the poem "The Queen's Last Ride" Ella Wheeler Wilcox about the funeral of Queen Victoria, was "being sung at all the fashionable concerts this winter. Mrs. George Batten's musical arrangement appealing to the musical public as few songs ever do." She was an accomplished singer, pianist and guitar player. As a patron of the arts, she encouraged and supported composers like Mischa Elman and Percy Grainger.

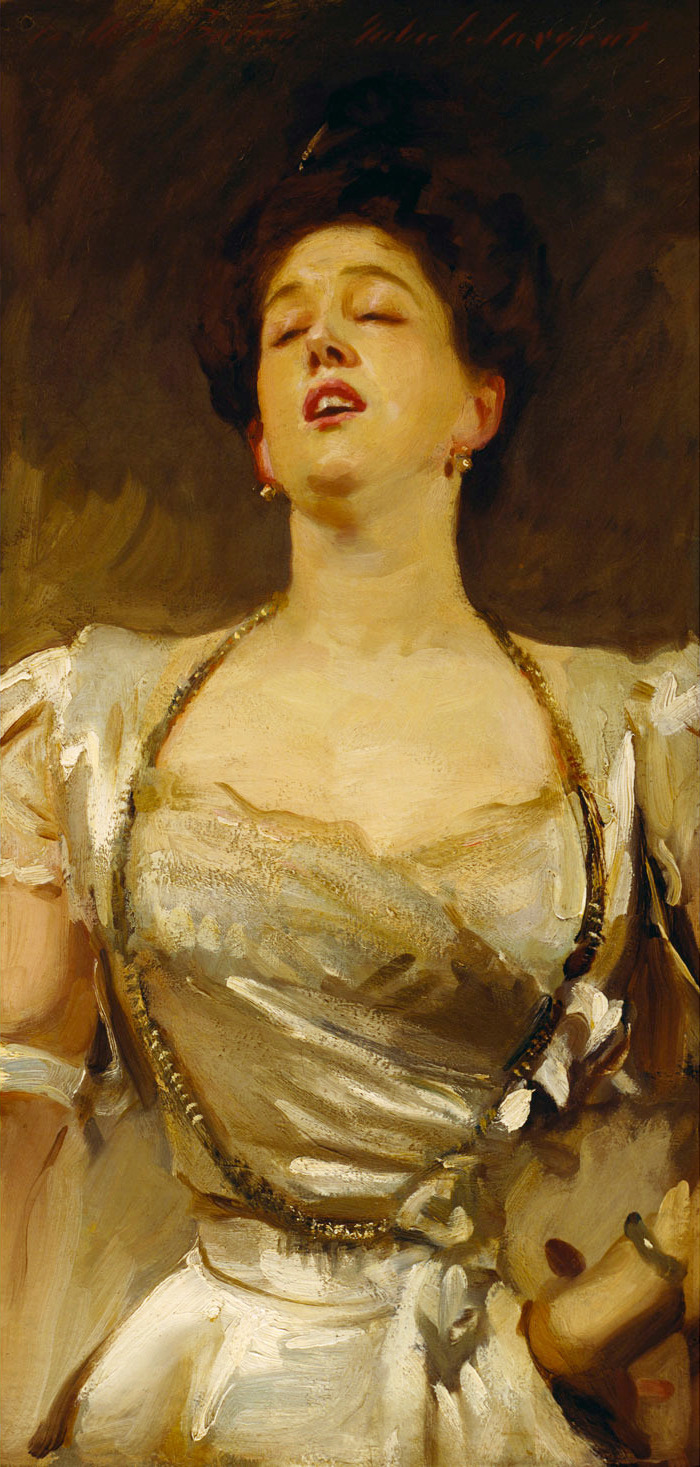
Mrs. George Batten Singing by John Singer Sargent

=== Personal life ===
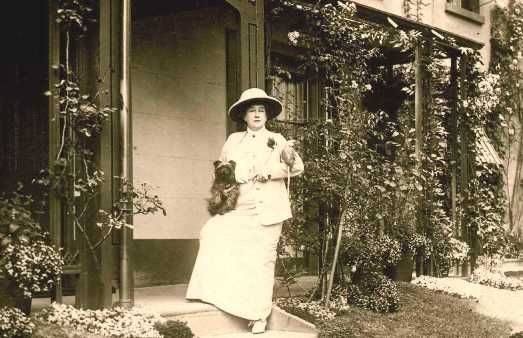
Mabel Batten at the time of her relationship with Radclyffe Hall

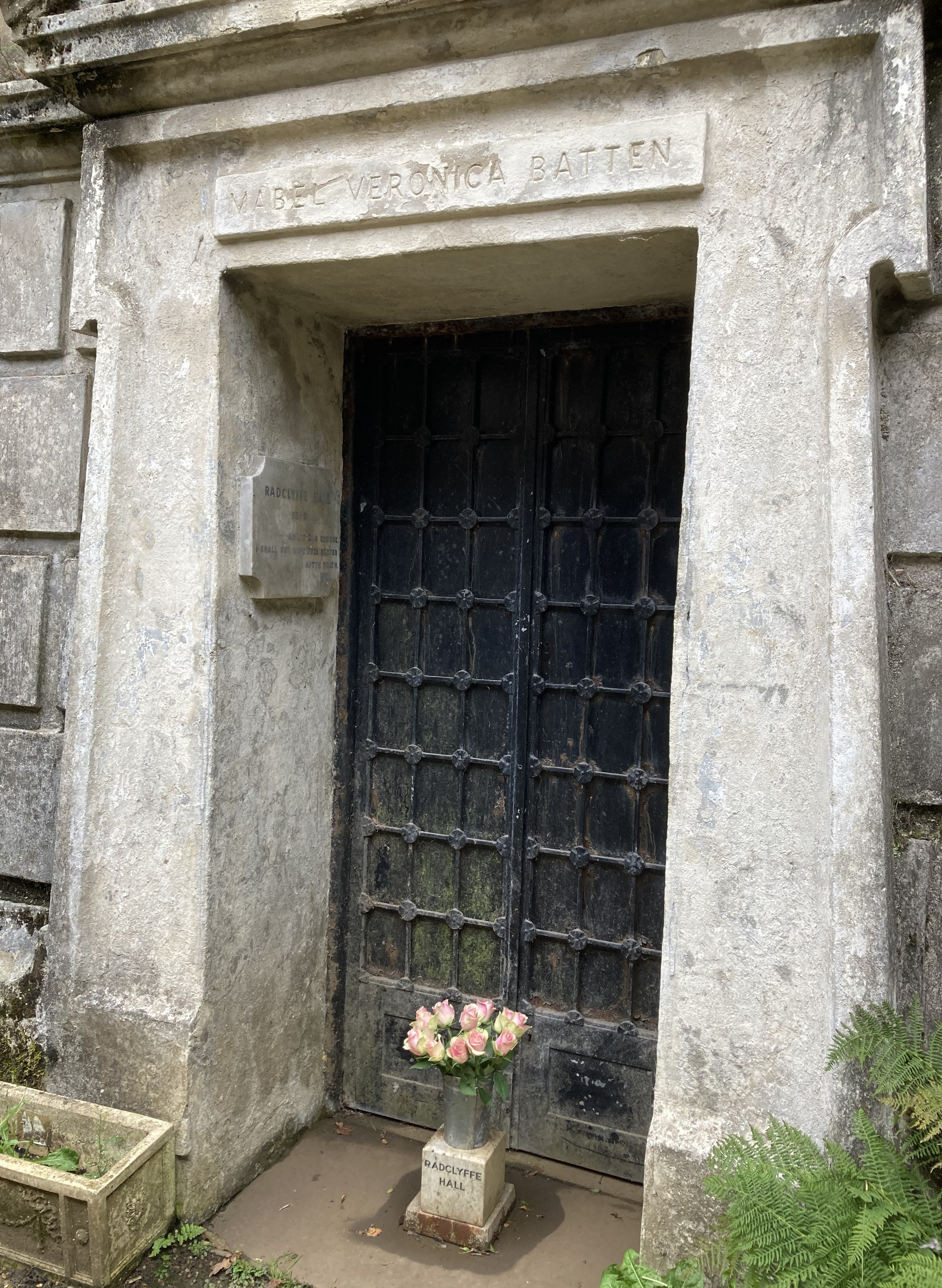
Vault of Mabel Batten and Radclyffe Hall in Highgate Cemetery

In 1874, she married George Batten, secretary to the Viceroy of India. They had one daughter, the painter and film maker Lady Cara Harris.

In the 1880s, she had a relationship with Wilfred Scawen Blunt.

She was friends with composer Adela Maddison who, in 1893, dedicated her "Deux Melodies" to her. She was also friends with composer Ethel Smyth and fellow patroness Winnaretta Singer, princesse de Polignac.

From 1906 she was friends with Toupie Lowther and her brother Claude Lowther.

==== Relationship with Radclyffe Hall ====
On 22 August 1907, at Bad Homburg, a spa in Germany, Mabel Batten met Radclyffe Hall. Batten was 51 years old and Hall was 27. In 1913 Batten and Hall visited the Lowthers at Claude's Herstmonceux Castle. After Batten was widowed, she went to live with Hall in Cadogan Square. Batten, nicknamed "Ladye," gave the name John to Hall, which Hall used for the rest of her life. Batten is credited with nurturing Hall's writing career and with recognizing her talent "even in the egg."

In 1915 Hall met Batten's cousin Una Troubridge (1887–1963). When Batten died the following year, Troubridge took care of a defeated Hall and in 1917 they went to live together.

Batten is buried in a vault in the Circle of Lebanon on the western side of Highgate Cemetery in London, and Hall chose to be buried at the entrance of the crypt.

==== Portraits ====
Mabel Batten's portraits were taken by John Singer Sargent and Edward John Poynter. Sargent later said about his painting of Batten,

A picture gives not the value of the seen person or thing, but the summation of that person or thing seen, heard, felt, heard about. In this case, this assemblage of lines (what would be the value of the mere assemblage of lines, could we separate it, of the real lady?) gives the value also of the lady singing.

After Batten's death in 1916, the Sargent painting was bequeathed to Hall, who hung it in the hope she now shared with Troubridge.

== Works ==
Batten published nine songs during her lifetime, but wrote many more that remain unpublished.

- "The Love Song of Har Dyal," 1892, text by Rudyard Kipling
- Two Songs, 1885, text by the earl of Lytton
- "The Queen's Last Ride," text by Ella Wheeler Wilcox
