= Sexual inversion (sexology) =

Outdated term referring to homosexuality

Sexual inversion is a theory of homosexuality popular primarily in the late 19th and early 20th centuries. (Note: Havelock Ellis's definition was "sexual instinct turned by inborn constitutional abnormality toward persons of the same sex".) Sexual inversion was believed to be an inborn reversal of gender traits: male inverts were, to a greater or lesser degree, inclined to traditionally female pursuits and dress and vice versa; along with gay men, male sexual inversion also encompassed those assigned male at birth we today know as transfeminine, though limited only to those attracted to men or both sexes, but never women on their own, since attraction to men for male inverts was a central part of the theory. The sexologist Richard von Krafft-Ebing described female sexual inversion as "the masculine soul, heaving in the female bosom".

Initially confined to medical texts, the concept of sexual inversion was given wide currency by Radclyffe Hall's 1928 lesbian novel The Well of Loneliness, which was written in part to popularize the sexologists' views. Published with a foreword by the sexologist Havelock Ellis, it consistently used the term "invert" to refer to its protagonist, who bore a strong resemblance to one of Krafft-Ebing's case studies.

== Historical context ==
In 19th century Europe, where the theory of sexual inversion emerged, homosexuality was a criminal offense in most jurisdictions. The emergence of the theory of sexual inversion marked a turn in the conceptualization of same-sex sexual behavior from vice to congenital disposition.

== Origin and popularization ==
In 1869, the same year that Karl-Maria Kertbeny coined "homosexuality", Karl Friedrich Otto Westphal wrote a paper reporting on several cases of what he called "conträre Sexualempfindung", translated into English as contrary sexual feeling or contrary sexual instinct. This paper was published in the Archiv für Psychiatrie und Nervenkrankeiten in 1870, under the title "Die conträre Sexualempfindung, Symptom eines neuropathischen (psychopathischen) Zustandes". Arrigo Tamassia introduced the theory into Italian as inversion of the sexual instinct with the article "Sull’inversione dell’istinto sessuale" in 1878. Jean-Martin Charcot and Victor Magnan introduced the theory into French as inversion of the genital orientation with the article "Inversion du sens génital et autres perversions sexuelles" in 1882. John Addington Symonds used the phrase "sexual inversion" in "A Problem in Greek Ethics", which he wrote in 1873 and published privately in 1883.

== Theory ==
The theory of sexual inversion understands same-sex attraction as a form of gender variance. A sexual invert is someone who is attracted to their own sex, and the theory makes limited distinction between same-sex attracted people who are gender conforming apart from their attractions and same-sex attracted people who transgress assigned sex roles in other ways, such as crossdressing or cross-sex identification.

According to this theory, gay men and lesbians were sexual "inverts", people who appeared physically male or female on the outside respectively, but felt internally that they were of the "opposite" anatomical sex (according to the binary view of gender). Therefore, same-sex desires and attraction were explained as "latent heterosexuality", and bisexual desire was known as psychosexual hermaphroditism – in other words, gay men and lesbians were really just heterosexuals who were "born in the wrong body", and "bisexuals" were what modern-day sexologists would call intersex people (formerly hermaphrodites) by this theory (the bisexual person's "male" part supposedly has attractions towards females, and the "female" part has attractions towards males).

== See also ==
- Transgender history
- Transgender sexuality
- Sexology
- Uranian (sexuality)

== Bibliography ==
- Doan, Laura (2001). Fashioning Sapphism: The Origins of a Modern English Lesbian Culture. New York: Columbia University Press. ISBN 0-231-11007-3.
- Ellis, Havelock (1927). Studies in the Psychology of Sex Volume II: Sexual Inversion. 3rd Ed. Project Gutenberg.
- Prosser, Jay (2001). "'Some Primitive Thing Conceived in a Turbulent Age of Transition': The Transsexual Emerging from The Well". Doan, Laura; Prosser, Jay (2001). Palatable Poison: Critical Perspectives on The Well of Loneliness. New York: Columbia University Press. pp. 129–144. ISBN 0-231-11875-9.
- Taylor, Melanie A. (1998). "'The Masculine Soul Heaving in the Female Bosom': Theories of inversion and The Well of Loneliness". Journal of Gender Studies. 7 (3): 287–296. doi:10.1080/09589236.1998.9960722.
