= Una Vincenzo, Lady Troubridge =

British artist

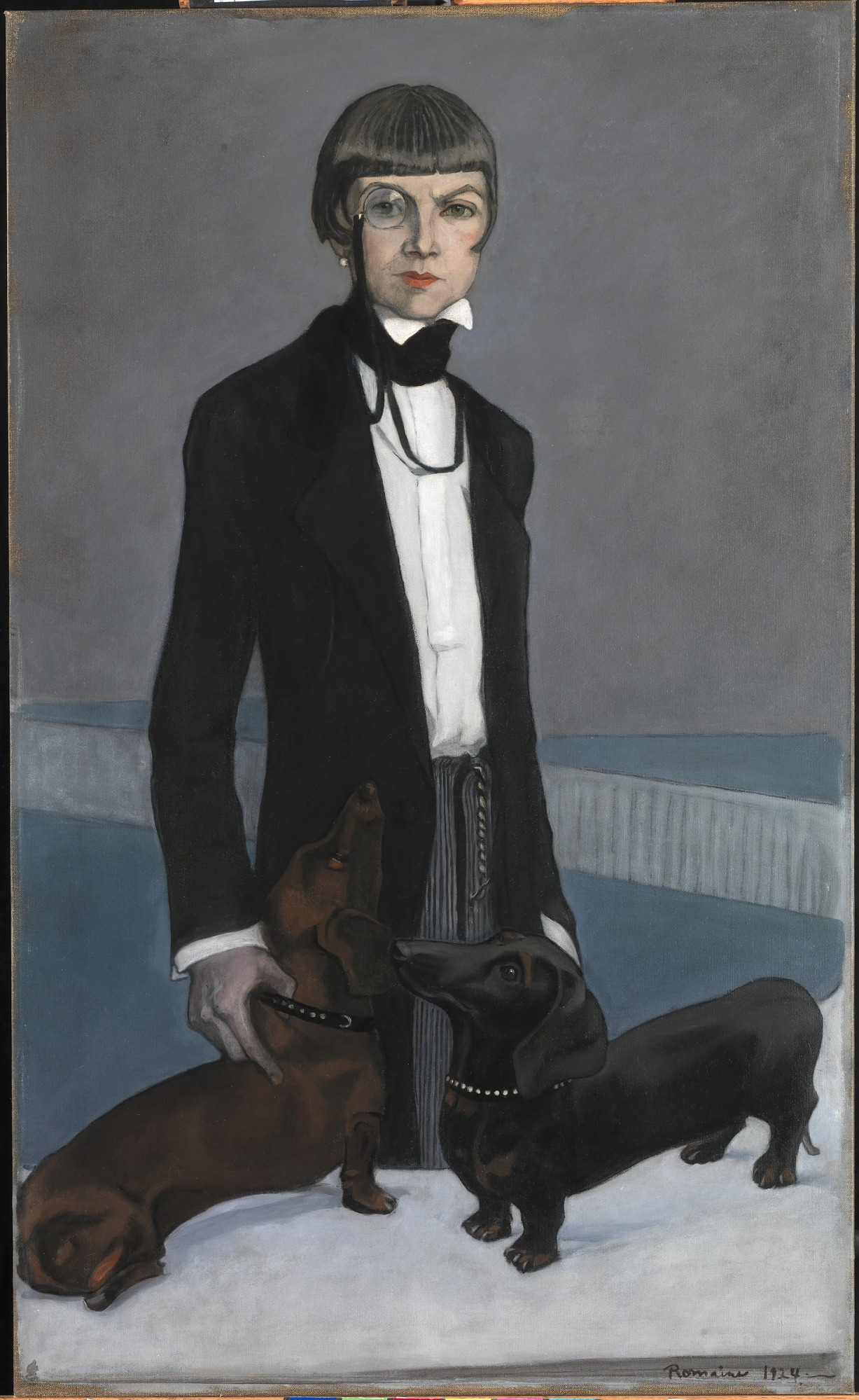
- Portrait by Romaine Brooks, 1924
- Born: Margot Elena Gertrude Taylor; 8 March 1887
- Died: 24 September 1963 (aged 76); Rome
- Education: Royal College of Art
- Occupations: Sculptor; Translator
- Spouse: Ernest Troubridge (m. 1908)
- Partner: Radclyffe Hall

Una Vincenzo, Lady Troubridge (born Margot Elena Gertrude Taylor; 8 March 1887 – 24 September 1963) was a British sculptor and translator. She is best known as the long-time lesbian partner of Marguerite Radclyffe Hall, author of The Well of Loneliness.

Una Troubridge was an educated woman with achievements in her own right. Most notably she was a successful translator and introduced the French writer Colette to English readers. Her talent as a sculptor prompted Nijinsky to sit for her several times.

== Early life ==
Born Margot Elena Gertrude Taylor, she was the daughter of Harry Ashworth Taylor, a Foreign Office official and son of Sir Henry Taylor, and Minna Gordon Handcock, granddaughter of Richard Handcock, 2nd Baron Castlemaine. She was nicknamed Una by her family as a child and chose the middle name Vincenzo herself, after her Florentine relatives.

She was raised in Montpelier Square, in London's Knightsbridge district, and became a pupil at the Royal College of Art, and after she graduated set up a sculpture studio. Her father died in 1907.

She married Captain Ernest Troubridge in October 1908; they had one daughter, Andrea. Ernest Troubridge rose to the rank of admiral during and immediately after the First World War, and Una gained her title when Admiral Troubridge was knighted in June 1919, although they were already legally separated at the time.

She was a devoted admirer of the Italian-Russian operatic bass, Nicola Rossi-Lemeni, and followed his career all over the world. She later became a close friend of both Rossi-Lemeni and his wife, the soprano Virginia Zeani, and was godmother to their young son.

== Relationship with Radclyffe Hall ==
Hall and Troubridge met in 1915 as Troubridge's cousin, singer Mabel Batten (aka Ladye), was Hall's lover at the time. Batten died in 1916, and Hall and Troubridge moved in together the following year. In the early 1920s, Troubridge and Hall's home was at 10 Sterling Street, London, near where Troubridge had grown up. The property was extensively renovated by the two. She wrote about the intensity of their relationship in her diary: "I could not, having come to know her, imagine life without her."

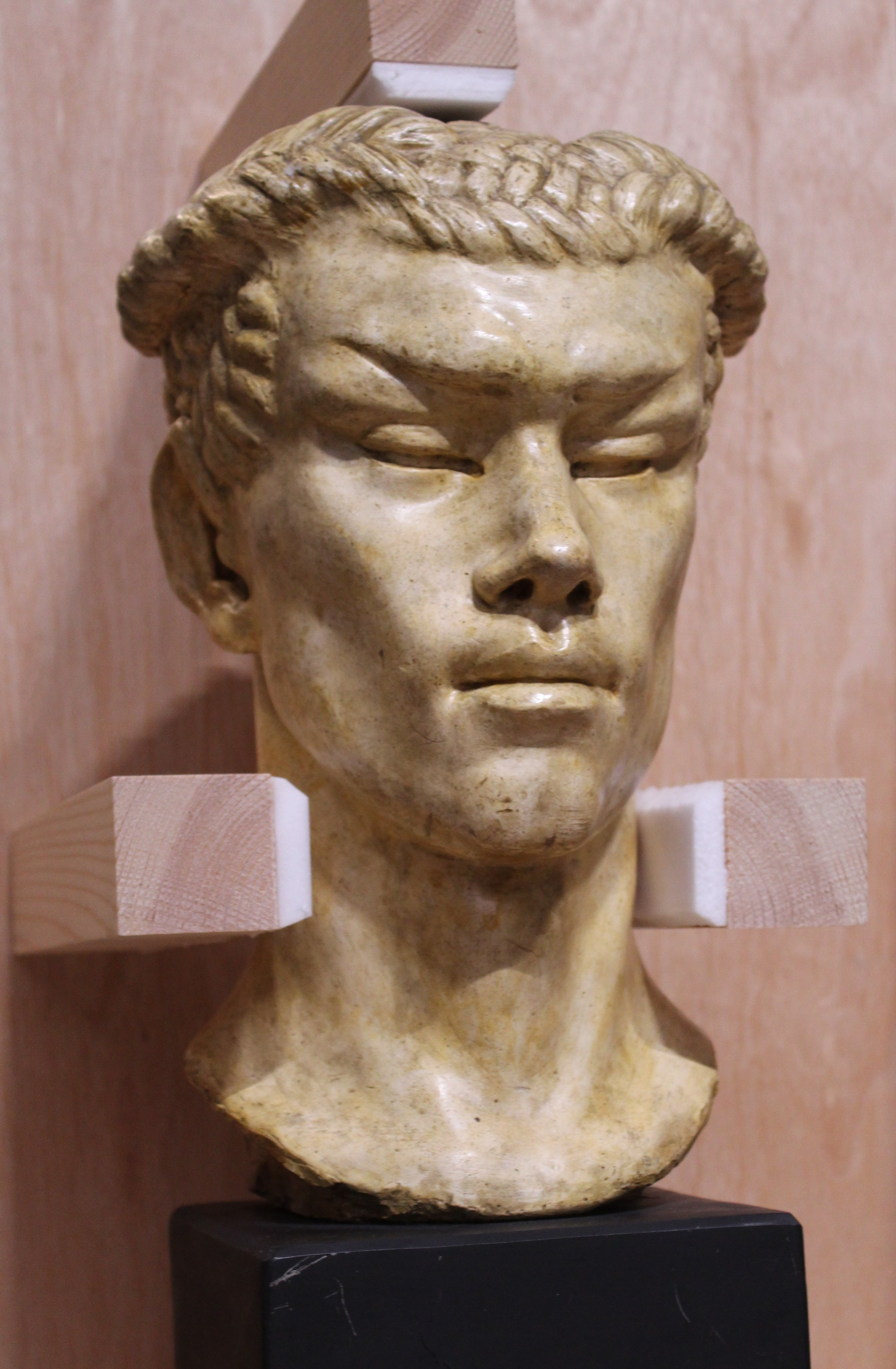
Bust of Nijinsky by Troubridge, 1912

In an effort to ease the great sense of guilt about Batten's death, Hall and Troubridge became interested in spiritualism. They regularly held séances with the use of a medium and believed that they received advice from Mabel, from beyond the grave. Both Troubridge and Hall identified as "inverts", a term used by sexologists such as Krafft-Ebing and Havelock Ellis usually to connote what is regarded as homosexuality.

The couple raised and showed dachshunds and griffons. The dachshunds shown in Romaine Brooks's portrait of Troubridge were a prize-winning pair given to her by Hall. In the last nine years of her life, Hall had become obsessed with a White Russian nurse, Evgenia Souline, a relationship which caused Troubridge unhappiness, but which she nonetheless tolerated. Initially, the women had decided to move to Italy and live in Florence but were forced to return at the outbreak of the Second World War. The three chose to live in Devon.

== After Radclyffe Hall's death ==
Despite all their troubles, Troubridge stayed with Hall and nursed her until she died in 1943. In the early 1920s, Troubridge adopted a tailored style similar to Hall's own masculine look as a way of making her sexual identity and their partnership visible. Later she came to prefer more feminine dress that complemented Hall's. After Hall died of rectal cancer in 1943, Troubridge had Hall's suits altered to fit her and wore them habitually.

On her deathbed, Hall revoked a previous will that had provided Souline with an income, and instead left everything to Troubridge, including the copyrights to her works. In her new will, she asked Troubridge to "make such provision for our friend Eugenie Souline as in her absolute discretion she may consider right"; Troubridge provided Souline with only a small allowance. She burned Souline's letters. In her 1945 biography, The Life and Death of Radclyffe Hall, she minimized Souline's role in Hall's life. Souline died in 1958.

Troubridge died in Rome in 1963. She left written instructions that her coffin be placed in the vault in Highgate Cemetery where Hall and Batten had been buried, but the instructions were discovered too late. She is buried in the Campo Verano Cemetery in Rome, Foreigners section, sector 38, a few meters due south of the Chapel of the College of St. Casimir. On her tombstone, removed in 2019 as the area was redeveloped, were inscribed a couplet from the Canticle of the Sun and the lines "There is no death - John Radclyffe Hall".
