= The Well of Loneliness =

1928 novel by Radclyffe Hall

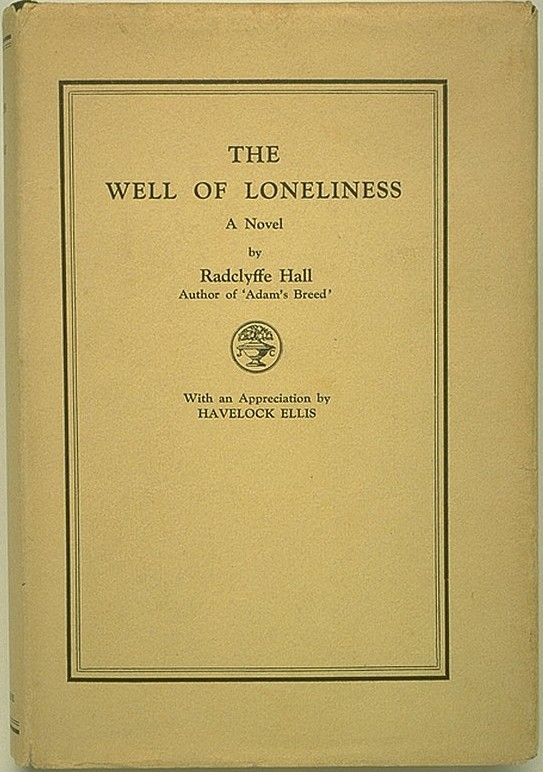
- Cover of the first edition
- Author: Radclyffe Hall
- Language: English
- Genre: Novel
- Publisher: Jonathan Cape
- Publication date: 27 July 1928
- Publication place: United Kingdom

The Well of Loneliness is a lesbian novel by British author Radclyffe Hall that was first published in 1928 by Jonathan Cape. (Note: In the United States, The Well of Loneliness was published by Covici-Friede.) It follows the life of Stephen Gordon, an Englishwoman from an upper-class family whose "sexual inversion" (homosexuality) is apparent from an early age. She finds love with Mary Llewellyn, whom she meets while serving as an ambulance driver during the First World War, but their happiness together is marred by social isolation and rejection, which Hall depicts as the typical sufferings of "inverts", with predictably debilitating effects. The novel portrays "inversion" as a natural, God-given state and makes an explicit plea: "Give us also the right to our existence".

Shortly after the book's publication, it became the target of a campaign by James Douglas, editor of the Sunday Express. Douglas wrote that "I would rather give a healthy boy or a healthy girl a phial of prussic acid than this novel." A British court judged it obscene because it defended "unnatural practices between women"; it was not published again in England until 1949. In the United States, the book survived legal challenges in New York state and in Customs Court.

Publicity over The Well of Loneliness's legal battles increased the visibility of lesbians in British and American culture. For decades it was the best-known lesbian novel in English, and often the first source of information about lesbianism that young people could find. Some readers have valued it, while others have criticised it for Stephen's expressions of self-hatred, and viewed it as inspiring shame. The novel was subject to great criticism in its time (some of which may have been motivated by prejudice) but has come to be recognised as a classic of lesbian literature.

The book entered the public domain in the United States in 2024.

== Background ==
In 1926, Radclyffe Hall was at the height of her career. Her novel Adam's Breed, about the spiritual awakening of an Italian headwaiter, had become a best-seller; it would soon win the Prix Femina and the James Tait Black Prize. She had long thought of writing a novel about sexual inversion; now, she believed, her literary reputation would allow such a work to be given a hearing. Since she knew she was risking scandal and "the shipwreck of her whole career", she sought and received the blessing of her partner, Una Troubridge, before she began work. Her goals were social and political; she wanted to end public silence about homosexuality and bring about "a more tolerant understanding" – as well as to "spur all classes of inverts to make good through hard work...and sober and useful living".

In April 1928, she told her editor that her new book would require complete commitment from its publisher and that she would not allow even one word to be altered. "I have put my pen at the service of some of the most persecuted and misunderstood people in the world...So far as I know nothing of the kind has ever been attempted before in fiction." One of the reasons Hall cited for making the book, was that she wanted to be the first person to "smash the conspiracy of silence" about sexual inversion.

== Social and cultural context ==
=== Parisian lesbian and gay subculture ===
Marie Antoinette's Temple of Love near the Petit Trianon, Versailles, where Stephen and Brockett visit

In Hall's time, Paris was known for having a relatively large and visible gay and lesbian community – in part because France, unlike England, had no laws against male homosexuality. Marcel Proust's novels continued in their influence upon 1920s Parisian society depicting lesbian and gay subculture. When Stephen first travels to Paris, at the urging of her friend Jonathan Brockett – who may be based on Noël Coward – she has not yet spoken about her inversion to anyone. Brockett, acting as tour guide, hints at a secret history of inversion in the city by referring to Marie Antoinette's rumoured relationship with the Princesse de Lamballe.

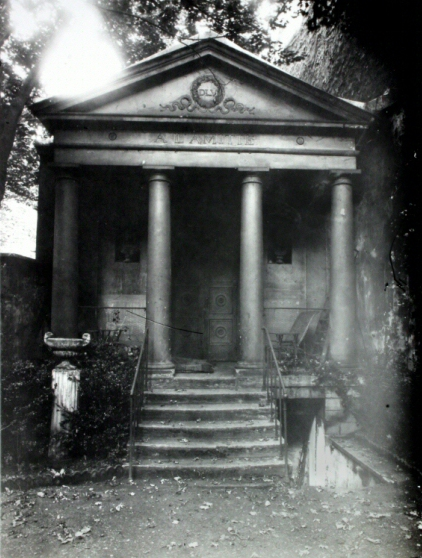
The Temple of Friendship at Natalie Barney's home at 20, Rue Jacob

Brockett next introduces Stephen to Valérie Seymour, who – like her prototype, Natalie Clifford Barney – is the hostess of a literary salon, many of whose guests are lesbians and gay men. Immediately after this meeting Stephen announces she has decided to settle in Paris at 35 Rue Jacob (purchased at Seymour's recommendation), with its temple in a corner of an overgrown garden. Barney lived and held her salon at 20 Rue Jacob. Stephen is wary of Valérie, and does not visit her salon until after the war, when Brockett persuades her that Mary is becoming too isolated. She finds Valérie to be an "indestructible creature" capable of bestowing a sense of self-respect on others, at least temporarily: "everyone felt very normal and brave when they gathered together at Valérie Seymour's". With Stephen's misgivings "drugged", she and Mary are drawn further into the "desolate country" of Paris gay life. At Alec's Bar – the worst in a series of depressing nightspots – they encounter "the battered remnants of men who...despised of the world, must despise themselves beyond all hope, it seemed, of salvation".

Many of those familiar with the subculture she described, including her own friends, disagreed with her portrayal of it; Romaine Brooks called her "a digger-up of worms with the pretension of a distinguished archaeologist". Hall's correspondence shows that the negative view of bars like Alec's that she expressed in The Well was sincerely meant, but she also knew that such bars did not represent the only homosexual communities in Paris. It is a commonplace of criticism that her own experience of lesbian life was not as miserable as Stephen's. By focusing on misery and describing its cause as "ceaseless persecution" by "the so-called just and righteous", she intensified the urgency of her plea for change.

=== World War I ===
Women of the Hackett Lowther Unit working on ambulances

Although Hall's author's note disclaims any real-world basis for the ambulance unit that Stephen joins, she drew heavily on the wartime experiences of her friend Toupie Lowther, co-commander of the only women's unit to serve on the front in France. Lowther, like Stephen, came from an aristocratic family, adopted a masculine style of dress, and was an accomplished fencer, tennis player, motorist and jujitsu enthusiast. In later years she said the character of Stephen was based on her, which may have been partly true.

In The Well of Loneliness, war work provides a publicly acceptable role for inverted women. The narrative voice asks that their contributions not be forgotten and predicts that they will not go back into hiding: "a battalion was formed in those terrible years that would never again be completely disbanded". This military metaphor continues later in the novel when inverts in postwar Paris are repeatedly referred to as a "miserable army". Hall invokes the image of the shell-shocked soldier to depict inverts as psychologically damaged by their outcast status: "for bombs do not trouble the nerves of the invert, but rather that terrible silent bombardment from the batteries of God's good people".

=== Christianity and spiritualism ===
Hall, who had converted to the Roman Catholic Church in 1912, was devoutly religious. She was also a believer in communication with the dead and had once hoped to become a medium – a fact that brought her into conflict with the church, which condemned spiritualism. Both these beliefs made their way into The Well of Loneliness.

Stephen, born on Christmas Eve and named after the first martyr of Christianity, dreams as a child that "in some queer way she [is] Jesus". When she discovers that Collins, object of her childhood crush, has housemaid's knee, she prays that the affliction be transferred to her: "I would like to wash Collins in my blood, Lord Jesus – I would like very much to be a Saviour to Collins – I love her, and I want to be hurt like You were". This childish desire for martyrdom prefigures Stephen's ultimate self-sacrifice for Mary's sake. After she tricks Mary into leaving her – carrying out a plan that leads Valérie to exclaim "you were made for a martyr!" – Stephen, left alone in her home, sees the room thronged with inverts, living, dead and unborn. They call on her to intercede with God for them and finally possess her. It is with their collective voice that she demands of God, "Give us also the right to our existence".

After Stephen reads Krafft-Ebing in her father's library, she opens the Bible at random, seeking a sign, and reads Genesis 4:15, "And the Lord set a mark upon Cain ..." Hall uses the mark of Cain, a sign of shame and exile, throughout the novel as a metaphor for the situation of inverts. Her defence of inversion took the form of a religious argument: God had created inverts, so humanity should accept them. The Well's use of religious imagery outraged the book's opponents, but Hall's vision of inversion as a God-given state was an influential contribution to the language of LGBT rights.

== Plot summary ==
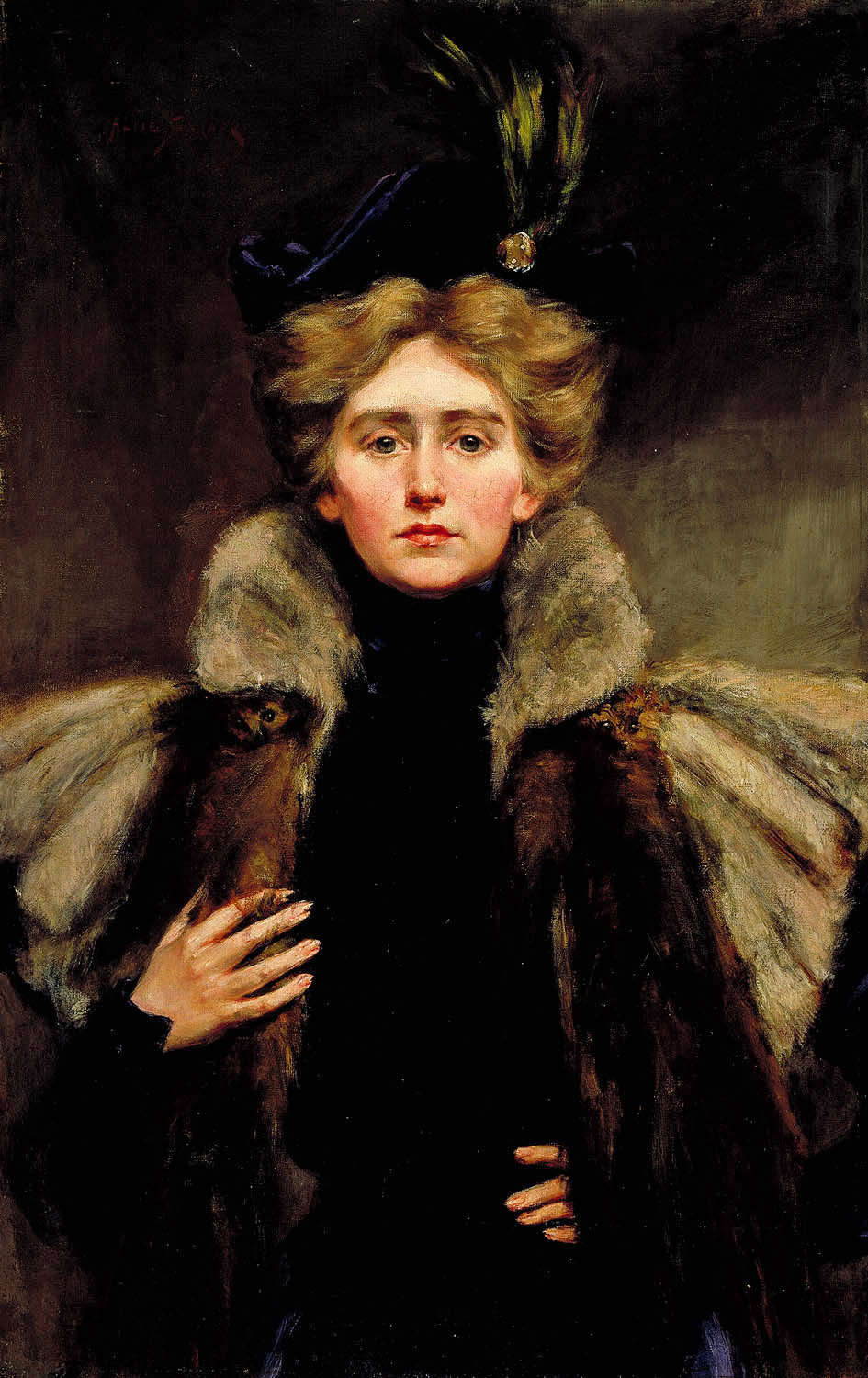
Natalie Barney, an American who lived in Paris and held a literary salon there, was the model for Valérie Seymour.

The book's protagonist, Stephen Gordon, is born in the late Victorian era to upper-class parents in Worcestershire who are expecting a boy and who christen her with the name they had already chosen. Even at birth she is physically unusual, a "narrow-hipped, wide-shouldered little tadpole of a baby". She hates dresses, wants to cut her hair short and longs to be a boy. At seven she develops a crush on a housemaid named Collins and is devastated when she sees Collins kissing a footman.

Stephen's father, Sir Phillip, dotes on her; he seeks to understand her through the writings of Karl Heinrich Ulrichs, the first modern writer to propose a theory of homosexuality, but does not share his findings with Stephen. Her mother, Lady Anna, is distant, seeing Stephen as a "blemished, unworthy, maimed reproduction" of Sir Phillip. At eighteen Stephen forms a close friendship with a Canadian man, Martin Hallam, but is horrified when he declares his love for her. The following winter Sir Phillip is crushed by a falling tree; at the last moment he tries to explain to Lady Anna that Stephen is an invert but dies without managing to do so.

Stephen begins to dress in masculine clothes made by a tailor rather than a dressmaker. At twenty-one she falls in love with Angela Crossby, the American wife of a new neighbour. Angela uses Stephen as an "anodyne against boredom", allowing her "a few rather schoolgirlish kisses". The pair conduct a relationship that, although not explicitly stated, seems to have some sexual element, at least for Stephen. Then Stephen discovers that Angela is having an affair with a man. Fearing exposure, Angela shows a letter from Stephen to her husband, who sends a copy to Stephen's mother. Lady Anna denounces Stephen for "presum[ing] to use the word love in connection with...these unnatural cravings of your unbalanced mind and undisciplined body." Stephen replies, "As my father loved you, I loved...It was good, good, good – I'd have laid down my life a thousand times over for Angela Crossby." After the argument Stephen goes to her father's study and for the first time opens his locked bookcase. She finds a book by Krafft-Ebing – assumed by critics to be Psychopathia Sexualis, a text about homosexuality and paraphilias – and, reading it, learns that she is an invert.

Stephen moves to London and writes a well-received first novel. Her second novel is less successful, and her friend, the playwright Jonathan Brockett, himself an invert, urges her to travel to Paris to improve her writing through a fuller experience of life. There she makes her first, brief contact with urban invert culture, meeting the lesbian salon hostess Valérie Seymour. During World War I she joins an ambulance unit, eventually serving at the front and earning the Croix de Guerre. She falls in love with a younger fellow driver, Mary Llewellyn, who comes to live with her after the war ends. They are happy at first, but Mary becomes lonely when Stephen returns to writing. Rejected by polite society, Mary throws herself into Parisian nightlife. Stephen believes Mary is becoming hardened and embittered and feels powerless to provide her with "a more normal and complete existence".

Martin Hallam, now living in Paris, rekindles his old friendship with Stephen. In time, he falls in love with Mary. Persuaded that she cannot give Mary happiness, Stephen pretends to have an affair with Valérie Seymour to drive her into Martin's arms. The novel ends with Stephen's plea to God: "Give us also the right to our existence!"

== Sexology ==
Hall describes The Well of Loneliness as "The first long and very serious novel entirely upon the subject of sexual inversion". She wrote The Well of Loneliness in part to popularise the ideas of sexologists such as Richard von Krafft-Ebing and Havelock Ellis, who regarded homosexuality as an inborn and unalterable trait: congenital sexual inversion.

In Krafft-Ebing's Psychopathia Sexualis (1886), the first book Stephen finds in her father's study, inversion is described as a degenerative disorder common in families with histories of mental illness. Exposure to these ideas leads Stephen to describe herself and other inverts as "hideously maimed and ugly". Later texts such as Sexual Inversion (1896) by Havelock Ellis – who contributed a foreword to The Well – described inversion simply as a difference, not as a defect. By 1901 Krafft-Ebing had adopted a similar view. Hall championed their ideas over those of the psychoanalysts, who saw homosexuality as a form of arrested psychological development, and some of whom believed it could be changed. Indeed, Havelock Ellis' commentary for the novel, which, although edited and censored to some extent, aligns the novel directly with theories of sexual inversion: "I have read The Well of Loneliness with great interest because—apart from its fine qualities as a novel by a writer of accomplished art—it possesses a notable psychological and sociological significance. So far as I know, it is the first English novel which presents, in a completely faithful and uncompromising form, one particular aspect of sexual life as it exists among us today. The relation of certain people, who, while different from their fellow human beings, are sometimes of the highest character and the finest aptitudes—to the often hostile society in which they move, presents difficult and still unresolved problems".

The term sexual inversion implied gender role reversal. Female inverts were, to a greater or lesser degree, inclined to traditionally male pursuits and dress; according to Krafft-Ebing, they had a "masculine soul". Krafft-Ebing believed that the most extreme inverts also exhibited reversal of secondary sex characteristics; Ellis's research had not demonstrated any such physical differences, but he devoted a great deal of study to the search for them. The idea appears in The Well in Stephen's unusual proportions at birth and in the scene set at Valerie Seymour's salon, where "the timbre of a voice, the build of an ankle, the texture of a hand" reveals the inversion of the guests.

== Social impact and legacy ==
=== Awareness of homosexuality in society ===
In 1921, Lord Birkenhead, the Lord High Chancellor of Great Britain, had opposed a bill that would have criminalised lesbianism on the grounds that "of every thousand women ... 999 have never even heard a whisper of these practices". In reality, awareness of lesbianism had been gradually increasing since World War I, but it was still a subject most people had never heard of, or perhaps just preferred to ignore. The Well of Loneliness made sexual inversion a subject of household conversation for the first time. The banning of the book drew so much attention to the very subject it was intended to suppress that it left British authorities wary of further attempts to censor books for lesbian content. In 1935, after a complaint about a health book entitled The Single Woman and Her Emotional Problems, a Home Office memo noted: "It is notorious that the prosecution of the Well of Loneliness resulted in infinitely greater publicity about lesbianism than if there had been no prosecution."

In a study of a working-class lesbian community in Buffalo, New York, in the 1940s and 1950s, The Well of Loneliness was the only work of lesbian literature anyone had read or heard of. For many young lesbians in the 1950s, it was the only source of information about lesbianism. The Well's name recognition made it possible to find when bookstores and libraries did not yet have sections devoted to LGBT literature. As late as 1994, an article in Feminist Review noted that The Well "regularly appears in coming-out stories – and not just those of older lesbians". It has often been mocked: Terry Castle says that "like many bookish lesbians I seem to have spent much of my adult life making jokes about it", and Mary Renault, who read it in 1938, remembered laughing at its "earnest humourlessness" and "impermissible allowance of self-pity". Yet it has also produced powerful emotional responses, both positive and negative. One woman was so angry at the thought of how The Well would affect an "isolated emerging lesbian" that she "wrote a note in the library book, to tell other readers that women loving women can be beautiful". A Holocaust survivor said, "Remembering that book, I wanted to live long enough to kiss another woman."

=== Clothing and sexuality ===
James Douglas illustrated his denunciation of The Well with a photograph of Radclyffe Hall in a silk smoking jacket and bow tie, holding a cigarette and monocle. She was also wearing a straight knee-length skirt, but later Sunday Express articles cropped the photo so tightly that it became difficult to tell she was not wearing trousers. Hall's style of dress was not scandalous in the 1920s; short hairstyles were common, and the combination of tailored jackets and short skirts was a recognised fashion, discussed in magazines as the "severely masculine" look. Some lesbians, like Hall, adopted variations of the style as a way of signalling their sexuality, but it was a code that only a few knew how to read. With the controversy over The Well of Loneliness, Hall became the public face of sexual inversion, and all women who favoured masculine fashions came under new scrutiny. Lesbian journalist Evelyn Irons – who considered Hall's style of dress "rather effeminate" compared to her own – said that after the publication of The Well, truck drivers would call out on the street to any woman who wore a collar and tie: "Oh, you're Miss Radclyffe Hall". Some welcomed their newfound visibility: when Hall spoke at a luncheon in 1932, the audience was full of women who had imitated her look. But in a study of lesbian women in Salt Lake City in the 1920s and '30s, nearly all regretted the publication of The Well because it had drawn unwanted attention to them.

=== Negative portrayal of the feminine lesbian ===
In the 1970s and early '80s, when lesbian feminists rejected the butch and femme identities that Hall's novel had helped to define, writers like Jane Rule and Blanche Wiesen Cook criticised The Well for defining lesbianism in terms of masculinity, as well as for presenting lesbian life as "joyless".

Furthermore, The Well arguably embodies what modern readers may regard as misogynistic and biphobic ideas in its presentation of the femme women who experience attraction towards Stephen but eventually end up in heterosexual relationships. Mary's femininity, in particular, is belittled by Hall's presentation of her: She is not Stephen's equal in age, education, family, or wealth, and so is constantly infantilised by her lover. This, coupled with Mary's dependence on Stephen, seems to emphasise the supposed inferiority of the feminine to the masculine. As Clare Hemmings argues, Mary is merely used as "a means for Stephen to reach her own understanding of the true nature of the deviant's plight".

Moreover, Hemmings continues that both Mary and Angela represent the "'traitorous femme' who remains untrustworthy as she may leave you [her female lover] for a man".

=== Bisexuality ===
The understanding of sexuality represented in the novel is considered strictly in binary terms and exists within misogynistic stereotypes that were prevalent when the novel was published. This contributes to the undertones of biphobia that are present in the treatment of the femme characters that exhibit female-female sexual attraction, especially so in the treatment of Mary. These choices could be partly explained by the understanding of the term bisexuality at the time. During the interwar period the definition was most often understood as a scientific term describing a psychological gender duality, rather than referencing a sexual preference. In other words, the term was used as a scientific neologism for androgyny, and related to understandings of gender and sex, but not to sexual preferences. Some women in this period ascribed to the theory of Otto Weininger, who suggested that those attracted to others of their own sex were born neither male nor female, but both: they were "sexually intermediate types". This theory posited that "the woman who attracts and is attracted by other women is herself half male" and that "homo-sexuality in a woman is the outcome of her masculinity and presupposes a higher degree of development".

=== Conflations between sexuality and gender ===
Other criticism focuses on the potential confusion of sexuality with gender in the novel. Jay Prosser argues that in "rightly tracing Hall's debt to nineteenth-century sexologists, critics have wrongly reduced sexual inversion to homosexuality." What many refer to as Stephen's 'butch lesbianism', Prosser suggests, is actually a transgender identity. As a child, Stephen insists that she is male – "Yes, of course I'm a boy … I must be a boy 'cause I feel exactly like one", – and, when talking to their mother, Stephen says that "All my life I've never felt like a woman, and you know it." Through Stephen's final rejection of Mary, ostensibly so that Mary can participate in a heterosexual relationship with Martin and therefore have a more secure life, Prosser surmises that "Stephen affirms her identification with the heterosexual man".

Esther Newton, writing in 1989, provides a different perspective of Hall's seemingly confusing depiction of Stephen's lesbianism and its conflation with her gender, hinging her discussion on understanding The Well in its historical and social context. Newton argues that "Hall and many other feminists like her embraced [...] the image of the mannish lesbian [...] primarily because they desperately wanted to break out of the asexual model of romantic friendship" prevalent in the nineteenth century. Sex was seen as something that "could only occur in the presence of an imperial and imperious penis", such that sex between women was simply not recognised to exist. Newton shows how sexologists of the time, like Ellis, echoes this sentiment, where his "antifeminism and reluctance to see active lust in women committed him to fusing inversion and masculinity". In a society "very conscious of sex and its vast importance", Stephen feels excluded from the rigid, feminine role imposed on her as a biological female. Hence, for Stephen's lesbianism to be recognised by the readers in that time, Hall had to deliberately show Stephen "enter(ing) the male world, [...] as a lesbian in male body drag", which simultaneously enabled the feminine women in the novel to demonstrate their lesbianism through "association with their masculine partners".

The novel has had its defenders among feminists in the academy, such as Alison Hennegan, pointing out that the novel did raise awareness of homosexuality among the British public and cleared the way for later work that tackled gay and lesbian issues.

In more recent criticism, critics have tended to focus on the novel's historical context, but The Well's reputation as "the most depressing lesbian novel ever written" persists and is still controversial. Some critics see the book as reinforcing homophobic beliefs, while others argue that the book's tragedy and its depiction of shame are its most compelling aspects.

The Well's ideas and attitudes now strike many readers as dated, and few critics praise its literary quality. Nevertheless, it continues to compel critical attention, to provoke strong identification and intense emotional reactions in some readers, and to elicit a high level of personal engagement from its critics.

== Publication and contemporary response ==
Three publishers praised The Well but turned it down. Hall's agent then sent the manuscript to Jonathan Cape who, though cautious about publishing a controversial book, saw the potential for a commercial success. Cape tested the waters with a small print run of 1500 copies, priced at 15 shillings – about twice the cost of an average novel – to make it less attractive to sensation-seekers. Publication, originally scheduled for late 1928, was brought forward when he discovered that another novel with a lesbian theme, Compton Mackenzie's Extraordinary Women, was to be published in September. Though the two books proved to have little in common, Hall and Cape saw Extraordinary Women as a competitor and wanted to beat it to market. The Well appeared on 27 July, in a black cover with a plain jacket. Cape sent review copies only to newspapers and magazines he thought would handle the subject matter non-sensationally.

Early reviews were mixed. Some critics found the novel too preachy; others, including Leonard Woolf, thought it was poorly structured, or complained of sloppiness in style. There was praise for its sincerity and artistry, and some expressed sympathy with Hall's moral argument. In the three weeks after the book appeared in bookstores, no reviewer called for its suppression or suggested that it should not have been published. A review in T.P.'s & Cassell's Weekly foresaw no difficulties for The Well: "One cannot say what effect this book will have on the public attitude of silence or derision, but every reader will agree with Mr. Havelock Ellis in the preface, that 'the poignant situations are set forth with a complete absence of offence.'"

Papers from the author's archive, which are set to be digitised by the Harry Ransom Center at the University of Texas alongside those of her partner, the artist Una Vincenzo, Lady Troubridge, show that the novel was supported by thousands of readers, who wrote to Hall in outrage at the ban.

== Possible autobiography ==
Although Hall's childhood bore little resemblance to Stephen's life, in the 1970s and 1980s, some writers such as Hall's early biographers Lovat Dickson and Richard Ormrod had treated The Well of Loneliness as a thinly veiled autobiography. (Note: According to William Fitzgerald, speculation over The Well of Loneliness' autobiographical aspects date back to the book's initial publication.) Angela Crossby may be a composite of various women with whom Hall had affairs in her youth, but Mary, whose lack of outside interests leaves her idle when Stephen is working, does not resemble Hall's partner Una Troubridge, an accomplished sculptor who translated Colette's novels into English. Hall said she drew on herself only for the "fundamental emotions that are characteristic of the inverted".

== Sunday Express campaign ==
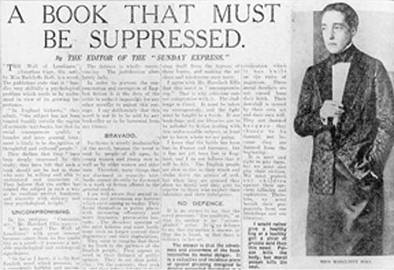
Radclyffe Hall's image in a Sunday Express column about the novel

One critic who did take offence to The Well was James Douglas, editor of the Sunday Express. Douglas was a dedicated moralist and an exponent of muscular Christianity, a movement which sought to reinvigorate the Church of England by promoting physical health and manliness. His colourfully worded editorials on subjects such as "the flapper vote" (that is, the extension of suffrage to women under 30) and "modern sex novelists" helped the Express family of papers prosper in the cutthroat circulation wars of the late 1920s. These leader articles (editorials) shared the pages of the Sunday Express with gossip, murderers' confessions, and features about the love affairs of great men and women of the past.

[T]he adroitness and cleverness of the book intensifies its moral danger. It is a seductive and insidious piece of special pleading designed to display perverted decadence as a martyrdom inflicted upon these outcasts by a cruel society. It flings a veil of sentiment over their depravity. It even suggests that their self-made debasement is unavoidable, because they cannot save themselves.

— Douglas, James (19 August 1928). "A Book That Must Be Suppressed". Sunday Express.

Douglas's campaign against The Well of Loneliness began on 18 August, with poster and billboard advertising and a teaser in the Daily Express promising to expose "A Book That Should Be Suppressed". In his editorial the next day, Douglas wrote that "sexual inversion and perversion" had already become too visible and that the publication of The Well brought home the need for society to "cleans[e] itself from the leprosy of these lepers". For Douglas the sexological view of homosexuality was pseudoscience, incompatible with the Christian doctrine of free will; instead, he argued, homosexuals were damned by their own choice – which meant that others could be corrupted by "their propaganda". Above all, children must be protected: "I would rather give a healthy boy or a healthy girl a phial of prussic acid than this novel. Poison kills the body, but moral poison kills the soul." He called on the publishers to withdraw the book and the Home Secretary to take action if they did not. (The comparison between pornography and poison was made by Lord Chief Justice, Lord Campbell, on introducing the Obscene Publications Act 1857.)

In what Hall described as an act of "imbecility coupled with momentary panic", Jonathan Cape sent a copy of The Well to the Home Secretary for his opinion, offering to withdraw the book if it would be in the public interest to do so. The Home Secretary was William Joynson-Hicks, a Conservative known for his crackdowns on alcohol, nightclubs and gambling, as well as for his opposition to a revised version of The Book of Common Prayer. He took only two days to reply that The Well was "gravely detrimental to the public interest"; if Cape did not withdraw it voluntarily, criminal proceedings would be brought.

Cape announced that he had stopped publication, but he secretly leased the rights to Pegasus Press, an English-language publisher in France. His partner Wren Howard took papier-mâché moulds of the type to Paris, and by 28 September, Pegasus Press was shipping its edition to the London bookseller Leopold Hill, who acted as distributor. With publicity increasing demand, sales were brisk, but the reappearance of The Well on bookshop shelves soon came to the attention of the Home Office. On 3 October Joynson-Hicks issued a warrant for shipments of the book to be seized.

One consignment of 250 copies was stopped at Dover. Then the Chairman of the Board of Customs balked. He had read The Well and considered it a fine book, not at all obscene; he wanted no part of suppressing it. On 19 October he released the seized copies for delivery to Leopold Hill's premises, where the Metropolitan Police were waiting with a search warrant. Hill and Cape were summoned to appear at Bow Street Magistrates' Court to show cause why the book should not be destroyed.

=== Response ===
From its beginning, the Sunday Express's campaign drew the attention of other papers. Some backed Douglas, including the Sunday Chronicle, The People and Truth. The Daily News and Westminster Gazette ran a review that, without commenting on Douglas's action, said the novel "present[ed] as a martyr a woman in the grip of a vice". Most of the British press defended The Well. The Nation suggested that the Sunday Express had only started its campaign because it was August, the journalistic silly season when good stories are scarce. Country Life and Lady's Pictorial both ran positive reviews. Arnold Dawson of the Daily Herald, a Labour newspaper, called Douglas a "stunt journalist"; he said no one would give the book to a child, no child would want to read it, and any who did would find nothing harmful. Dawson also printed a scathing condemnation of the Home Office by H. G. Wells and George Bernard Shaw and started a counter-campaign that helped Hall obtain statements of support from the National Union of Railwaymen and the South Wales Miners' Federation.

A novelist may not wish to treat any of the subjects mentioned above but the sense that they are prohibited or prohibitable, that there is a taboo-list, will work on him and will make him alert and cautious instead of surrendering himself to his creative impulses. And he will tend to cling to subjects that are officially acceptable, such as murder and adultery, and to shun anything original lest it bring him into forbidden areas.

— E. M. Forster and Virginia Woolf, letter to The Nation and Athenaeum

Leonard Woolf and E. M. Forster drafted a letter of protest against the suppression of The Well, assembling a list of supporters that included Shaw, T. S. Eliot, Arnold Bennett, Vera Brittain and Ethel Smyth. According to Virginia Woolf, the plan broke down when Hall objected to the wording of the letter, insisting it mention her book's "artistic merit – even genius". The Well's sentimental romanticism, traditional form, and lofty style – using words like withal, betoken and hath – did not appeal to Modernist aesthetics; not all those willing to defend it on grounds of literary freedom were equally willing to praise its artistry. The petition dwindled to a short letter in The Nation and Athenaeum, signed by Forster and Virginia Woolf, that focused on the chilling effects of censorship on writers.

=== UK trial ===
The obscenity trial began on 9 November 1928. Cape's solicitor Harold Rubinstein sent out 160 letters to potential witnesses. Many were reluctant to appear in court; according to Virginia Woolf, "they generally put it down to the weak heart of a father, or a cousin who is about to have twins". About 40 turned up on the day of the trial, including Woolf herself, Forster, and such diverse figures as biologist Julian Huxley, Laurence Housman of the British Sexological Society, Robert Cust JP of the London Morality Council, Charles Ricketts of the Royal Academy of Art and Rabbi Joseph Frederick Stern of the East London Synagogue. Norman Haire, who was the star witness after Havelock Ellis bowed out, declared that homosexuality ran in families and a person could no more become it by reading books than if he could become syphilitic by reading about syphilis. None were allowed to offer their views of the novel. Under the Obscene Publications Act 1857, Chief Magistrate Sir Chartres Biron could decide whether the book was obscene without hearing any testimony on the question. "I don't think people are entitled to express an opinion upon a matter which is the decision of the court," he said. Since Hall herself was not on trial, she did not have the right to her own counsel, and Cape's barrister Norman Birkett had persuaded her not to give evidence herself.

Birkett arrived in court two hours late. In his defence, he tried to claim that the relationships between women in The Well of Loneliness were purely platonic in nature. Biron replied, "I have read the book." Hall had urged Birkett before the trial not to "sell the inverts in our defence". She took advantage of a lunch recess to tell him that if he continued to maintain her book had no lesbian content she would stand up in court and tell the magistrate the truth before anyone could stop her. Birkett was forced to retract. He argued instead that the book was tasteful and possessed a high degree of literary merit. James Melville, appearing for Leopold Hill, took a similar line: the book was "written in a reverend spirit", not to inspire libidinous thoughts but to examine a social question. The theme itself should not be forbidden, and the book's treatment of its theme was unexceptionable.

[Stephen] writes to her mother in these terms: "You insulted what to me is natural and sacred." "What to me is sacred"? Natural and sacred! Then I am asked to say that this book is in no sense a defence of unnatural practices between women, or a glorification, or a praise of them, to put it perhaps not quite so strongly. "Natural" and "Sacred"! "Good" repeated three times.

— Sir Chartres Biron's judgment

In his judgement, issued on 16 November, Biron applied the Hicklin test of obscenity: a work was obscene if it tended to "deprave and corrupt those whose minds are open to such immoral influences". He held that the book's literary merit was irrelevant because a well-written obscene book was even more harmful than a poorly written one. The topic in itself was not necessarily unacceptable; a book that depicted the "moral and physical degradation which indulgence in those vices must necessary involve" might be allowed, but no reasonable person could say that a plea for the recognition and toleration of inverts was not obscene. He ordered the book destroyed, with the defendants to pay court costs.

=== Appeal ===
Hill and Cape appealed to the London Court of Quarter Sessions. The prosecutor, Attorney General Sir Thomas Inskip, solicited testimony from biological and medical experts and from the writer Rudyard Kipling. But when Kipling appeared on the morning of the trial, Inskip told him he would not be needed. James Melville had wired the defence witnesses the night before to tell them not to come in. The panel of twelve magistrates who heard the appeal had to rely on passages Inskip read to them for knowledge of the book, since the Director of Public Prosecutions had refused to release copies for them to read. After deliberating for only five minutes, they upheld Biron's decision.

=== The Sink of Solitude ===
The Sink of Solitude, an anonymous lampoon in verse by "several hands", appeared in late 1928. It satirised both sides of the controversy over The Well of Loneliness, but its primary targets were Douglas and Joynson-Hicks, "Two Good Men – never mind their intellect". Though the introduction, by journalist P. R. Stephensen, described The Well's moral argument as "feeble" and dismissed Havelock Ellis as a "psychopath", The Sink itself endorsed the view that lesbianism was innate. It portrayed Hall as a humourless moralist who had a great deal in common with the opponents of her novel. One illustration, picking up on the theme of religious martyrdom in The Well, showed Hall nailed to a cross. The image horrified Hall; her guilt at being depicted in a drawing that she saw as blasphemous led to her choice of a religious subject for her next novel, The Master of the House.

=== Subsequent publication and availability ===
The Pegasus Press edition of the book remained available in France, and some copies made their way into the UK. In a "Letter from Paris" in The New Yorker, Janet Flanner reported that it sold most heavily at the news vendor's cart that served passengers travelling to London on La Fleche D'Or.

In 1946, three years after Hall's death, Troubridge wanted to include The Well in a Collected Memorial Edition of Hall's works. Peter Davies of the Windmill Press wrote to the Home Office's legal adviser to ask whether the post-war Labour administration would allow the book to be republished. Unknown to Troubridge, he added a postscript saying "I am not really anxious to do The Well of Loneliness and am rather relieved than otherwise by any lack of enthusiasm I may encounter in official circles." Home Secretary James Chuter Ede told Troubridge that any publisher reprinting the book would risk prosecution. In 1949, Falcon Press brought out an edition with no legal challenge. The Well has been in print continuously ever since and has been translated into at least fourteen languages. In the 1960s it was still selling 100,000 copies a year in the United States alone. Looking back on the controversy in 1972, Flanner remarked on how unlikely it seemed that a "rather innocent" book like The Well could have created such a scandal. In 1974, it was read to the British public on BBC Radio 4's Book at Bedtime. In May 1999, a dramatized version was broadcast on BBC Radio 4 and has since been repeated on Radio 4 Extra.

== US publication and trial ==
Alfred A. Knopf, Inc. had planned to publish The Well of Loneliness in the United States at the same time as Cape in the United Kingdom. But after Cape brought forward the publication date, Knopf found itself in the position of publishing a book that had been withdrawn in its home country. They refused, telling Hall that nothing they could do would keep the book from being treated as pornography.

Cape sold the US rights to the recently formed publishing house of Pascal Covici and Donald Friede. Friede had heard gossip about The Well at a party at Theodore Dreiser's house and immediately decided to acquire it. He had previously sold a copy of Dreiser's An American Tragedy to a Boston police officer to create a censorship test case, which he had lost; he was awaiting an appeal, which he would also lose. He took out a $10,000 bank loan to outbid another publisher which had offered a $7,500 advance, and enlisted Morris Ernst, co-founder of the American Civil Liberties Union, to defend the book against legal challenges. Friede invited John Saxton Sumner of the New York Society for the Suppression of Vice to buy a copy directly from him, to ensure that he, not a bookseller, would be the one prosecuted. He also travelled to Boston to give a copy to the Watch and Ward Society, hoping both to further challenge censorship of literature and to generate more publicity; he was disappointed when they told him they saw nothing wrong with the book.

In New York, Sumner and several police detectives seized 865 copies of The Well from the publisher's offices, and Friede was charged with selling an obscene publication. But Covici and Friede had already moved the printing plates out of New York in order to continue publishing the book. By the time the case came to trial, it had already been reprinted six times. Despite its price of $5 – twice the cost of an average novel – it sold more than 100,000 copies in its first year.

In the US, as in the UK, the Hicklin test of obscenity applied, but New York case law had established that books should be judged by their effects on adults rather than on children and that literary merit was relevant. When defending The Well, Ernst argued that because lesbianism itself was not an obscene subject, the book did not have any sexual explicitness. Ernst obtained statements from authors including Dreiser, Ernest Hemingway, F. Scott Fitzgerald, Edna St. Vincent Millay, Sinclair Lewis, Sherwood Anderson, H. L. Mencken, Upton Sinclair, Ellen Glasgow and John Dos Passos. Besides, freedom of expression was protected by the First Amendment of the United States Constitution. To make sure these supporters did not go unheard, he incorporated their opinions into his brief. His argument relied on a comparison with Mademoiselle de Maupin by Théophile Gautier, which had been cleared of obscenity in the 1922 case Halsey v. New York. Mademoiselle de Maupin described a lesbian relationship in more explicit terms than The Well did. According to Ernst, The Well had greater social value because it was more serious in tone and made a case against misunderstanding and intolerance.

In an opinion issued on 19 February 1929, Magistrate Hyman Bushel declined to take the book's literary qualities into account and said The Well was "calculated to deprave and corrupt minds open to its immoral influences". Under New York law, Bushel was not a trier of fact; he could only remand the case to the New York Court of Special Sessions for judgement. On 19 April, that court issued a three-paragraph decision stating that The Well's theme – a "delicate social problem" – did not violate the law unless written in such a way as to make it obscene. After "a careful reading of the entire book", they cleared it of all charges.

Covici-Friede then imported a copy of the Pegasus Press edition from France as a further test case and to solidify the book's US copyright. Customs barred the book from entering the country, which might also have prevented it from being shipped from state to state. Two months later in July, the United States Customs Court ruled that the book did not contain "one word, phrase, sentence or paragraph which could be truthfully pointed out as offensive to modesty".

== Other 1928 lesbian novels ==
Three other novels with lesbian themes were published in England in 1928: Elizabeth Bowen's The Hotel, Virginia Woolf's Orlando and Compton Mackenzie's satirical novel Extraordinary Women. None was banned. The Hotel, like earlier English novels in which critics have identified lesbian themes, is marked by complete reticence, while Orlando may have been protected by its Modernist playfulness. The Home Office considered prosecuting Extraordinary Women, but concluded that it lacked the "earnestness" of The Well and would not inspire readers to adopt "the practices referred to". Mackenzie was disappointed; he had hoped a censorship case would increase his book's sales. Despite advertising that tried to cash in on the controversy over The Well by announcing that Radclyffe Hall was the model for one of the characters, it sold only 2,000 copies.

A fourth 1928 novel, Ladies Almanack by the American writer Djuna Barnes, not only contains a character based on Radclyffe Hall but includes passages that may be a response to The Well. Ladies Almanack is a roman à clef of a lesbian literary and artistic circle in Paris, written in an archaic, Rabelaisian style and starring Natalie Barney as Dame Evangeline Musset. Much as Sir Phillip paces his study worrying about Stephen, Dame Musset's father "pac[es] his library in the most normal of Night-Shirts". When, unlike Sir Phillip, he confronts his daughter, she replies confidently: "Thou, good Governor, wast expecting a Son when you lay atop of your Choosing ... Am I not doing after your very Desire, and is it not the more commendable, seeing that I do it without the Tools for the Trade, and yet nothing complain?" Ladies Almanack is far more overtly sexual than The Well; its cryptic style, full of in-jokes and ornate language, may have been intended to disguise its content from censors. It could not in any case be prosecuted by the Home Office, since it was published only in France, in a small, privately printed edition. It did not become widely available until 1972.

== Adaptations and derivative works ==
Willette Kershaw, an American actress who was staging banned plays in Paris, proposed a dramatisation of The Well of Loneliness. Hall accepted a £100 advance, but when she and Troubridge saw Kershaw act, they found her too feminine for the role of Stephen. Hall tried to void the contract on a technicality, but Kershaw refused to change her plans. The play opened on 2 September 1930. No playwright was credited, implying that Hall had written the adaptation herself; it was actually written by one of Kershaw's ex-husbands, who reworked the story to make it more upbeat. According to Janet Flanner, who reported on the opening night for The New Yorker, Kershaw "made up in costume what she lacked in psychology", with designer boots, breeches and riding crop. Then she changed into a white dress for a final speech in which she "begged humanity, 'already used to earthquakes and murderers', to try to put up with a minor calamity like the play's and the book's Lesbian protagonist, Stephen Gordon". Hall threatened a lawsuit to stop the production, but the issue soon became moot, since the play closed after only a few nights. The public skirmish between Hall and Kershaw increased sales of the novel.

A 1951 French film set in a girls' boarding school was released in the United States as The Pit of Loneliness to capitalise on the notoriety of The Well, but was actually adapted from the novel Olivia, now known to have been written by Dorothy Bussy. A mid-1930s exploitation film, Children of Loneliness, stated it was "inspired by" The Well. Little of Hall's novel can be discerned in its story of a butch lesbian who is blinded with acid and run over by a truck, freeing the naïve young roommate she seduced to find love with a fullback. A critic for the Motion Picture Herald reported that during the film's run in Los Angeles in 1937 – as a double feature with Love Life of a Gorilla – a self-identified "doctor" appeared after the screening to sell pamphlets purporting to explain homosexuality. He was arrested for selling obscene literature.

In 1985, the Mexican writer and social activist Nancy Cárdenas produced a play based on the novel. The play was staged in Mexico City's Fru Fru Theatre and was performed by Irma Serrano and Sonia Infante.

== Sources ==
- Baker, Michael (1985). Our Three Selves: A Life of Radclyffe Hall. London: GMP Publishers Ltd. ISBN 978-0-85449-042-4.
- Baker, Simon (4 October 2005). "How Censors Held Line against Lesbians". The Sydney Morning Herald.
- Barale, Michèle Aina (1991). "Below the Belt: (Un)Covering The Well of Loneliness". In Fuss, Diana (ed.). Inside/Out: Lesbian Theories, Gay Theories. New York: Routledge. pp. 235–258. ISBN 978-0-415-90237-3.
- Barrios, Richard (2003). Screened Out: Playing Gay in Hollywood from Edison to Stonewall. New York: Routledge. ISBN 978-0-415-92328-6.
- Barnes, Djuna (1992). Ladies Almanack. New York: New York University Press. ISBN 978-0-8147-1180-4. Includes an introduction by Susan Sniader Lanser.
- Bullough, Vern; Bullough, Bonnie (1977). "Lesbianism in the 1920s and 1930s: A Newfound Study". Signs. 2 (4): 895–904. doi:10.1086/493419. ISSN 0097-9740. PMID 21213641. S2CID 145652567.
- Castle, Terry (1993). The Apparitional Lesbian: Female Homosexuality and Modern Culture. New York: Columbia University Press. ISBN 978-0-231-07652-4.
- Cline, Sally (1998). Radclyffe Hall: A Woman Called John. Woodstock & New York: The Overlook Press. ISBN 978-0-87951-708-3.
- Cohler, Deborah (2000). "Judging a Book by Its... Price, Distribution, and Lesbian Representation in 1928". 2000 MLA Convention: Economies of Writing.
- Cook, Blanche Wiesen (1979). "'Women Alone Stir My Imagination': Lesbianism and the Cultural Tradition". Signs. 4 (4): 718–739. doi:10.1086/493659. ISSN 0097-9740. S2CID 144924349.
- Doan, Laura (2001). Fashioning Sapphism: The Origins of a Modern English Lesbian Culture. New York: Columbia University Press. ISBN 978-0-231-11007-5.
- Doan, Laura (2004). "Sappho's Apotheosis? Radclyffe Hall's Queer Kinship with the Watchdogs of the Lord". Sexuality & Culture. 8 (2): 80–106. doi:10.1007/s12119-004-1013-2. ISSN 1095-5143. S2CID 145762089.
- Doan, Laura; Prosser, Jay, eds. (2001). Palatable Poison: Critical Perspectives on The Well of Loneliness. New York: Columbia University Press. ISBN 978-0-231-11875-0.
  - Biron, Sir Chartres (1928). "Judgment". In Doan; Prosser (eds.). Palatable Poison. pp. 39–49.
  - Castle, Terry (2001). "Afterword: It Was Good, Good, Good". In Doan; Prosser (eds.). Palatable Poison. pp. 394–402.
  - Douglas, James (1928). "A Book That Must Be Suppressed". In Doan; Prosser (eds.). Palatable Poison. pp. 36–38.
  - Halberstam, Judith (2001). "'A Writer of Misfits': 'John' Radclyffe Hall and the Discourse of Inversion". In Doan; Prosser (eds.). Palatable Poison. pp. 145–161.
  - Hemmings, Clare (2001). "'All My Life I've Been Waiting for Something...': Theorizing Femme Narrative in The Well of Loneliness". In Doan; Prosser (eds.). Palatable Poison. pp. 179–196.
  - Kent, Susan Kingsley (2001). "The Well of Loneliness as War Novel". In Doan; Prosser (eds.). Palatable Poison. pp. 216–231.
  - Medd, Jodie (2001). "War Wounds: The Nation, Shell Shock, and Psychoanalysis in The Well of Loneliness". In Doan; Prosser (eds.). Palatable Poison. pp. 232–254.
  - Munt, Sally R. (2001). "The Well of Shame". In Doan; Prosser (eds.). Palatable Poison. pp. 199–215.
  - Newton, Esther (1984). "The Mythic Mannish Lesbian: Radclyffe Hall and The New Woman". In Doan; Prosser (eds.). Palatable Poison. pp. 89–109.
  - Prosser, Jay (2001). "'Some Primitive Thing Conceived in a Turbulent Age of Transition': The Transsexual Emerging from The Well". In Doan; Prosser (eds.). Palatable Poison. pp. 129–144.
  - Rosner, Victoria (2001). "Once More unto the Breach: The Well of Loneliness and the Spaces of Inversion". In Doan; Prosser (eds.). Palatable Poison. pp. 316–335.
  - Rule, Jane (1975). "Radclyffe Hall". In Doan; Prosser (eds.). Palatable Poison. pp. 77–88.
  - Winning, Joanne (2001). "Writing by the Light of The Well: Radclyffe Hall and the Lesbian Modernists". In Doan; Prosser (eds.). Palatable Poison. pp. 372–393.
- Dunn, Sara; Warland, Betsy; Munt, Sally (1994). "Inversions: Writings by Dykes, Queers and Lesbians by Betsy Warland; New Lesbian Criticism: Literary and Cultural Readings by Sally Munt". Feminist Review (46): 106–108. doi:10.2307/1395428. ISSN 0141-7789. JSTOR 1395428.
- Elliott, Bridget (1998). "Performing the Picture or Painting the Other: Romaine Brooks, Gluck and the Question of Decadence in 1923". In Deepwell, Katy (ed.). Women Artists and Modernism. Manchester and New York: Manchester University Press. ISBN 978-0-7190-5082-4.
- Faderman, Lillian (1981). Surpassing the Love of Men: Romantic Friendship and Love between Women from the Renaissance to the Present. New York: Quill. ISBN 978-0-688-00396-8.
- Fitzgerald, William (February 1978). "Radclyffe Hall's The Well of Loneliness: Sources and Inspiration". The Journal of Sex Research. 14 (1). Taylor & Francis: 50–53. doi:10.1080/00224497809550992. JSTOR 3812156.
- Flanner, Janet (1979). Paris was Yesterday: 1925–1939. New York: Penguin. ISBN 978-0-14-005068-4.
- Foster, Jeanette H. (1956). Sex Variant Women in Literature: A Historical and Quantitative Survey. New York: Vantage Press.
- Franks, Claudia Stillman (1982). "Stephen Gordon, Novelist: A Re-Evaluation of Radclyffe Hall's The Well of Loneliness". Tulsa Studies in Women's Literature. 1 (2): 125–139. doi:10.2307/464075. ISSN 0732-7730. JSTOR 464075.
- Gilmore, Leigh (1994). "Obscenity, Modernity, Identity: Legalizing The Well of Loneliness and Nightwood". Journal of the History of Sexuality. 4 (4). Austin, TX: University of Texas Press. ISSN 1043-4070. JSTOR 4617155.
- Green, Laura (2003). "Hall of Mirrors: Radclyffe Hall's The Well of Loneliness and Modernist Fictions of Identity" (PDF). Twentieth Century Literature. 49 (3): 277–297. doi:10.2307/3175982. hdl:2047/d20003276. ISSN 0041-462X. JSTOR 3175982.
- Hall, Radclyffe (1949). The Well of Loneliness. London: The Falcon Press. OCLC 4944993.
- Hall, Radclyffe (1981). The Well of Loneliness. New York: Avon. ISBN 978-0-380-54247-5.
- Hennegan, Alison (1982). Introduction to Radclyffe Hall's Well of Loneliness. London: Virago Modern Classics. ISBN 978-0-86068-254-7.
- Hopkins, Annis H. (1998). "Is She or Isn't She? Using Academic Controversy and The Well of Loneliness to Introduce the Social Construction of Lesbianism". Archived from the original on 10 September 2004.
- Kennedy, Hubert (2004). "Ulrichs, Karl Heinrich". glbtq: An Encyclopedia of Gay, Lesbian, Bisexual, Transgender, and Queer Culture. Archived from the original on 19 October 2006.
- Kennedy, Elizabeth Lapovsky; Davis, Madeline D. (1994). Boots of Leather, Slippers of Gold: The History of a Lesbian Community. New York: Penguin. ISBN 978-0-14-023550-0.
- Kitch, Tasmin (11 September 2003). "The Times Book Club and The Well of Loneliness". Times Online.
- Langer, Cassandra; Chadwick, Whitney; Lucchesi, Joe (Autumn 2001 – Winter 2002). "Review of Amazons in the Drawing Room: The Art of Romaine Brooks by Whitney Chadwick; Joe Lucchesi". Woman's Art Journal. 22 (2): 44–47. doi:10.2307/1358903. ISSN 0270-7993. JSTOR 1358903.
- Love, Heather (2000). "Hard Times and Heartaches: Radclyffe Hall's The Well of Loneliness". Journal of Lesbian Studies. 4 (2): 115–128. doi:10.1300/J155v04n02_08. ISSN 1089-4160. S2CID 147760713.
- Marshik, Celia (2003). "History's "Abrupt Revenges": Censoring War's Perversions in The Well of Loneliness and Sleeveless Errand". Journal of Modern Literature. 26 (2): 145–159. doi:10.1353/jml.2004.0019. ISSN 0022-281X. S2CID 162222203.
- Miller, Neil (1995). Out of the Past: Gay and Lesbian History from 1869 to the Present. New York City: Vintage Books. ISBN 0-09-957691-0.
- Newton, Esther (1984). "The Mythic Mannish Lesbian: Radclyffe Hall and the New Woman". Signs. 9 (4): 557–575. doi:10.1086/494087. JSTOR 3173611. S2CID 144754535.
- Nin, Anaïs (1986). Henry and June. New York: Harcourt, Inc. p. 133. ISBN 978-0-15-640057-2.
- O'Rourke, Rebecca (1989). Reflecting on The Well of Loneliness. London / New York: Routledge. ISBN 978-0-415-01841-8.
- Parkes, Adam (1994). "Lesbianism, History, and Censorship: The Well of Loneliness and the Suppressed Randiness of Virginia Woolf's Orlando". Twentieth Century Literature. 40 (4): 434–460. doi:10.2307/441599. ISSN 0041-462X. JSTOR 441599.
- Prosser, Jay (1998). Second Skins: The Body Narratives of Transsexuality. New York: Columbia University Press. ISBN 978-0-231-10934-5.
- Renault, Mary (1984). The Friendly Young Ladies. New York: Pantheon Books. ISBN 978-0-394-73369-2.
- Rodriguez, Suzanne (2002). Wild Heart: A Life: Natalie Clifford Barney and the Decadence of Literary Paris. New York: HarperCollins. ISBN 978-0-06-093780-5.
- Russo, Vito (1987). The Celluloid Closet: Homosexuality in the Movies. New York: Harper & Row. ISBN 978-0-06-096132-9.
- Schaff, Barbara (1998). "Radclyffe Hall's 'The Well of Loneliness' as an Early Example of Transsexual Autobiographical Writing". Third International Congress on Sex and Gender. Archived from the original on 11 March 2007.
- Souhami, Diana (1999). The Trials of Radclyffe Hall. New York: Doubleday. ISBN 978-0-385-48941-6.
- Stevens, Lillian L. (14 July 1990). "Texas Lesbians, in Particular; The Third Annual Texas Lesbian Conference Builds on the Past with a Promise for the Future". Gay Community News. p. 16.
- Stimpson, Catharine R. (Winter 1981). "Zero Degree Deviancy: The Lesbian Novel in English". Critical Inquiry. 8 (2): 363–379. doi:10.1086/448159. ISSN 0093-1896. S2CID 162249181.
- Taylor, Leslie A. (2001). "'I Made Up My Mind to Get It': The American Trial of The Well of Loneliness, New York City, 1928–1929". Journal of the History of Sexuality. 10 (2): 250–286. doi:10.1353/sex.2001.0042. ISSN 1043-4070. JSTOR 3704816. S2CID 142799942.
- Taylor, Melanie A. (1998). "'The Masculine Soul Heaving in the Female Bosom': Theories of inversion and The Well of Loneliness". Journal of Gender Studies. 7 (3): 287–296. doi:10.1080/09589236.1998.9960722. ISSN 0958-9236.
- Walker, Lisa (2001). Looking Like What You Are: Sexual Style, Race, and Lesbian Identity. New York: New York University Press. ISBN 978-0-8147-9372-5.
- Whitlock, Gillian (1987). "'Everything is Out of Place': Radclyffe Hall and the Lesbian Literary Tradition". Feminist Studies. 13 (3): 554–582. doi:10.2307/3177881. hdl:2027/spo.0499697.0013.306. ISSN 0046-3663. JSTOR 3177881.
