= Radclyffe Hall =

British poet and author (1880–1943)

John Radclyffe-Hall
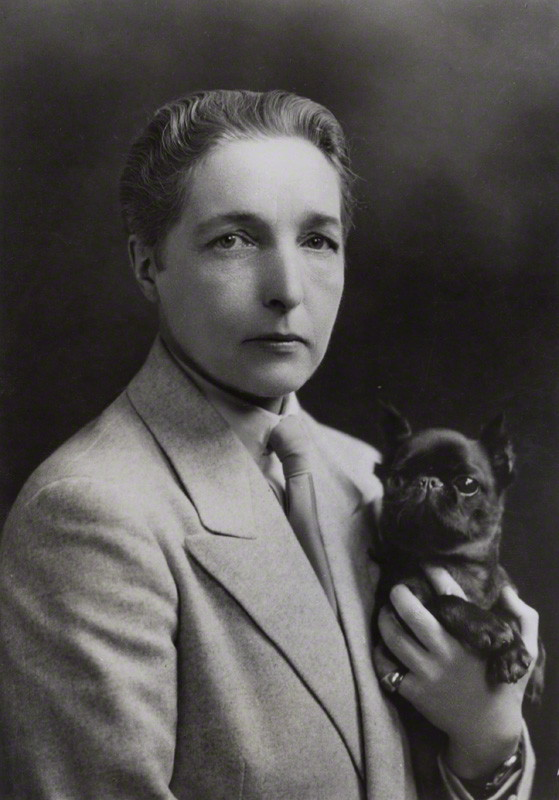
- Radclyffe Hall c. 1930
- Born: Marguerite Antonia Radclyffe Hall; 12 August 1880; Bournemouth, Hampshire, England
- Died: 7 October 1943 (aged 63); London, England
- Occupations: Novelist; poet; short story writer
- Partners: Mabel Batten; Una Troubridge
- Writing career
- Pen name: Radclyffe Hall
- Period: 1906–1936
- Notable work: The Well of Loneliness (1928)

Signature
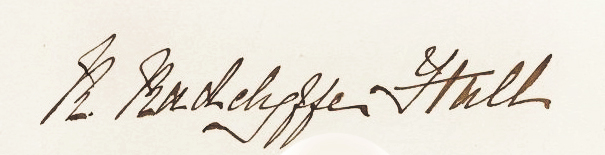

John Radclyffe-Hall (12 August 1880 – 7 October 1943), born as Marguerite Antonia Radclyffe-Hall and also known by her pen name Radclyffe Hall, was an English poet and author best known for her novel The Well of Loneliness (1928), a groundbreaking work in lesbian literature.

== Early life ==
John Radclyffe-Hall was born as Marguerite Antonia in 1880 at "Sunny Lawn", Durley Road, Bournemouth, Hampshire (now Dorset), to Radclyffe ("Rat") Radclyffe-Hall and Mary Jane Sager (née Diehl). Hall's father was a wealthy philanderer educated at Eton and Oxford. He seldom worked, as he had inherited a large sum of money from his father, an eminent physician who was head of the British Medical Association. Her mother was an unstable American widow from Philadelphia. In 1882, Hall's father abandoned the family, but left behind a considerable inheritance for her.

Hall's mother subsequently married Albert Visetti, a professor of singing. She did not like her new stepfather, and despised her mother, who often dipped into Hall's inheritance for herself. Throughout her childhood, Mary made it clear that Hall was unwanted, as she had failed to get an abortion during pregnancy.

As Hall grew older and gained more autonomy, she realised that she had enough inheritance money from her father to live without working or marrying. She began to do as she pleased, dressing in typical men's fashion of the times, such as trousers, monocles and hats. Hall was a lesbian, but described herself as a "congenital invert", a term taken from the writings of Havelock Ellis and other turn-of-the-century sexologists. She spent much of her twenties pursuing women she eventually lost to marriage.

A 27-year-old Hall met Mabel Batten (1856–1916), a well-known amateur singer of Lieder, in 1907 at the Bad Homburg spa in Germany. Batten, nicknamed "Ladye," was 51 years old, and was married with an adult daughter and grandchildren. They fell in love and set up residence together after Batten's husband died. Batten introduced Hall to a circle of artistic and intellectual women, many of them lesbians. She also was the first to call Hall "John", after noting her resemblance to one of Hall's male ancestors, and Hall used this name for the rest of her life. Batten encouraged Hall to begin seeking publishing for her poetry.

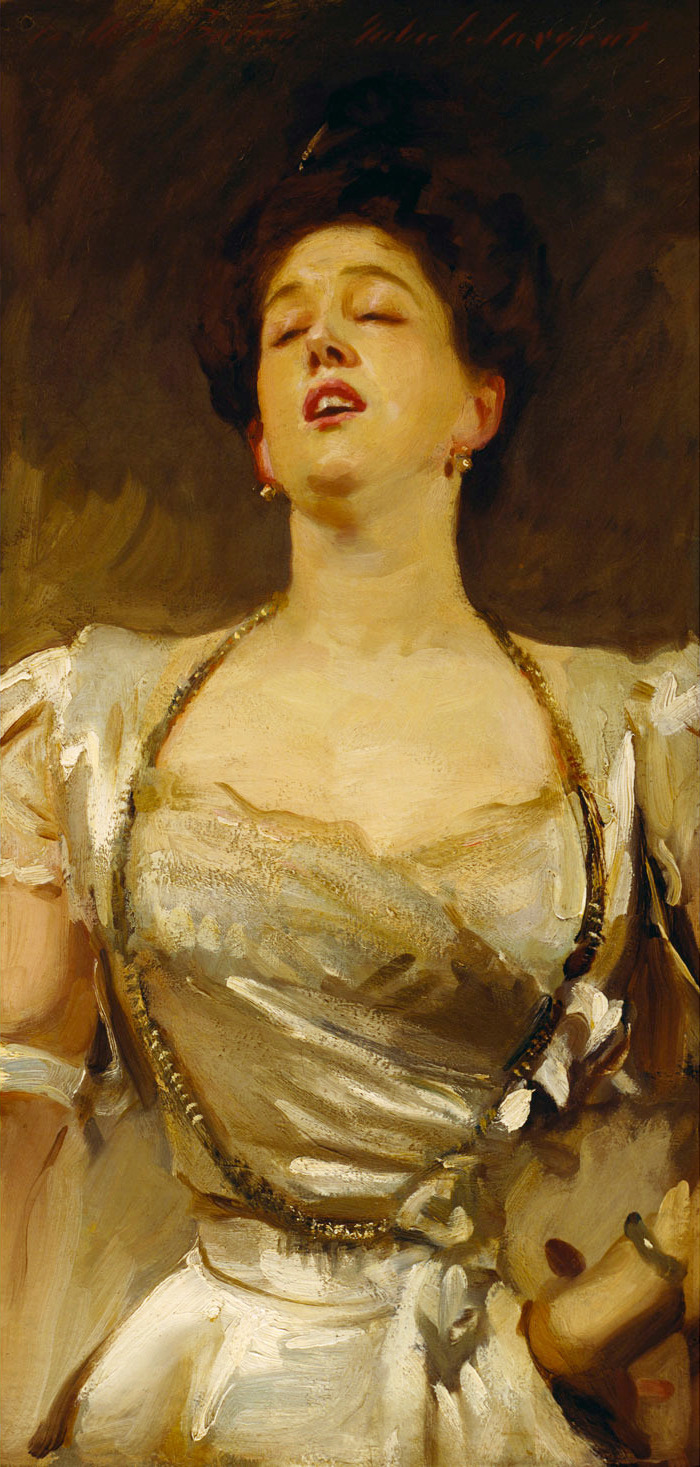
Mabel Batten sang to John Singer Sargent as he painted her portrait, around 1897.

In 1915, Hall fell in love with Batten's cousin, Una Troubridge (1887–1963). Troubridge was a sculptress, the wife of Vice-Admiral Ernest Troubridge, and the mother of a young daughter. Troubridge and Hall would be lovers for the remainder of their lives. The romance caused tension between Batten, Hall, and Troubridge until Batten died in 1916. Upon her death, Hall had Batten's corpse embalmed and a silver crucifix blessed by the pope laid on it. Hall, Batten, and Troubridge were "undeterred by the Church's admonitions on same-sex relationships. Hall's Catholicism sat beside a life-long attachment to spiritualism and reincarnation." In 1917, Radclyffe Hall and Una Troubridge began living together. From 1924 to 1929 they lived at 37 Holland Street, Kensington, London. The relationship lasted until Hall's death.

== Career ==
After a period of travel and education, Hall published five books of poetry between 1906 and 1915.

Hall's first novel was The Unlit Lamp, published in 1924 under the name Radclyffe Hall. It follows Joan Ogden, a young girl who dreams of setting up a flat in London with her friend Elizabeth in a Boston marriage. She is studying to become a doctor, but feels trapped by her manipulative mother's emotional dependence on her. Its length and grimness made it a difficult book to sell, so Hall deliberately chose a lighter theme for her next novel, a social comedy entitled The Forge (1924). While she had used her full name for her early poetry collections, she shortened it to M. Radclyffe Hall for The Forge. The book was a modest success, making the John O'London's Weekly bestseller list.

There followed another comic novel, A Saturday Life (1925), and then Adam's Breed (1926), a novel about an Italian headwaiter who, becoming disgusted with his job and even with the food itself, gives away his belongings and lives as a hermit in the forest. The book's mystical themes have been compared to Hermann Hesse's Siddhartha. It sold well, was critically acclaimed, and won both the Prix Femina and the James Tait Black Prize, a feat previously achieved only by E. M. Forster's A Passage to India. In 1926, she published her first short story dealing with homosexuality. Twelve days later, she began writing The Well of Loneliness.

=== The Well of Loneliness ===
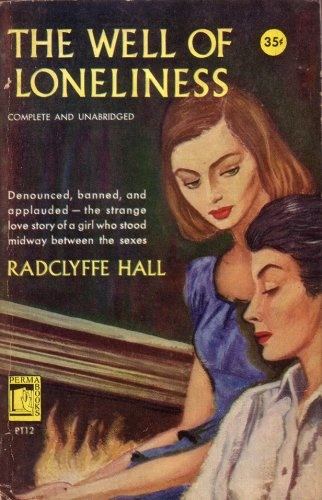
1951 cover of The Well of Loneliness

Hall's most well-known work is The Well of Loneliness, the only one of her eight novels to have overt lesbian themes. Published in 1928, The Well of Loneliness deals with the life of Stephen Gordon, a masculine lesbian who, like Hall herself, identifies as an "invert". The novel paints a vulnerable, sympathetic portrayal of lesbians.

Although The Well of Loneliness is not sexually explicit, it was nevertheless the subject of an obscenity trial in the UK, which resulted in an order for the destruction of all copies of the book. The United States allowed its publication only after a long court battle. The Well of Loneliness was number seven on a list of the top 100 lesbian and gay novels compiled by The Publishing Triangle in 1999. It is now noted as the predecessor to the golden age of lesbian pulp fiction.

=== Later novels ===
Hall published one novel after The Well of Loneliness. An anonymous verse lampoon titled The Sink of Solitude had appeared during the controversy over The Well. Although its primary targets were James Douglas, who had called for The Well's suppression, and the Home Secretary William Joynson-Hicks, who had started legal proceedings, it also mocked Hall and her book. One of the illustrations, which depicted Hall nailed to a cross, so horrified her that she could barely speak of it for years afterwards. Her sense of guilt at being depicted in a drawing that she saw as blasphemous led to her choice of a religious subject for her next novel The Master of the House.

At Hall's insistence, The Master of the House was published with no cover blurb, which may have misled some purchasers into thinking it was another novel about "inversion". Advance sales were strong, and the book made No. 1 on The Observer's bestseller list, but it received poor reviews in several key periodicals, and sales soon dropped off. In the United States reviewers treated the book more kindly, but shortly after the book's publication, all copies were seized by creditors, as Hall's American publisher had gone bankrupt. Houghton Mifflin took over the rights, but by the time the book could be republished, its sales momentum was lost.

== Later years and death ==
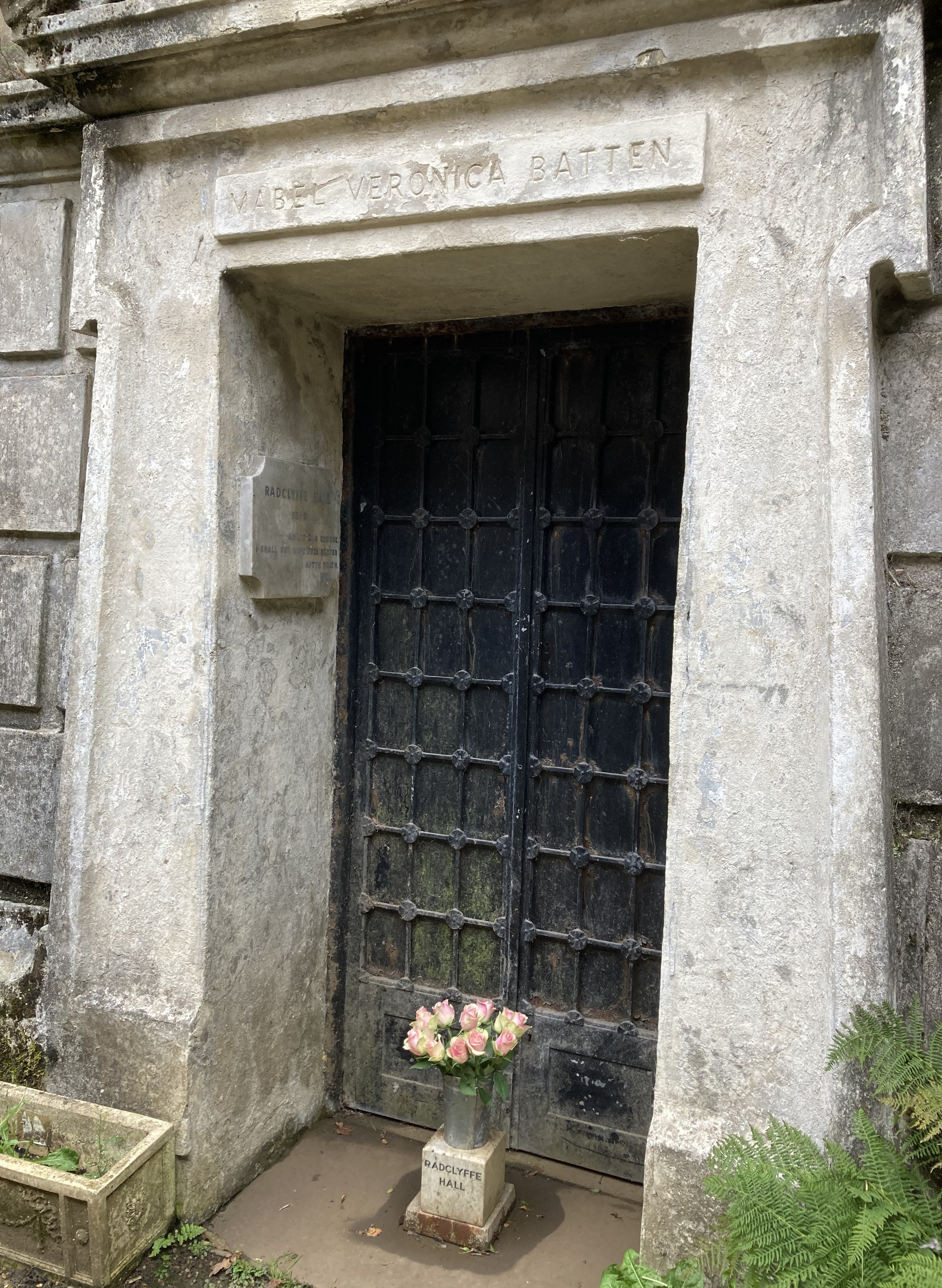
Vault of Mabel Batten and Radclyffe Hall in Highgate Cemetery

Hall lived with Una Troubridge in London and, during the 1930s, in the small town of Rye, East Sussex, noted for its many writers, including her contemporary the novelist E. F. Benson. Hall also was involved in affairs with other women throughout the years, including the actress Ethel Waters.

In 1930, Hall received the Gold Medal of the Eichelberger Humane Award. She was a member of the PEN club, the council of the Society for Psychical Research, and a fellow of the Zoological Society. In 1997 Hall was listed at No. 16 in the top 500 lesbian and gay heroes in The Pink Paper.

On holiday around 1934, Troubridge contracted enteritis. Evguenia Souline, a Russian nurse, was hired to care for her. Hall and Souline ended up having an affair, which Troubridge knew about and painfully tolerated. It unsettled Troubridge deeply, but she remained with Hall.

In 1943, Hall was diagnosed with cancer of the rectum. Operations were unsuccessful and she died at the age of 63. Her body is buried in a vault in the Circle of Lebanon on the western side of Highgate Cemetery at the entrance of the chamber of the Batten family, where Mabel is also buried.

== Works ==
=== Novels ===
- The Forge (1924)
- The Unlit Lamp (1924)
- A Saturday Life (1925)
- Adam's Breed (1926)
- The Well of Loneliness (1928)
- The Master of the House (1932)
- Miss Ogilvy Finds Herself (1934) - short stories
- The Sixth Beatitude (William Heineman Ltd, London, 1936)

=== Poetry ===
- Dedicated to Sir Arthur Sullivan (England: s.n., 1894)
- Twixt Earth and Stars (London: John and Edward Bumpus Ltd., 1906)
- A Sheaf of Verses : Poems (London: J. and E. Bumpus, 1908)
- Poems of the Past & Present (London: Chapman And Hall, 1910)
- Songs of Three Counties and Other Poems (London: Chapman & Hall, 1913)
- The Forgotten Island (London: Chapman & Hall, 1915)
- Rhymes and Rhythms (Milan, 1948)

== Archives ==
Many of Hall and Troubridge's surviving papers are held at the Harry Ransom Center, University of Texas, including a manuscript of The Well of Loneliness, notebooks, diaries, and correspondence. Typescript copies of Hall's love letters to Evguenia Souline, written during the late 1930s and early 1940s, are held at the Cadbury Research Library, University of Birmingham.

== Works featuring Hall ==
- Virginia's Sisters: An Anthology of Women's Writing, Aurora Metro Books, 2023, ISBN 9781912430789
