= Wake (surname) =

Wake is a surname. Notable people with the surname include:

- Brian Wake (born 1982), English footballer
- Blanche of Lancaster, Baroness Wake of Liddell (c. 1305 – c. 1380), English noblewoman
- Brian Wake (born 1982), English footballer
- Bronwyn Wake, Australian scientist
- Cameron Wake (born 1982), American football player
- Cameron Wake (cricketer) (born 1985), English cricketer
- Sir Charles Wake, 10th Baronet (1791–1864), British landowner
- Clive Wake, South African-born editor and translator
- David B. Wake (1936–2021), American herpetologist
- Egerton Wake (1871–1929), British political organiser
- Harry Wake (1901–1981), English footballer
- Hereward Wake, multiple people, including:
  - Hereward the Wake (c. 1035 – c. 1072), Anglo-Saxon nobleman
  - Sir Hereward Wake, 13th Baronet (1876–1963), British Army officer
  - Sir Hereward Wake, 14th Baronet (1916–2017), British Army officer
- Isaac Wake (1580–1632), English diplomat and political commentator
- Jehanne Wake, British historian
- Jenny Wake, New Zealand actor and theatre director
- Joan Wake (1884–1974), British historian
- John Wake (disambiguation), multiple people, including:
  - John Wake (born 1953), English cricketer
  - John Wake, 1st Baron Wake of Liddell (c. 1268 – 1300), English nobleman and soldier
  - John Wake (MP) (fl. 1388), English political figure
  - John Cheltenham Wake (1834–1882), English painter
- Margaret Wake, multiple people, including:
  - Margaret Wake, 3rd Baroness Wake of Liddell (c. 1297 – 1349), English noblewoman
  - Margaret Wake Tryon (c. 1732 – 1819), English heiress
- Marvalee Wake (born 1939), American zoologist
- Melissa Wake, New Zealand paediatric researcher
- Nancy Wake (1912–2011), New Zealand-born Australian-British spy
- Neil V. Wake (1948–2026), American judge
- Ric Wake, English-American record producer
- Robert A. Wake, American spelling bee champion
- Roger le Wake (fl. 1298), English political figure
- Shingo Wake (born 1987), Japanese boxer
- Thomas Wake, multiple people, including:
  - Thomas Wake, 2nd Baron Wake of Liddell (1297–1349), English nobleman
  - Thomas Wake (pirate) (died 1697), American pirate
- William Wake (disambiguation), several people, including:
  - William Wake (1657–1737), English minister and Archbishop of Canterbury
  - Sir William Wake, 8th Baronet (1742–1785), British politician
  - William Wake (cricketer) (1852–1896), English cricketer
  - William Wake (governor) (died 1750), English colonial administrator

== Te Wake ==
Notable people with the New Zealand Māori surname Te Wake include:

- Heremia Te Wake (c. 1838 – 1918), New Zealand tribal leader and catechist
- Dame Hohewhina Te Wake (1895–1994), New Zealand political activist
- Ramon Te Wake (born 1976), New Zealand musician and television presenter
- Jay Tewake (born 1990), New Zealand actor

== Compound surname ==
These people have Wake as part of a compound surname:

- Cathrine Burnett-Wake, Australian politician
- Sir Baldwin Wake Walker (1802–1876), British naval officer
- Sir Frederic Wake-Walker (1888–1945), British naval officer

== Fictional characters ==
- Alan Wake, from the eponymous video game series
- Chief Inspector Wake, from the Charles Kingston O'Mahony series
- Dr. Wake, from Dr. Wake's Patient
- Kingi Te Wake, from Shortland Street

== See also ==
- Baron Wake of Liddell
- Wake baronets
