= Hereward Wake =

Hereward Wake could refer to:

- Hereward the Wake (born 1035), 11th-century Anglo-Saxon leader
- A number of the Wake baronets:

- Sir Hereward Wake, 12th Baronet (1852–1916)
- Sir Hereward Wake, 13th Baronet (1876-1963), British Army general
- Sir Hereward Wake, 14th Baronet (1916–2017), British Army officer and countryman
- Sir Hereward Charles Wake, 15th Baronet (born 1952)
