= John Wake (disambiguation) =

John Wake was a cricketer.

John Wake may also refer to:

- John Cheltenham Wake, artist
- John Wake (MP) for Melcombe Regis
