= William Wake (disambiguation) =

William Wake (1657–1737) was an English priest and the archbishop of Canterbury 1716 until his death in 1737.

William Wake may also refer to:

- Sir William Wake, 8th Baronet (1742–1785), British politician
- William Wake (cricketer) (1852–1896), English cricketer
- William Wake (governor), governor of Bombay, 1742–1750
- William Wake (sailor), captain of the British trading schooner, Prince William Henry, Wake Island is named after him
