= Sir Robert Bernard, 5th Baronet =

Sir Robert Bernard, 5th Baronet (1740–1789) was an English politician, Member of Parliament for Huntingdonshire and Westminster.

== Life ==
He was the eldest and only surviving son of Sir John Bernard, 4th Baronet and his wife Mary St. John, daughter of Sir Francis St John, 1st Baronet of Longthorpe; of their nine children, only Robert and his elder sister Mary lived to adulthood. The baronetcy was founded by Sir Robert Bernard, 1st Baronet (1601–1666), a serjeant-at-law and MP for Huntingdon, created baronet in 1662; Samuel Pepys consulted him in 1661 over the contested Brampton estate inheritance. He was educated at Westminster School, and matriculated at Christ Church, Oxford in 1758.

== Member of Parliament ==
Bernard came into the House of Commons in 1765 for Huntingdonshire uncontested under a local electoral deal, after Lord Charles Montagu gave up his seat there to take an American colonial post. In parliament he was a Rockingham Whig. On the death of his father in 1766, Bernard succeeded as 5th Baronet. In April 1767, Bernard joined fellow Wilkite associates James Townsend and John Dunning in petitioning for a grant of 20,000 acres each in East Florida, suggesting involvement in colonial land speculation alongside his political allies.

The electoral pact unravelled shortly in the two-seat constituency of Huntingdonshire. Bernard fell out with his patron George Montagu, 4th Duke of Manchester, and John Montagu, 4th Earl of Sandwich announced he would now back two candidates. Nevertheless, Bernard put himself forward as a candidate in the 1768 general election. He obtained 666 votes, finishing third behind John Montagu, Viscount Hinchingbrooke and Peter Ludlow, Earl Ludlow, and was 138 votes behind his nearest opponent.

In the sequel Bernard's politics shifted in a more radical reformist direction, and he became closely associated with John Wilkes and other Wilkite reformers. Sandwich took the view that he had come under the influence of Lord Shelburne. Moving to London, he became a Wilkite, and was a founder of the Society of Gentlemen Supporters of the Bill of Rights. When a vacancy occurred in the House of Commons during 1770 for Westminster, Edwin Sandys having moved to the House of Lords, Bernard was unanimously nominated at Westminster Hall on 24 April 1770, the first candidate returned against the government there since 1741; he had previously served as MP for Huntingdonshire (1765–1768). He was then elected unopposed with the backing of William Dowdeswell, Rockinghamite leader in the Commons. While serving as a Member of Parliament, his only recorded speech was on 11 March 1773, on a bill to restrain stockjobbing. In 1771, he broke with Wilkes, voting to dissolve the Bill of Rights Society and joining the rival Constitutional Society. He was no longer supported by Westminster radicals in 1774.

== Reformer at large ==
At the 1774 general election, Bernard lost his Huntingdonshire seat to Lord Thomas Pelham Clinton. It followed a schism in the Wilkites, in which John Horne and John Sawbridge with Bernard left the Bill of Rights Society to found their own Constitutional Society. Lord North brought in both the 2nd Duke of Newcastle, father of Lord Thomas, and the 5th Duke of Bedford, to reclaim the Westminster seat for the government. In the meantime, however, Bernard took advantage of resentment in the Bedford borough at high-handed behaviour of the 4th Duke of Bedford. In 1769, over 500 honorary burgesses were created in a day, and 611 in that year, in Bernard’s interest to increase his influence over the borough’s parliamentary elections. The role of honorary freemen in Bedford elections was later contested, with petitions challenging the voting rights of non-resident freemen. He was elected recorder there in 1771, after the 4th Duke's death, the group of honorary freemen of the borough having been stacked with his supporters, including Horne, Sawbridge and James Townsend. He remained Recorder of Bedford until his death in 1789.

In the 1774 election, and for the rest of his life, Bernard had a significant interest in Bedford borough, and its two seats in parliament; John Horne acted as his electoral agent. That year they brought in Sir William Wake, 8th Baronet and Robert Sparrow, married to Bernard's sister Mary, ahead of Samuel Whitbread and John Howard. Close scrutiny of the votes later resulted in Sparrow being replaced in March 1775 by Whitbread.

The Huntingdonshire moderate reformist group of Bernard, Lord Carysfort and John Jebb had national connections to Christopher Wyvill's Yorkshire Association, opposed to the American Revolutionary War, from 1780, though with reservations on policy; and later to Major John Cartwright. The Yorkshire Association sought economical reform and reductions in Crown patronage and spending, before broadening into a wider campaign for parliamentary reform including shorter parliaments and increased county representation, drawing its support primarily from gentry and clergy. Wake was re-elected for Bedford in 1780, but stood down for the 1784 general election. John Horne, by then going by John Horne Tooke, ensured that the planter William MacDowall Colhoun stood for the Bernard interest, a contentious choice, at a difficult London meeting held in the Globe Tavern, Fleet Street. His active political career was curtailed in the 1780s by increasingly severe attacks of gout.

== Death and legacy ==
Through his parents Bernard inherited estates not only in Huntingdonshire and Northamptonshire but also in Essex, although the Essex properties lacked a substantial family house, and he was regarded as a wealthy landowner. Suffering in the 1780s from gout, Sir Robert Bernard died on 2 January 1789, unmarried, at Brampton Park. He left his property to his nephew Robert Bernard Sparrow, son of Robert Sparrow and his sister Mary. Huntingdonshire Archives preserves a 1789 catalogue of books at Thorp Hall and Brampton Park made at the time of his death. According to National Gallery provenance research, Bernard also owned The Mass of Saint Giles, and pictures from his collection were sold at Christie’s in London on 9 May 1789.
