= Margaret Wake =

Margaret Wake may refer to:

- Margaret Wake, 3rd Baroness Wake of Liddell (c. 1297 – 1349), English noblewoman of the 14th century
- Margaret Wake, wife of William Tryon, after whom Wake County, North Carolina, is named
