= Sir Hereward Wake, 13th Baronet =

British Army officer

Major-General Sir Hereward Wake Bt CB CMG DSO
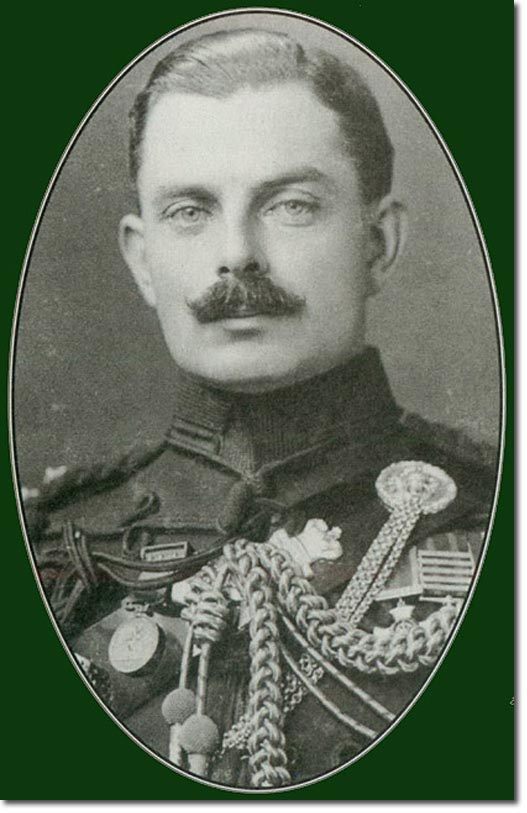
- Wake as a young captain of the King's Royal Rifle Corps, between 1902 and 1914
- Born: 11 February 1876; London, England
- Died: 4 August 1963 (aged 87)
- Military career
- Allegiance: United Kingdom
- Branch: British Army
- Service years: 1897–1937
- Rank: Major-General
- Unit: King's Royal Rifle Corps
- Commands: 46th (North Midland) Division (1934–1937); 12th Infantry Brigade (1929–1932); 4th battalion, King's Royal Rifle Corps (1920–1923)
- Conflicts: Second Boer War; First World War
- Awards: Companion of the Order of the Bath; Companion of the Order of St Michael and St George; Distinguished Service Order; Mentioned in Despatches; Commander of the Legion of Honour (France); Commander of the Order of the Crown of Italy

Major-General Sir Hereward Wake, 13th Baronet, CB, CMG, DSO (11 February 1876 – 4 August 1963) was a British Army officer. Born into an historic and noble family, he joined the King's Royal Rifle Corps (KRRC) as a second lieutenant in 1897. He served on the staff during the Second Boer War, and was awarded the Distinguished Service Order. During the First World War, he served again as a staff officer with the British Expeditionary Force. In 1917 he was promoted to the temporary rank of brigadier-general and appointed to the secretariat of the Supreme War Council (SWC). Wake led E Branch, responsible for advising the British military representative, General Sir Henry Wilson on enemy strength and supply. Wake's unit predicted the 1918 German spring offensive but countermeasures recommended by the SWC were ignored by the British commander-in-chief Field Marshal Sir Douglas Haig. Towards the end of the war Wake predicted that Germany would remain the predominant military power in Europe.

After the war, Wake returned to his regiment and commanded its 4th battalion in British India. He was made an aide-de-camp to George V and promoted to major-general. Wake afterwards commanded the 12th Infantry Brigade and the 46th (North Midland) Division.

Wake retired from the army in 1937 but maintained links, being appointed to the honorary role of colonel-commandant of the KRRC, and later chairing the Northamptonshire Territorial Army Association. During the Second World War, he commanded the county's Local Defence Volunteers, and was colonel-commandant of the 1st battalion of the Northamptonshire Army Cadet Force. He also held non-military roles as a Deputy Lieutenant and High Sheriff of Northamptonshire. He had an interest in history, was a member of the Northamptonshire Record Society and campaigned for the restoration of abandoned ironstone quarries in the county.

== Early life ==
Hereward Wake was born in London on 11 February 1876, the eldest son of Sir Hereward Wake, 12th Baronet. The Wake family, owners of the manor of Courteenhall since 1672, claim descent from the Anglo-Saxon noble, Hereward the Wake, who led an armed opposition in East Anglia to the 1066 Norman conquest. This may have been an attempt to improve the family's English provenance in the 14th century, and it seems more likely the Wakes were descended from a 12th-century Norman immigrant. Hereward Wake was educated at Eton College.

== Military career ==
=== Boer War ===
Wake attended the Royal Military College, Sandhurst from 1896, and after graduating, he was appointed a second lieutenant in the King's Royal Rifle Corps (KRRC) on 17 March 1897. Promoted to lieutenant on 8 February 1899, he saw active service in South Africa during the Second Boer War from November 1899. He was seconded to the staff on 13 March 1900, and served as aide-de-camp to the Commander-in-Chief of British Forces in South Africa (initially Frederick Roberts, 1st Earl Roberts, later Herbert Kitchener, 1st Earl Kitchener) from 18 March 1900 to 1 March 1901. Wake saw action at the Battle of Colenso (15 December 1899), Battle of Spion Kop (23–24 January 1900), Battle of the Tugela Heights (14–27 February 1900) and the Relief of Ladysmith (1 March 1900). He was wounded in action during the war and was also twice mentioned in dispatches (on 3 February and 9 March 1900). Wake was awarded the Distinguished Service Order (DSO) on 29 November 1900 and, during this war, also received the Royal Humane Society's bronze medal for the saving of life. Also serving on Roberts' staff in South Africa was Major Henry Wilson, with whom Wake would be associated in his later career.

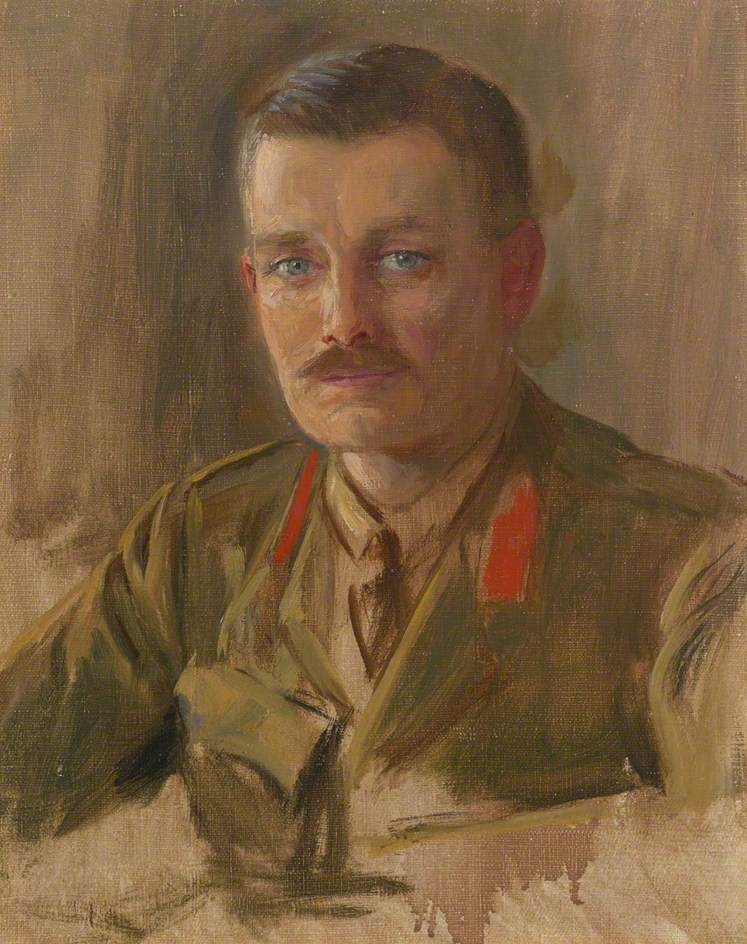
Wake at the Supreme War Council, 3 July 1918, by Herbert Arnould Olivier

Later in the war Wake was promoted to captain on 7 January 1902, and commanded a company on operations in the Orange Free State, the Colony of Natal, the South African Republic and Cape Colony. Wake returned to his regiment on 6 December 1902, and was appointed adjutant of the 4th battalion on 27 June 1903, while the battalion was posted in Harrismith. He returned to England on 28 June 1904 and relinquished his appointment as adjutant on 26 June 1906. In 1908 he attended the Staff College, Camberley where Wilson was commandant. He was advanced to the regimental rank of captain on 22 December 1908 and at the same time joined the Naval War Course for training. In 1910 Wake was appointed a 3rd grade general staff officer and he worked at the War Office until 1911.

=== First World War ===
By 1914 Wake held the rank of major and, after the outbreak of the First World War, held a position as a War Office liaison officer with The Admiralty. Later that year he was appointed as a 3rd grade general staff officer to the general headquarters of the British Expeditionary Force. Whilst in France Wake, with Wilson, attended the death bed of Roberts, who had fallen ill while visiting the troops. In November he wrote an article for the journal of the Royal United Services Institute entitled The Four-Company Battalion in Battle.

Wake transferred to the staff of I Corps in 1915 and became a 2nd grade general staff officer on 1 February 1916, returning to the War Office. Wake was appointed 1st grade staff officer on 1 March 1916 on the staff of the 61st (2nd South Midland) Division and also received the temporary rank of lieutenant colonel. Wake, who in January 1917 was promoted to brevet lieutenant colonel, was promoted to the temporary rank of brigadier general in December 1917. Wilson was then the British military representative on the Allied Supreme War Council (SWC), based at Versailles, and selected Wake to join the organisation's secretariat in December. Wake headed the British E Branch, responsible for estimating the state of enemy manpower and materiel, the first time that such an in-depth study was attempted by the British. In this role he noted the difficulties the Allies had in estimating the strength of Austro-Hungarian forces on the Italian front. Wake's men were encouraged to think like their opponents and Wilson had them wear their caps back to front to remind them of this.

Wake's unit predicted the German spring offensive by January of that year, presenting his findings to Leo Amery, who was the political representative to the SWC, and British prime minister David Lloyd George. He estimated that 100 German divisions would push back the British right flank and separate them from their French allies. Wake's findings and the recommendations of the SWC's A Branch for British countermeasures were ignored by the British commander in chief, Field Marshal Sir Douglas Haig.

When the German offensive came, and almost succeeded, Wake complained to Amery about the state of British military leadership. Amery noted in his diary that Wake and another SWC officer thought that there was "no one at GHQ [Haig's General Head Quarters] who has any brains or approves of brains in anyone else". Wake had asked Amery "what was to be expected with a fool like Haig and a liar like Petain [the French commander in chief]". Later in 1918 he made a number of tours of inspection of the Balkans on behalf of the British government. Towards the end of the war Wake was asked his assessment of the future balance of power in Europe. On 26 October he stated that Germany would remain the strongest military power for the foreseeable future. He cautioned against any attempt to create buffer states on Germany's eastern border, predicting that these would merely become German satellites.

For his service during the war, Wake received the French Legion of Honour and the Order of the Crown of Italy in 1919. In addition, he was made a Companion of the Order of St Michael and St George, with the brevet rank of lieutenant colonel. After the war he maintained a link with army veterans, from 1922 he was the first president of the Roade and Courteenhall Branch of the Royal British Legion and presented them with a wooden hut to host their meetings.

=== Later career ===
Wake commanded the 4th Battalion, KRRC in British India from 1920 to 1923, was promoted on 11 August 1924 to colonel, with seniority backdated to 1 January 1921, and appointed an aide-de-camp to King George V on 5 December 1930, then promoted to major-general on 23 May 1932. He commanded the 12th Infantry Brigade until placed on half pay on 23 August 1932. He returned to service on 1 April 1934 as commander of the Territorial Army's 46th (North Midland) Division, by this time he had also been appointed a Companion of the Order of the Bath. Retiring from the army on 11 February 1937, on 20 January 1938, he became colonel-commandant of the KRRC, an honorary and ceremonial role.

During the Second World War, Wake chaired the Northamptonshire Territorial Army Association and commanded the Northamptonshire Local Defence Volunteers. He was general officer commanding of the Northern Home Guard from 1940 to 1943. On 5 May 1942, Wake was appointed the first colonel-commandant of 1st battalion, Northamptonshire Army Cadet Force (this unit is now A Company of the Leicestershire, Northamptonshire and Rutland Army Cadet Force). Wake co-authored Swift and Bold, a history of the KRRC in the Second World War, published in 1949.

== Personal life and other interests ==
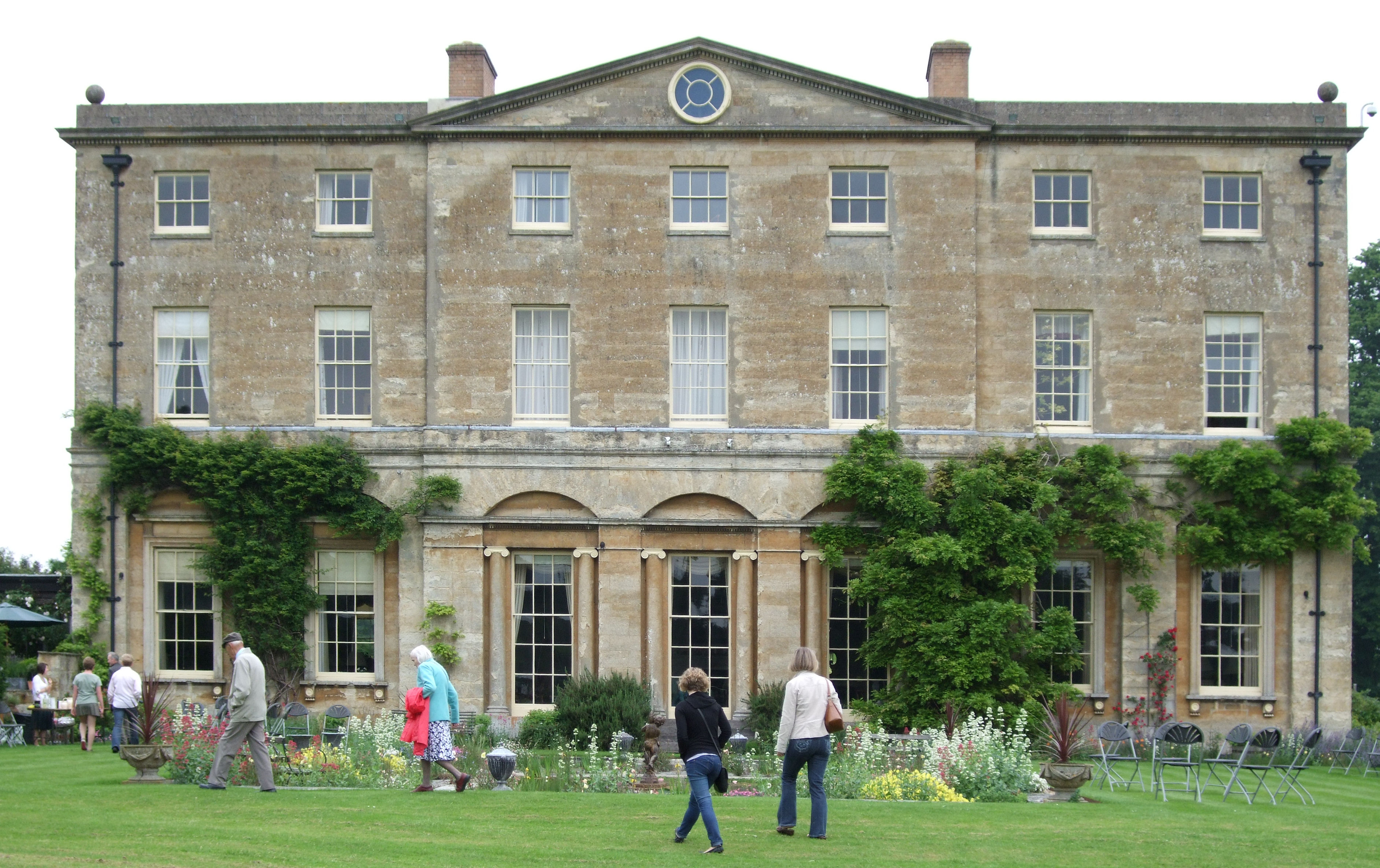
Courteenhall House

Wake married Margaret Winifred Benson, the daughter of banker and art collector Robin Benson, at St George's Hanover Square Church, Westminster, on 30 October 1912. The Wakes lived at their ancestral home, Courteenhall House. They had seven children, including Hereward Wake who also served in the KRRC. One of their daughters, Diana Wake, was killed in a riding accident at Bicester Hunt Races on 11 March 1950, another married the son of Major-General Guy Dawnay.

Wake inherited the baronetcy (as 13th baronet) upon his father's death in 1916. He was appointed as a deputy lieutenant for Northamptonshire on 29 July 1922. Wake was nominated for the position of High Sheriff of Northamptonshire in November 1925 and 1938, before he was appointed to the position in 1944.

Wake had a keen interest in history and was an early member of the Northamptonshire Record Society, founded by his sister Joan Wake in 1920. During the inter-war years, he had at one time held command of Dover Castle and was responsible for handing over its keep to the Office of Works for preservation, having recognised its historic importance and the risk of fire posed by its use as a rifle store.

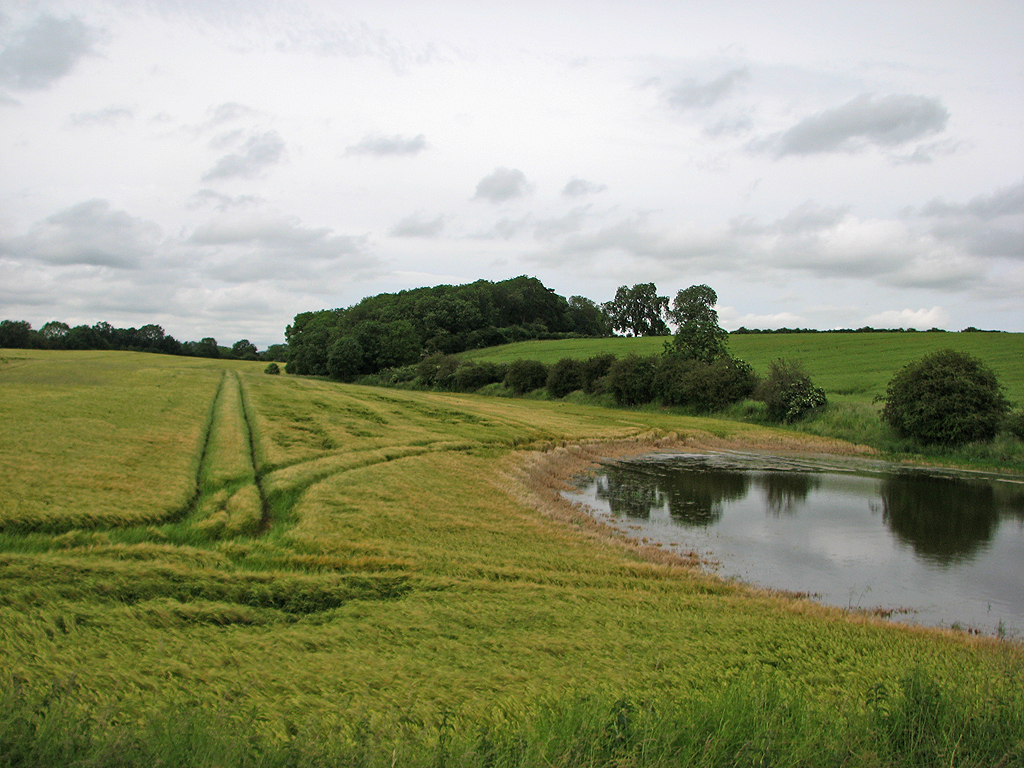
Site of a former ironstone quarry, Slipton, Northamptonshire

Wake also played a key role in highlighting the damage caused to Northamptonshire by ironstone workings. He chaired a sub-committee on the issue for the county's branch of the Country Landowners Association and was a member of the Northamptonshire County Planning Committee. Wake opposed the findings of the Kennet Committee which recommended against any action to restore the workings. He played a role in persuading government to pass the Mineral Workings Act 1951, proposed by Labour Party Member of Parliament Hugh Dalton, to mandate the restoration of all current ironstone workings and several thousand acres of former workings. In later life he lived in Hampshire but continued to monitor the progress of restoration on visits to Northamptonshire. Wake died on 4 August 1963.

== Bibliography ==
- Baker, Chris (12 July 2011). The Battle for Flanders: German Defeat on the Lys 1918. Casemate Publishers. ISBN 978-1-84468-592-9.
- Churchill, Randolph Spencer (1971). Winston S. Churchill. Companion Volume: pt. 2. May 1915-Dec. 1916. Houghton Mifflin. ISBN 978-0-395-13153-4.
- Derby, Edward George Villiers Stanley Earl of (2001). Paris 1918: The War Diary of the British Ambassador, the 17th Earl of Derby. Liverpool University Press. ISBN 978-0-85323-657-3.
- Gilbert, Martin (2015). Winston S. Churchill: The Challenge of War, 1914–1916. Rosetta Books. ISBN 978-0-7953-4451-0.
- Jaffe, Lorna S. (8 January 2020). The Decision to Disarm Germany: British Policy Towards Postwar German Disarmament, 1914-1919. Routledge. ISBN 978-1-000-69061-3.
- McCrae, Meighen (24 January 2019). Coalition Strategy and the End of the First World War: The Supreme War Council and War Planning, 1917–1918. Cambridge University Press. ISBN 978-1-108-47530-3.
- Lord Raglan (2013). The Hero: A Study in Tradition, Myth and Drama. Courier Corporation. ISBN 978-0-486-31714-4.
- Robbins, Simon Nicholas (2001), British Generalship on the Western Frontin the First World War, 1914 - 1918 (PDF) (PhD thesis), King's College, University of London
- Reid, Walter (2 November 2017). Five Days from Defeat: March 1918: How Britain Nearly Lost the First World War. Birlinn. ISBN 978-0-85790-941-1.
- Roberts, Earl Frederick Sleigh (2000). Lord Roberts and the War in South Africa, 1899-1902. Sutton Publishing for the Army Records Society. ISBN 978-0-7509-2555-6.
- Robinson, Peter (1 January 2013). The Letters of Major General Price Davies VC, CB, CMG, DSO: From Captain to Major General, 1914-18. History Press. p. 55. ISBN 978-0-7524-9223-0.
- Sheffield, Gary (11 March 2014). Command and Morale: The British Army on the Western Front 1914–1918. Pen and Sword. ISBN 978-1-4738-3466-8.
- Spencer, John (January 2018), Soldier-diplomat: a Reassesment of Sir Henry Wilson's Influence on British Strategy in the Last 18 Months of the Great War (PDF) (PhD thesis), University of Wolverhampton

Military offices
Preceded by Maurice Taylor	GOC 46th (North Midland) Division; 1934–1937	Post disbanded
Baronetage of England
Preceded by Hereward Wake	Baronet (of Clevedon); 1916–1963	Succeeded by Hereward Wake
