= Geekie =

Geekie is a surname. Notable people with the surname include:

- Conor Geekie (born 2004), Canadian ice hockey player
- John Geekie (fl. 1740s), British governor of Bombay in 1742
- Morgan Geekie (born 1998), Canadian ice hockey player
