= Maurice Taylor (disambiguation) =

Maurice Taylor could refer to:

- Maurice Taylor (born 1976), American basketball player
- Maurice Taylor (British Army officer) (1881–1960), British Army officer
- Maurice Taylor (bishop) (1926–2023), Scottish Roman Catholic bishop
- Morry Taylor (Maurice Taylor Jr., born 1944), American businessman and former presidential candidate
