= Richard Vernon (MP) =

British horse breeder and trainer and politician

Richard Vernon (18 June 1726 – 16 September 1800) was a British horse breeder and trainer and a politician who sat in the House of Commons between 1754 and 1790.

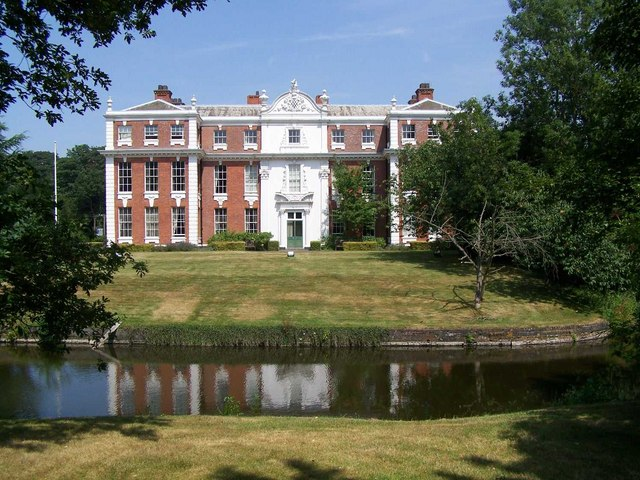
Hilton Park, Staffordshire - seat of the Vernon family

== Early life ==
Vernon was born on 18 June 1726, the eldest son of Henry Vernon MP of Hilton Park, Staffordshire. He undertook a Grand Tour through Italy and France in about 1743.

He joined the army and was an ensign in the 1st Foot Guards in November 1744. In 1747, he was lieutenant and captain. By 1751 he was closely associated with the Duke of Bedford.

Vernon was one of the original members of the Jockey Club. As early as 4 June 1751 the betting-book at the old White's Club records a wager between Lord March and Captain Richard Vernon, alias Fox alias Jubilee Dicky. Vernon was blackballed at the club in the following year because of his friendship with the Duke of Bedford. Horace Walpole described him as ‘a very inoffensive, good-humoured young fellow, who lives in the strongest intimacy with all the fashionable young men’ Sometime after this he moved to Newmarket, where he entered into a racing partnership with Lord March, commonly known as ‘Old Q.’ Thomas Holcroft the dramatist, worked as a stable boy in his stables for two and a half years, and called Vernon ‘a gentleman of acute notoriety on the turf’.

== Political career ==
Vernon's political career was controlled by the Duke of Bedford and his record is a story of profitable positions and dumb votes. At the general election of 1754, Vernon was unsuccessful on the Bedford interest at Camelford, but was returned in a by-election on 10 December 1754 as Member of Parliament for Tavistock. The Duke of Bedford was lord lieutenant of Ireland and in 1757 Vernon became his second secretary.

He married Evelyn, Countess of Upper Ossory, the widow of John Fitzpatrick, 1st Earl of Upper Ossory and daughter of John Leveson-Gower, 1st Earl Gower on 15 February 1759. Soon after in May was given an Irish sinecure Clerk of quit rents in Ireland. He was subsequently given a pension of £500 p.a. in lieu of income of that office. Vernon was returned after a contest on the Duke's interest at Bedford in the 1761 general election. He became clerk of the Green Cloth in April 1764 but lost the post in July 1765. Much was dependent on the Duke's own fortunes and he was reinstated in 1768. He was re-elected at Bedford after another contest in 1768. However, in 1771 the town enfranchised a large number of freemen which outnumbered the Duke's interest and in 1774 Vernon was moved to the safer Bedford family seat at Okehampton. He became clerk of the Green Cloth again in 1779 and held the post until March 1782 after he was returned at the 1780 general election.

The English Chronicle wrote of Vernon in 1781:

He is ... not distinguished either for splendour or deficiency of talents, but with a perfect mediocrity of intellectual endowments enjoys his place, breeds his horses, contrives matches, which he is said to do with more skill and success than any man on the turf, and gives a silent vote to the minister.

In 1784, he moved to a seat in the Gower interest at Newcastle-under-Lyme. He was not given any further office and retired at the 1790 general election.

== Horse Racing ==
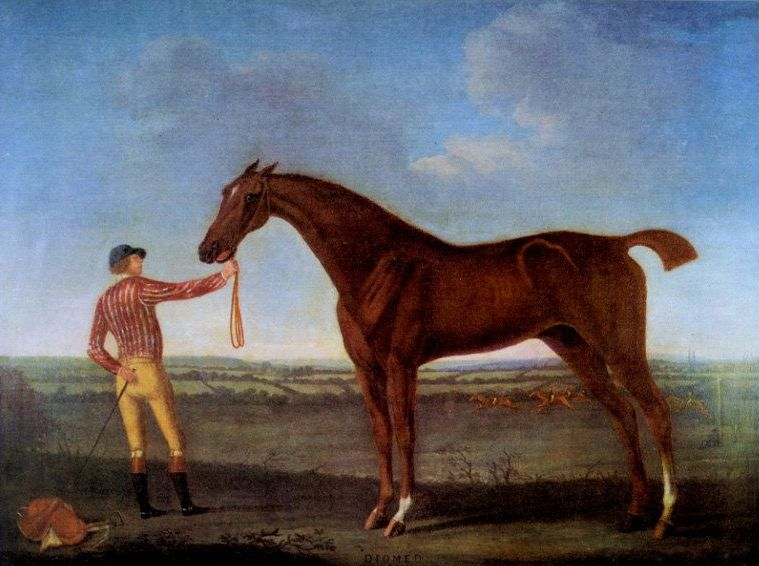
Diomed "the Marvel"

Vernon bred and owned a large number of horses. He also trained and raced them, and was one of those who began the running of yearlings at Newmarket. In 1753 he won one of the two Jockey Club Plates, and in 1768 carried off the first Jockey Club Challenge Cup with his Marquis, son of the Godolphin Arabian. At the first Craven meeting, held in 1771, he won the stakes with Pantaloon against a field of thirteen; and his three-year-old Fame by that sire ran second for the first Oaks on 14 May 1779. Diomed, winner of the first Derby came from his stables. In 1787 he won the Oaks with Annette (by Eclipse). He owned Emigrant, winner of the July Stakes in 1796. He rode himself and took part in a gentleman-jockey race at Newmarket in 1758. The Jockey Club were his tenants at the old coffee-room at Newmarket. The ground lease was purchased by him in 1771, and bought by the stewards on its expiration sixty years later

== Later life ==
By betting and breeding horses Vernon is stated to have converted ‘a slender patrimony of three thousand pounds into a fortune of a hundred thousand’ before quitting the turf as an owner. Vernon's name is also noted in the annals of horticulture as the introducer of fruit-forcing. His peaches at Newmarket were famous.

Vernon died on 16 September 1800. His daughter Henrietta married George Greville, 2nd Earl of Warwick at the home of her Uncle the Earl of Gower in Whitehall on 14 July 1776. Vernon's sporting traditions were carried on by his nephew, Henry Hilton, whose name appears in the first official list of the Jockey Club, published in 1835

== Children ==
Vernon had three daughters with his wife, the Countess of Upper Ossory, whom he married 6 February 1759:

- Henrietta (13 April 1760 – 20 April 1838), married George Greville, 2nd Earl of Warwick
- Elizabeth (11 October 1762 – 1837)
- Caroline Maria (1770 – 5 February 1833) married "Bobus" Smith

== Sources ==
This article incorporates text from a publication now in the public domain: Lee, Sidney, ed. (1899). "Vernon, Richard (1726-1800)". Dictionary of National Biography. Vol. 58. London: Smith, Elder & Co.

Parliament of Great Britain
Preceded by Richard Rigby; Jeffrey French	Member of Parliament for Tavistock; 1754– 1761; With: Richard Rigby	Succeeded by Richard Rigby; Richard Neville Aldworth
Preceded by Francis Herne; Robert Henley-Ongley	Member of Parliament for Bedford; 1761– 1774; With: Francis Herne 1761-1768; Samuel Whitbread 1768-1774	Succeeded by Sir William Wake, 8th Baronet; Robert Sparrow
Preceded by Thomas Pitt; Hon. Richard Fitzpatrick	Member of Parliament for Okehampton; 1774– 1784; With: Alexander Wedderburn 1774-1778; Humphrey Minchin 1778-1784	Succeeded by John Luxmoore; Thomas Wiggens
Preceded by Viscount Trentham; Archibald Macdonald	Member of Parliament for Newcastle-under-Lyme; 1784–1790; With: Archibald Macdonald	Succeeded by John Leveson-Gower; Archibald Macdonald
