= John Curtis (English politician) =

English politician

John Curtis (c. 1751 – 30 November 1813) was a British Member of Parliament. The son of a Bristol merchant, he was MP for Wells in Somerset from 1782 to 1784; in 1784 he stood at Saltash (Cornwall), where he was defeated, but returned to the House of Commons as MP for Steyning (Sussex) from 1791 to 1794.

Parliament of Great Britain
Preceded by Clement Tudway; Robert Child	Member of Parliament for Wells; 1782–1784; With: Clement Tudway	Succeeded by Clement Tudway; William Thomas Beckford
Preceded by James Martin Lloyd; Henry Thomas Howard	Member of Parliament for Steyning; 1791–1794; With: Sir John Honywood 1791; James Martin Lloyd 1791–92; Samuel Whitbread 1792–94	Succeeded by Samuel Whitbread; John Henniker-Major
