= Thomas Wake =

Thomas Wake may refer to:

- Thomas Wake, 2nd Baron Wake of Liddell (1297–1349)
- Thomas Wake (MP) for Northamptonshire (UK Parliament constituency)
- Thomas Wake (pirate), a late 17th-century privateer and pirate
- A fictional character played by Willem Dafoe in the 2019 film The Lighthouse

== See also ==
- Thomas Wakeman (1846–1886), a Native American who organized the first Sioux Indian YMCA
- Thomas Wakefeld (died 1575), an English academic
- Wake (surname)
