= Robert Sparrow (1741–1822) =

English country landowner and politician

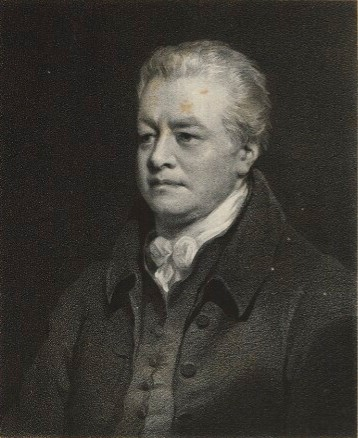
Robert Sparrow

Robert Sparrow (1741–1822) was an English country landowner and politician who sat in the House of Commons between 1774 and 1775.

== Life ==
Sparrow was the eldest son of Robert Sparrow of Worlingham and his wife Anne Bence, daughter of Robert Bence of Henstead, Suffolk and was baptized on 24 October 1741. He was educated at Bury St Edmunds Grammar School, and was admitted at Emmanuel College, Cambridge in 1759 and at Middle Temple in 1759. He succeeded his father to Worlingham Hall on 20 October 1765.

Sparrow was returned as Member of Parliament for Bedford at the 1774 general election on the interest of his brother-in-law Sir Robert Bernard, 5th Baronet but was unseated on petition 23 March 1775. In his short period in Parliament he voted with Opposition on, 22 February 1775 regarding John Wilkes and does not appear to have spoken in the House

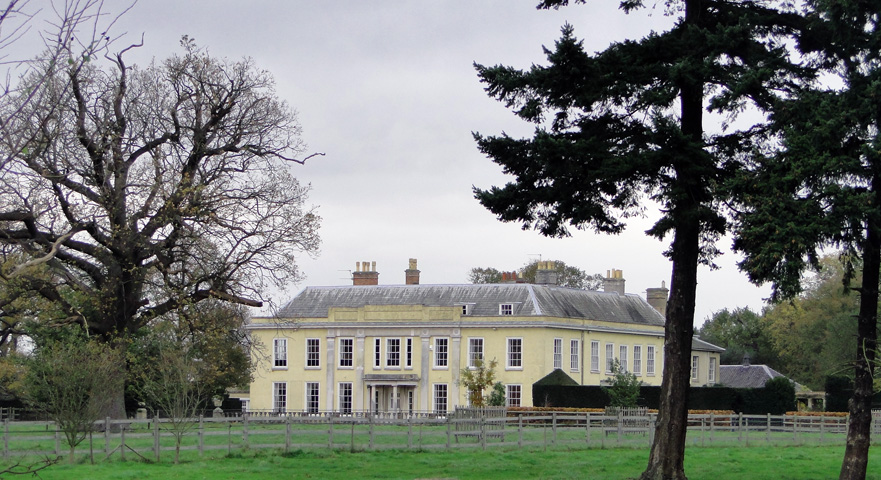
Worlingham Hall

Sparrow was High Sheriff of Suffolk for 1777–8. He considered standing at Bedford again in 1784 but decided against it. In 1785 he decided to rebuild Warlingham Hall and commissioned John Soane to produce plans. Nothing was done with these and Soane was finally paid after threat of litigation in 1796. In 1800 he decided to proceed with development of the hall and commissioned Francis Sandys to produce revised plans which were implemented.

Sparrow died on 8 March 1822.

== Family ==
Sparrow's first marriage was to Mary Bernard, daughter of Sir John Bernard, 4th Baronet, on 8 July 1771. After the death of his first wife on 9 February 1793, Sparrow married secondly Mary Brockhaus of Hardwick, Suffolk in 1797. There were two children of the first marriage:

- Robert Bernard Sparrow, married in 1797 Olivia Acheson, daughter of Arthur Acheson, 2nd Viscount Gosford, and died in 1805, leaving a son Robert Acheson Bernard St. John Sparrow and a daughter Millicent who married George Montagu, 6th Duke of Manchester.
- Mary married in 1795 Olivia's brother Archibald Acheson, 2nd Earl of Gosford and inherited Worlingham Hall.

Parliament of Great Britain
Preceded by Samuel Whitbread; Richard Vernon	Member of Parliament for Bedford; 1774–1775; With: Sir William Wake, 8th Baronet	Succeeded by Sir William Wake, 8th Baronet; Samuel Whitbread
