= Francis Herne =

British House of Commons Member of Parliament between 1754 and 1776

Francis Herne (c1702–1776), was a British politician who sat in the House of Commons between 1754 and 1776.

Herne was the son of Francis Herne of Arminghall Norfolk and his wife Franck Flatman, daughter of Thomas Flatman. His father was a London merchant in the Spanish trade and he was educated at Harrow School from 1714 to 1720 and was admitted at Caius College, Cambridge on 10 October 1720. In 1751, he succeeded to the Luton Hoo estates of a kinswoman Miss Frances Napier. He was High Sheriff of Bedfordshire for 1753–4.

Herne was returned as Member of Parliament for Bedford in 1754 on a compromise with the Duke of Bedford and with the support of the corporation, and was re-elected in 1761. In 1763 he sold Luton Hoo to Lord Bute, and did not stand for Bedford in 1768. He was returned as MP for Camelford in the 1774 general election.

Herne died on 26 September 1776.

Parliament of Great Britain
Preceded by Thomas Gore; John Offley	Member of Parliament for Bedford; 1754– 1768; With: Robert Henley-Ongley; Richard Vernon	Succeeded by Samuel Whitbread; Richard Vernon
Preceded by Charles Phillips; William Wilson	Member of Parliament for Camelford; 1774–1776; With: John Amyand	Succeeded by John Amyand; Sir Ralph Payne
