= John Amyand =

English Whig politician

- Born: 6 November 1751
- Died: 5 June 1780 (aged 28)
- Occupation: Politician

John Amyand (6 November 1751 – 5 June 1780) was an English Whig politician.

He was the second son of Sir George Amyand, a prominent London merchant of huguenot descent. Educated at Eton College, he was elected unopposed as Member of Parliament for Camelford in the general election of 1774. He died in office on 5 June 1780.

Parliament of Great Britain
Preceded by Charles Phillips; William Wilson	Member of Parliament for Camelford; 1774–1780; With: Francis Herne 1774–1776; Sir Ralph Payne 1776–1780	Succeeded by John Pardoe; James Macpherson
