= Bernard Wake =

English cricketeer

Personal information
- Full name: Bernard Wake
- Born: 4 May 1820; Sheffield, Yorkshire, England
- Died: 30 April 1891 (aged 70); Sheffield, Yorkshire, England
- Batting: Unknown
- Bowling: Unknown
- Relatives: William Wake (nephew)

Domestic team information
- Years: Team
- 1849–1851: Yorkshire

Career statistics
Competition	First-class
Matches	10
Runs scored	149
Batting average	9.31
100s/50s	–/–
Top score	25
Balls bowled	640
Wickets	25
Bowling average	11.52
5 wickets in innings	2
10 wickets in match	1
Best bowling	6/34
Catches/stumpings	3/–
- Source: Cricinfo, 7 September 2020

Bernard Wake (4 May 1820 – 30 April 1891) was an English first-class cricketer.

Wake was born at Sheffield in May 1820. He played first-class cricket from 1846 to 1851, playing five matches for Sheffield (aka Yorkshire) against Manchester (aka Lancashire) from 1846 to 1848, before playing five matches for Yorkshire from 1849 to 1851, which included matches against Kent, All England Eleven and Lancashire. In ten first-class matches, Wake scored 149 runs at an average of 9.31, with a high score of 25. As a bowler, he took 25 wickets at a bowling average of 11.52. He twice took a five wicket haul, with both of these coming for Sheffield in 1848, a match in which he took figures of 5 for 47 and 6 for 34. Wake died at Sheffield in April 1891. His nephew, William Wake, later played first-class cricket for Yorkshire County Cricket Club.
