= Ralph Payne, 1st Baron Lavington =

British politician (1739–1807)

The Right Honourable The Lord Lavington KB PC

Captain-General and Governor-in-Chief of the Leeward Islands
- In office 1799–1807

Member of Parliament (MP) for New Woodstock
- In office 1795–1799

Member of Parliament (MP) for Plympton, Devon
- In office 1780–1784

Clerk of the Board of the Green Cloth
- In office 1777–1782

Member of Parliament (MP) for Camelford, Cornwall
- In office 1776–1780

Captain-General and Governor-in-Chief of the Leeward Islands
- In office 1771–1775

Member of Parliament (MP) for Shaftesbury, Dorset
- In office 1768–1771

Personal details
- Born: 19 March 1739 St George, Basseterre, St Kitts
- Died: 3 August 1807 (aged 68) Antigua
- Occupation: Politician and businessman

Ralph Payne, 1st Baron Lavington KB PC (19 March 1739 – 3 August 1807) was a British politician and Governor of the Leeward Islands.

== Early life and education ==
Payne was born in St George, Basseterre on the island of St Kitts in 1739 to Ralph Payne (died 1763)—the Chief Justice of St Kitts—and his wife, Alice. His family was wealthy and originally came from Lavington in Wiltshire, hence Payne's future peerage was as Baron Lavington. He was educated in England at Christ's Hospital school in West Sussex. Following the completion of his time at Christ's, Payne returned to St Kitts where he was "elected a member of the house of assembly and unanimously voted speaker."

== First tenure as Governor of the Leeward Islands ==
Following his marriage, Payne embarked fully on his political career and became a member of parliament for the borough of Shaftesbury; holding this seat from 1768 to 1771. Payne was created a Knight of the Bath (KB) on 18 February 1771 and was also appointed Captain-General and Governor-in-Chief of the Leeward Islands later in 1771. Payne had "inherited a considerable estate from his parents" on the islands.

The islands endured a hurricane in 1772, leading Payne to become the first governor to tour the islands to work out how to resolve the devastation that was caused. It was during his time as governor that he became the patron of artist Thomas Hearne who painted several landscapes depicting events on the Leeward Islands. One of these—depicting Payne himself—is currently in the Victoria and Albert Museum in London. Sir Ralph left the post as governor in 1775.

== Return to England ==
Sir Ralph had returned to England by 1762. He became MP for Camelford in Cornwall between 1776 and 1780. He then became MP for Plympton in Devon; holding this seat until 1784. He was also Clerk of the Board of Green Cloth between 1777 and 1782. He became a supporter of Fox following the end of the war in America, although his political career was restricted for a period due to the increasing influence of William Pitt who became prime minister in 1783. He left England in 1788 for another tour of Europe, returning to England in 1790 to contest the seat of Fowey in Cornwall but was unsuccessful.

He found it difficult to re-establish himself in the British political system with a sharply reduced income from his plantations on the Leeward Islands.

He switched allegiances to become a supporter of Pitt, throwing a party at his house on 15 August 1793 at which the prime minister, Pitt, was present.

He became Baron Lavington in the peerage of Ireland on 1 October 1795. Payne was also elected as MP for New Woodstock in October 1795, retaining this seat until 1799. He did not vote on the abolition of the slave trade during this his fourth tenure as an MP.

== Second tenure as Governor of the Leeward Islands ==
Lord Lavington was re-elected as Governor of the Leeward Islands in February 1799, arriving in Antigua on 12 August 1801. He was also sworn of the Privy Council later in 1799. Payne remained governor until his death in 1807.

== Family ==
On 1 September 1767 at St George's in Hanover Square, London, he married Frances Lambertine Christiana Charlotte Harriet Theresa de Kolbel, the daughter of a German nobleman, without issue. He owned Carlisle's Estate in St George, Antigua, with over 300 slaves but he died almost destitute and the estate was bought by Reid and Dixon. Payne was involved in no claim for compensation at the time of abolition of slavery.

His wife was well connected and mixed in high social circles, including with Queen Charlotte. Payne therefore made good contacts for his political career through his marriage; however, his time with Frances was not a particularly happy one. He owned Carlisle's Estate in St George, Antigua, with over 300 slaves but he died almost destitute and the estate was bought by Reid and Dixon. Payne was involved in no claim for compensation at the time of abolition of slavery.

He died at Government House, Leeward Islands, on 3 August 1807. He was buried the next day at his plantation, Carlisles, and a marble monument to him was erected in the parish church of St John's in Antigua. He died without children and in a dire economic situation, leaving his wife, Lady Lavington, to sustain herself on an annual income of just £300; an extremely low amount for the widow of a peer and relatively influential politician, although it would have allowed her to keep a servant. Lady Lavington died at Hampton Court Palace in London, UK on 2 May 1830. According to biographer W.P. Courtney, Lord Lavington's "career mirrored the meteoric rise and downfall of absentee sugar planters in Britain."

== Styles and honours ==
- Mr Ralph Payne (1739–1768)
- Mr Ralph Payne MP (1768–1771)
- Sir Ralph Payne KB (1771–1776)
- Sir Ralph Payne KB MP (1776–1784)
- Sir Ralph Payne KB (1784–1795)
- The Rt. Hon. The Lord Lavington KB (1795–1795)
- The Rt. Hon. The Lord Lavington KB MP (1795–1799)
- The Rt. Hon. The Lord Lavington KB PC (1799–1807)

== Arms ==
Coat of arms of Baron Lavington
Coronet Baron's coronet Escutcheon Gules, a fesse between two lions passant Argent.

Government offices
Preceded by William Woodley	Governor of the Leeward Islands; 1771–1776	Succeeded by William Mathew Burt
Preceded by Charles Leigh	Governor of the Leeward Islands; 1799–1807	Succeeded by Hugh Elliot
Parliament of Great Britain
Preceded by Samuel Touchet; Sir Gilbert Heathcote, Bt	Member of Parliament for Shaftesbury; 1768–1771; With: William Chaffin Grove	Succeeded by William Chaffin Grove; Francis Sykes
Preceded by Francis Herne; John Amyand	Member of Parliament for Camelford; 1776–1780; With: John Amyand	Succeeded by John Pardoe; James Macpherson
Preceded by John Durand; William Fullarton	Member of Parliament for Plympton Erle; 1780–1784; With: Viscount Cranborne to November 1780; Hon. James Stuart from November 1780	Succeeded by Paul Treby Ourry; John Stephenson
Preceded by Sir Henry Dashwood, Bt; Lord Henry John Spencer	Member of Parliament for New Woodstock; 1795–1799; With: Sir Henry Dashwood, Bt	Succeeded by Sir Henry Dashwood, Bt; Charles Moore
