= Courteenhall House =

Grade II* listed house in South Northamptonshire, United Kingdom

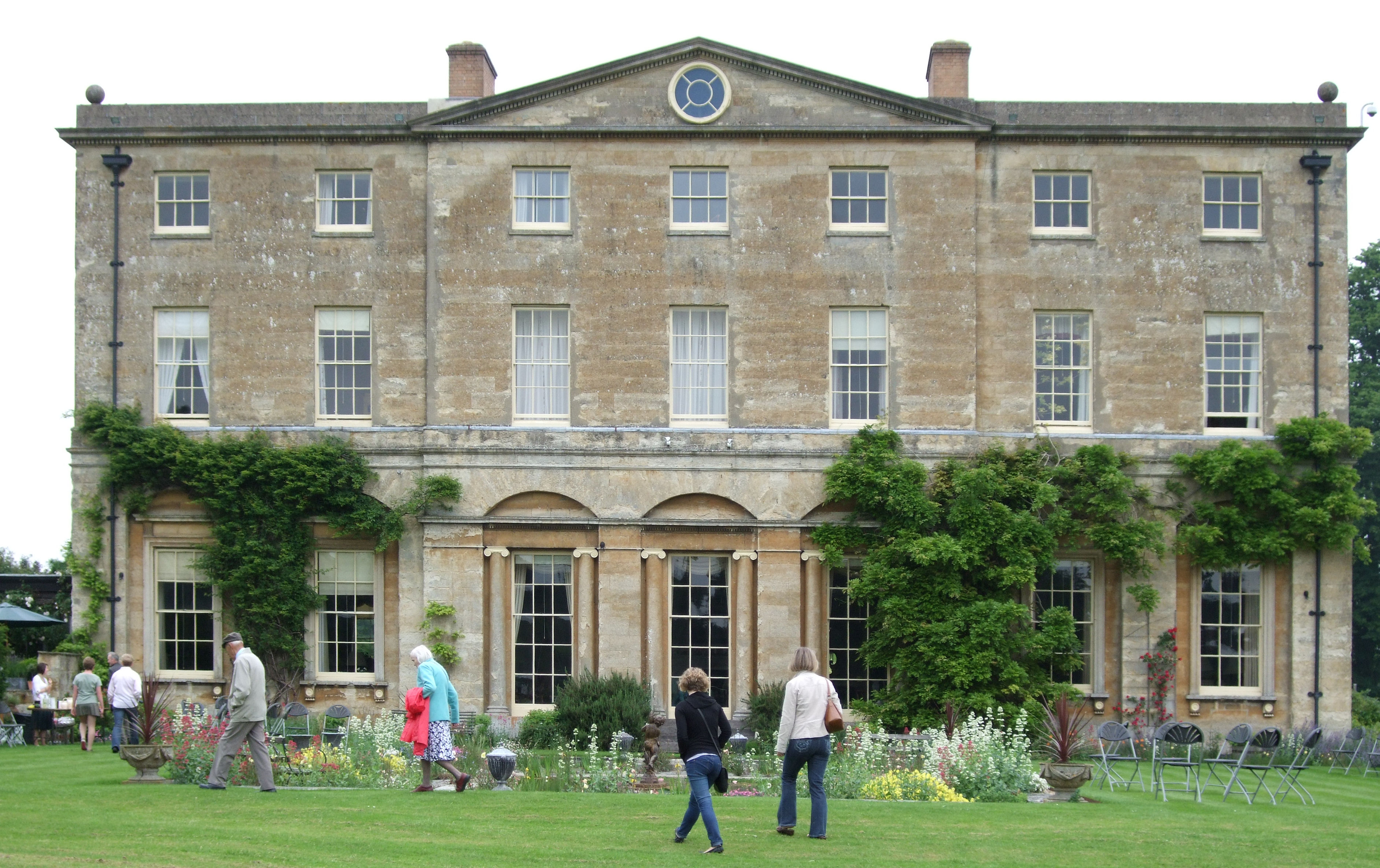
- "great restraint but great sensitivity"

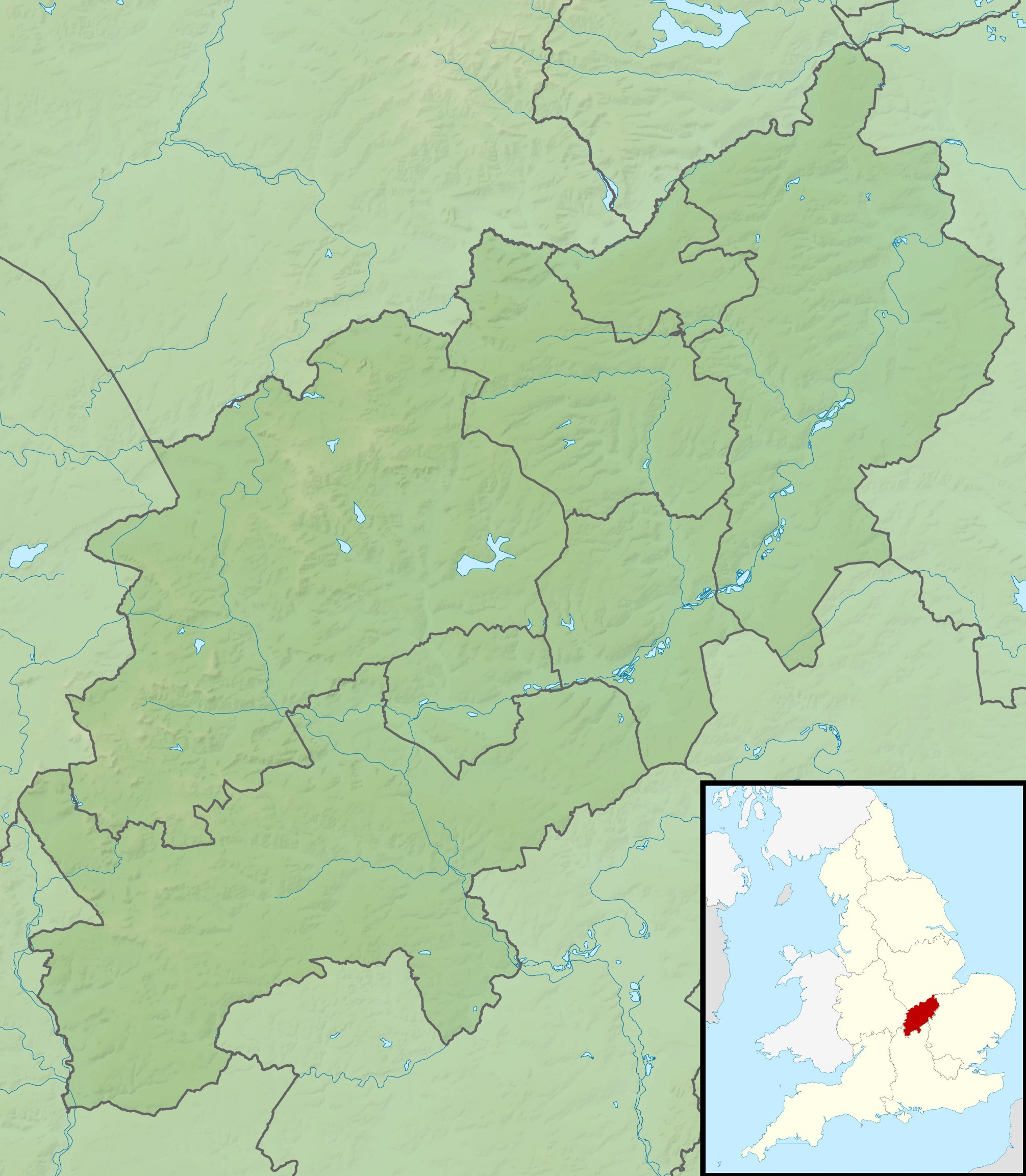
- Location within Northamptonshire
- 52.0721°N 1.24°W
- Type: House
- Location: Courteenhall, Northamptonshire

History
- Built: 1791-1793

Site notes
- Architect: Samuel Saxon
- Architectural style: Neoclassical
- Owner: Wake baronets

Listed Building – Grade II*
- Official name: Courteenhall House and Attached Offices
- Designated: 23 August 1955
- Reference no.: 1189193

Listed Building – Grade II*
- Official name: Courteenhall House Stable Block and attached coach houses, stables and barn
- Designated: 23 August 1955
- Reference no.: 1371591

National Register of Historic Parks and Gardens
- Official name: Courteenhall
- Designated: 25 June 1984
- Reference no.: 1001029

Courteenhall House, Courteenhall, Northamptonshire, England is an 18th-century country house built for Sir William Wake, 9th Baronet. Wake's architect was Samuel Saxon. The architectural style of the house is Neoclassical, and it is described by Pevsner as having been built with "great restraint but great sensitivity". Construction took place between 1791 and 1793. The grounds were laid out by Humphry Repton. The house remains the private home of the Wake family. Courteenhall House is a Grade II* listed building. The surrounding gardens and parkland are listed Grade II.

== History ==
The original estate at Courteenhall was a possession of St James's Abbey at Northampton. At the Dissolution of the monasteries it was bought by the Ouseleys. The estate came into the possession of the Wake baronets in the 18th century. (Note: The Courteenhall website differs from the main published sources on a number of points regarding the history of the house and estate. The family website suggests that the house was built by the 10th baronet and that the estate came to the family in the mid-17th rather than mid-18th century.) The Wakes had farmed in Northamptonshire since the mid-13th century. On the advice of Humphry Repton, Sir William Wake (1768–1846) built a new house, on higher ground to the north west of the Ouseley's house. His architect, also a recommendation of Repton, was Samuel Saxon, who had trained in the office of Sir William Chambers. (Note: Samuel Saxon was not a prolific architect. His other principal known work is the Northampton Infirmary, which is contemporaneous with Courteenhall, and may have contributed to his appointment.) The house was built between 1791 and 1793. Courteenhall remains the private home of the Wake family but is occasionally open for events, or for private hire.

== Architecture and description ==
The house is of three storeys and seven bays, with a hipped roof. It is built of local limestone ashlar. The architectural style is neoclassical and Pevsner repeatedly references the sophisticated and refined style of the design. The interior follows a typical 18th century pattern, with entrance hall, drawing room, dining room and library.

The house is a Grade I listed building. The stable block, with attached coach houses, stables and a barn, is also listed Grade II*. The stables have been attributed to John Carr. The surrounding garden and parkland, notable for its trees, is designated Grade II on the Register of Historic Parks and Gardens of Special Historic Interest in England. The park was laid out by Repton.

== Sources ==
- Bailey, Bruce; Pevsner, Nikolaus; Cherry, Bridget (2013). Northamptonshire. The Buildings Of England. New Haven, US and London: Yale University Press. ISBN 978-0-300-18507-2. OCLC 964790363.
- Talbott, Lorna (2020). Northampton in 50 Buildings. Stroud, UK: Amberley Publishing. ISBN 978-1-445-69514-3.
