= John Geekie =

British Governor of Bombay

John Geekie was the British governor of Bombay for 12 days between 15 and 26 November 1742, during the rule of the Honourable East India Company.

Political offices
Preceded by Stephen Law	Governor of Bombay; 1742	Succeeded by William Wake
