= Maurice Taylor (British Army officer) =

British lieutenant-general

Lieutenant-General Sir Maurice Taylor KCB CMG DSO
- Born: 31 May 1881
- Died: 6 April 1960 (aged 78); Cornwall, England
- Military career
- Allegiance: United Kingdom
- Branch: British Army
- Service years: 1900–1941
- Rank: Lieutenant-General
- Service number: 962
- Unit: Royal Engineers
- Commands: 46th (North Midland) Division; 166th (South Lancashire) Brigade
- Conflicts: First World War; Second World War
- Awards: Knight Commander of the Order of the Bath; Companion of the Order of St Michael and St George; Distinguished Service Order; Mentioned in Despatches (7)

Lieutenant-General Sir Maurice Grove Taylor, KCB, CMG, DSO (31 May 1881 – 6 April 1960) was a British Army officer.

== Military career ==
After being educated at St. Mark's School, Windsor and the Royal Military Academy, Woolwich, Taylor was commissioned into the Royal Engineers on 2 May 1900. He married in 1906 and 1910 saw him as a captain. After attending the Staff College, Camberley, he was a staff officer with Scottish Command.

Initially serving as a railway transportation officer, he later saw action on the Western Front during the First World War, for which he was appointed a Companion of the Distinguished Service Order. He was also mentioned in despatches seven times during the war.

After the war Taylor became Deputy Director of Movements at the War Office in 1919, Senior Instructor at the Staff College in 1921 and Assistant Quartermaster-General at Eastern Command in 1925. He went on to become commander of 166th (South Lancashire) Brigade in December 1927, General Officer Commanding the 46th (North Midland) Division in December 1932 and Major-General, Administration at Aldershot Command in April 1934. After that he became Deputy Master-General of the Ordnance at the War Office in December 1937 and then, on 1 August 1939, was made senior military adviser to the Ministry of Supply.

He held this appointment until retiring from the army in 1941, during the Second World War.

== Works ==
- A Little Knight Music – Selected Works by Sir Maurice Grove Taylor.

== Bibliography ==
- Smart, Nick (2005). Biographical Dictionary of British Generals of the Second World War. Barnesley: Pen & Sword. ISBN 1844150496.

Military offices
Preceded by Oswald Borrett	GOC 46th (North Midland) Division; 1932–1934	Succeeded by Sir Hereward Wake
