= Samuel Whitbread (1720–1796) =

British brewer and politician (1720–1796)

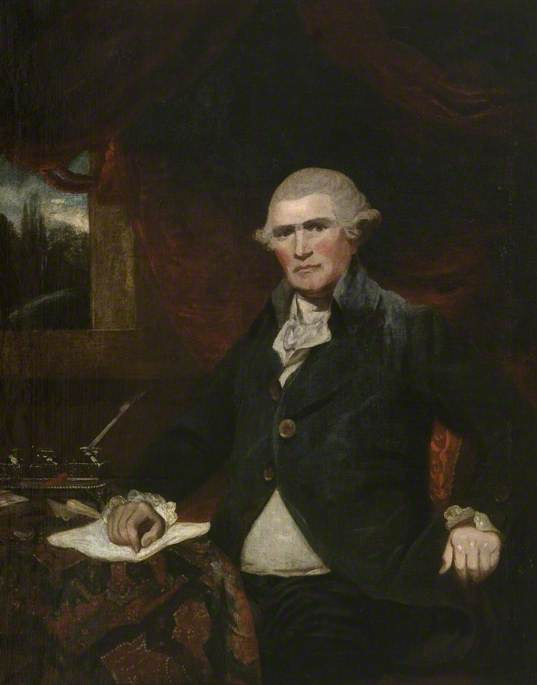
- Portrait by Samuel William Reynolds, c. 1809

Member of the Great Britain Parliament for Bedford
- In office 1768–1774 Serving with Richard Vernon
- Preceded by: Francis Herne; Richard Vernon
- Succeeded by: Sir William Wake, Bt; Robert Sparrow

Member of the Great Britain Parliament for Bedford
- In office 1775–1790 Serving with: Sir William Wake, Bt 1775–1784; William MacDowall Colhoun 1784–1790
- Preceded by: Sir William Wake, Bt; Robert Sparrow
- Succeeded by: William MacDowall Colhoun; Samuel Whitbread

Member of the Great Britain Parliament for Steyning
- In office 1792–1796 Serving with: John Curtis 1792–1794; John Henniker-Major 1794–1796
- Preceded by: John Curtis; James Lloyd
- Succeeded by: John Henniker-Major; James Lloyd

Personal details
- Born: 20 August 1720 Cardington, Bedfordshire, England
- Died: 11 June 1796 (aged 75)
- Children: Samuel Whitbread
- Occupation: Brewer

Samuel Whitbread (30 August 1720 – 11 June 1796) was a British brewer and politician. In 1742, he established a brewery that in 1799 became Whitbread & Co Ltd.

== Early years ==
Samuel Whitbread was born on 20 August 1720 at Cardington in Bedfordshire, the seventh of eight children of Henry Whitbread. At 12, he received two years' education with a local clergyman, before being sent at age 14 to London to live with family (most likely, his uncle). At age 16, his family paid £300 for him to be taken as an apprentice at a brewery under John Wightman (Master of the Brewers' Company from 1734 to 1735).

== Brewing ==
After learning the brewery trade, Samuel Whitbread went into partnership with Godfrey and Thomas Shewell in 1742, investing £2,600 in two of the Shewell's small breweries, the Goat Brewhouse (where porter was produced) in Old Street and a brewery nearby in Brick Lane (used to produce pale and amber beers).

Demand for the strong, black porter had begun to grow and Whitbread identified the need for scale to ensure commercial success, moving the business to larger premises on the site of the derelict Kings Head Brewery in Chiswell Street in 1750.

Starting over, Whitbread invested in all the latest technology to industrialize production, storing the beer in large vats. The brewery was also one of the first to employ a steam engine (purchasing a sun and planet gear engine, the Whitbread Engine, from James Watt's company in 1785). While not the first to discover Porter production, Whitbread became the first to exploit it commercially on a large scale and this coincided with an increase in beer consumption in the UK, following regulations to limit the sale of gin owing to the excesses of the Gin Craze.

By 1760, it had become the second largest brewery in London (producing almost 64,000 barrels annually). By 1770 Whitbread had bought out his partners for £30,000. By the end of the century, Whitbread's business was London's biggest producer of beer, producing 202,000 barrels in 1796. In May 1787 the brewery was visited by King George III and Queen Charlotte. By 1793, Whitbread had become a Freeman of the Brewers' Company.

== Member of Parliament ==
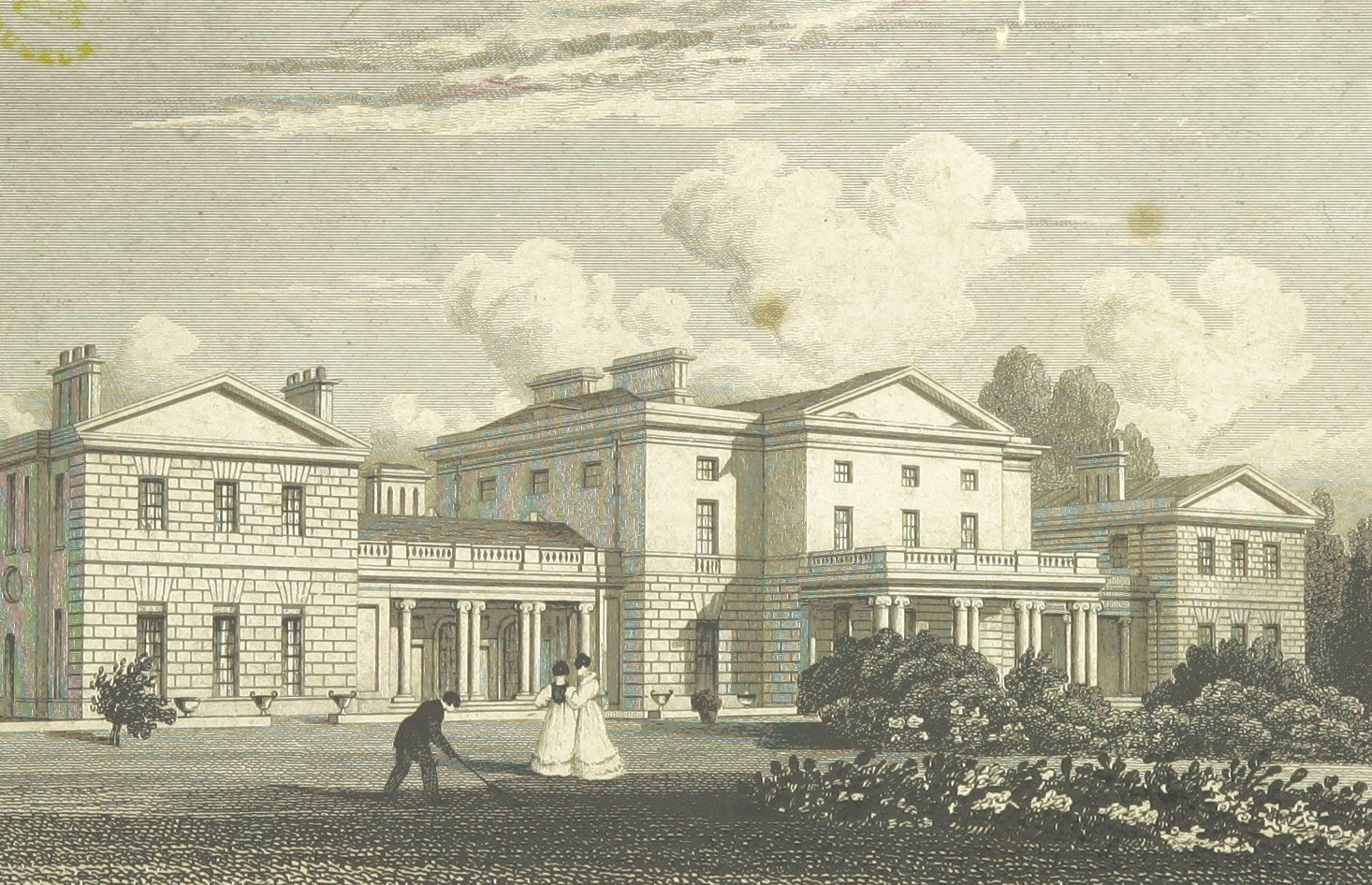
Southill Park

Whitbread was appointed High Sheriff of Hertfordshire for 1767–68 and elected Member of Parliament for Bedford in 1768, and held the seat until 1790, and then represented Steyning from 1792 to 1796. He was an early supporter of the abolition of slavery, and took part in some of the anti-slavery debates of 1788 in the House of Commons.

== Family ==
Whitbread married firstly Harriet Hayton, by whom he had two daughters, one of whom, Emma Maria Elizabeth Whitbread, married Henry St John, 13th Baron St John of Bletso, and one son, the politician, Samuel Whitbread. The other daughter, Harriet, married James Gordon MP. Harriet died in 1769 and is buried in Cardington Parish Church. Her memorial is by Richard Hayward.

He married secondly Lady Mary Cornwallis (1736–70) on 13 August 1769, eldest daughter of Charles Cornwallis, 1st Earl Cornwallis, with whom he had one daughter, Mary Whitbread (1770–1858). Mary married Sir George Grey, 1st Baronet, 3rd son of Charles Grey, Lord Howick.

Whitbread became wealthy from the success of his brewery and bought several large estates: these included Lord Torrington's Southill Park, Elstow Manor, and other substantial property in Bedfordshire and High House, Purfleet, Essex. His real estate purchases were worth in the region of £400,000—equal to over £8 million in 1992.

Whitbread died on 11 June 1796 at Bedwell Park. The Gentleman's Magazine speculated that he was "worth over a million pounds" (equivalent to £97,770,000 in 2025).

Parliament of Great Britain
| Preceded by Francis Herne; Richard Vernon | Member for Bedford; 1768–1774; With: Richard Vernon | Succeeded by Sir William Wake, Bt; Robert Sparrow |
| Preceded by Sir William Wake, Bt; Robert Sparrow | Member for Bedford; 1775–1790; With: Sir William Wake, Bt 1775–1784; William MacDowall Colhoun 1784–1790 | Succeeded by William MacDowall Colhoun; Samuel Whitbread |
| Preceded by John Curtis; James Lloyd | Member of Parliament for Steyning; 1792–1796; With: John Curtis 1792–1794; John Henniker-Major 1794–1796 | Succeeded by John Henniker-Major; James Lloyd |
