= Sir Hereward Wake, 14th Baronet =

British Army officer

Major Sir Hereward Wake, 14th Baronet, MC (7 October 1916 – 11 December 2017) was a British Army officer and countryman, he was educated at Sandroyd School and Eton College. Wounded in World War II while serving as a major in the King's Royal Rifle Corps, he served as Northamptonshire's High Sheriff in 1955 and Vice-Lieutenant from 1984 to 1991.

He married Julia Lees in 1952: the couple had three daughters and one son, Hereward, who succeeded his father as the 15th Baronet. The family lived at Courteenhall in Northamptonshire.

== See also ==
- Wake baronets

Baronetage of England
Preceded by Hereward Wake	Baronet (of Clevedon); 1963–2017	Succeeded by Hereward Charles Wake
