= Jenny Wake =

New Zealand actor and theatre director

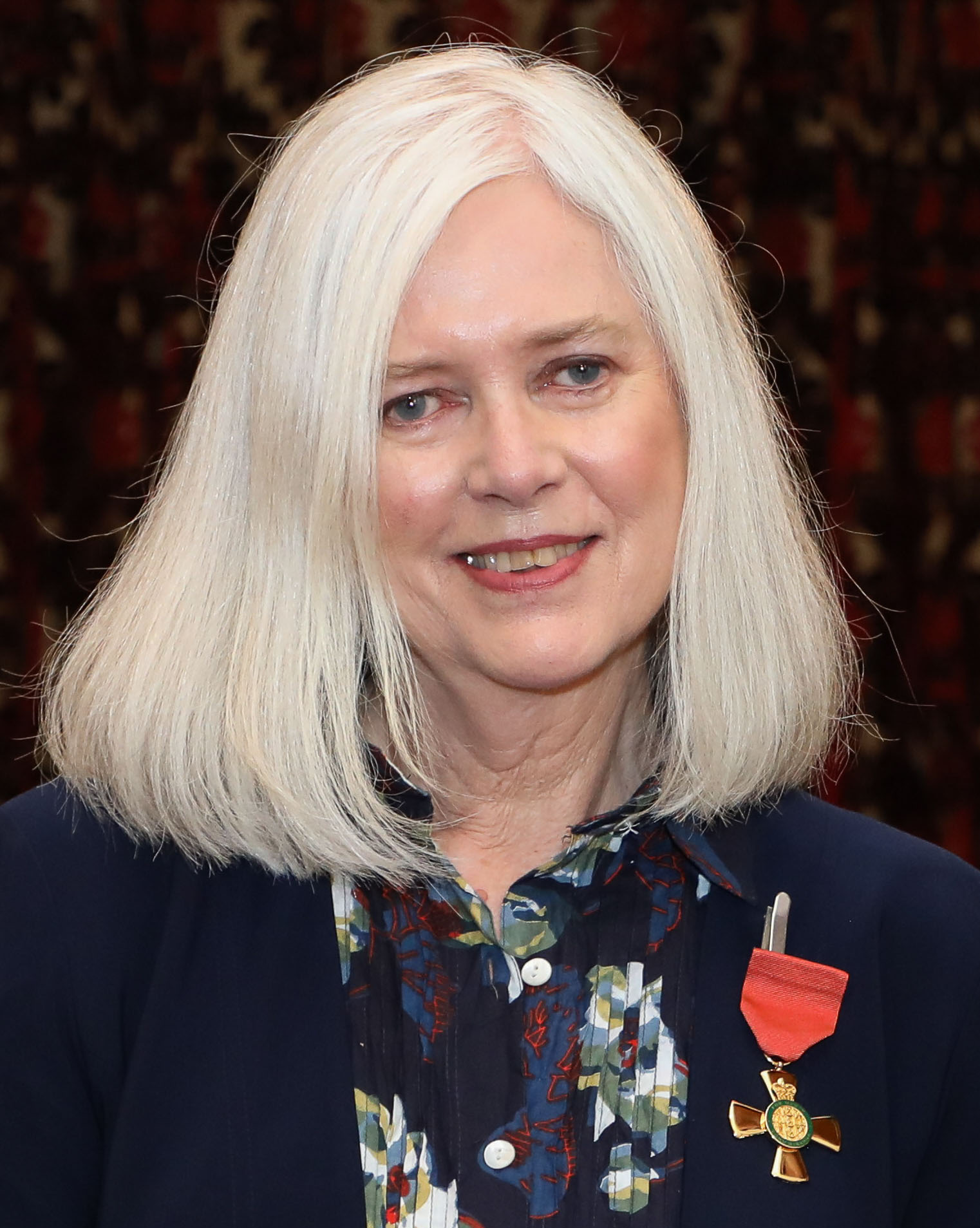
Wake in 2025

Jennifer Mary Wake ONZM is a New Zealand actor and theatre director. In 1991, she founded Calico Young People's Theatre.

== Biography ==
Wake completed a master's degree in children’s theatre at Humboldt State University in California. She specialises in children's television and theatre productions and has worked on television series Play School and What Now.

In the late 1980s Wake worked at the Downstage Theatre in Wellington, New Zealand as the youth activities director, and in 1991 she founded a theatre company focused on youth, Calico Young People's Theatre. Wake has adapted stories for the stage, including Maurice Gee's The Halfmen of O and Hans Christian Andersen's The Snow Queen.

In the 2025 King’s Birthday Honours, Wake was appointed an Officer of the New Zealand Order of Merit, for services to theatre and television.
