= William Tryon =

British Army officer and colonial administrator (1729–1788)

Lieutenant-General William Tryon
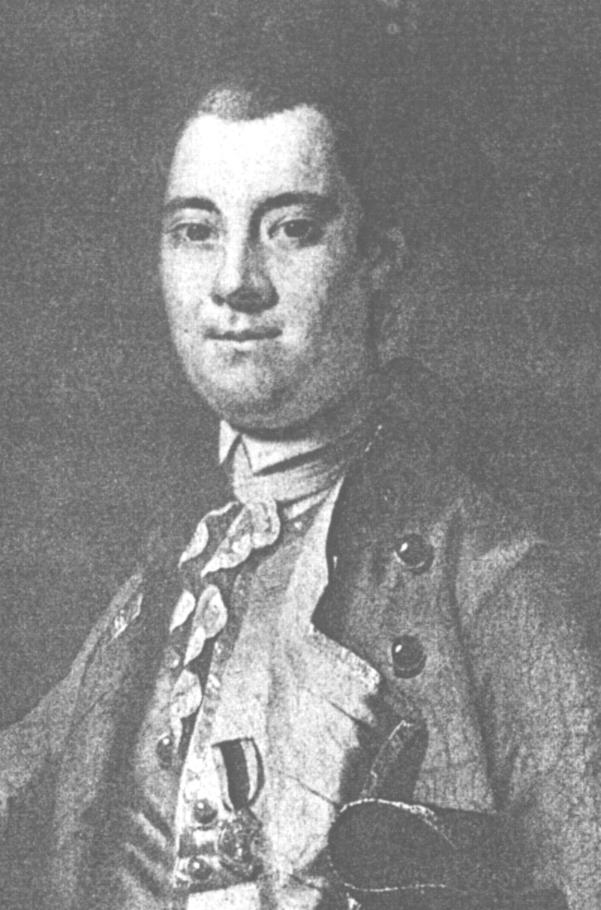
- Alleged portrait, 1767

Governor of North Carolina
- In office 27 October 1764 – 30 June 1771
- Monarch: George III
- Preceded by: Arthur Dobbs
- Succeeded by: James Hasell (acting)

Governor of New York
- In office 1771–1777
- Monarch: George III
- Preceded by: Cadwallader Colden (acting)
- Succeeded by: James Robertson (in British-controlled areas); George Clinton (in Patriot-controlled areas)

Personal details
- Born: 8 June 1729 Norbury Park, Surrey, England
- Died: 27 January 1788 (aged 58) London, England
- Resting place: St Mary's Church, Twickenham
- Spouse: Margaret Wake
- Children: 2

Military service
- Branch: British Army
- Years of service: 1751–1788
- Rank: Lieutenant-General
- Commands: 70th Regiment of Foot; 29th Regiment of Foot
- Battles/wars: Seven Years' War; Raid on Cherbourg; Battle of St Cast; War of the Regulation; Battle of Alamance; American War of Independence; Battle of Ridgefield

Lieutenant-General William Tryon (8 June 1729 – 27 January 1788) was a British Army officer and colonial administrator who served as governor of North Carolina from 1764 to 1771 and the governor of New York from 1771 to 1777. He also served during the Seven Years' War, the War of the Regulation, and the American War of Independence.

== Early life and career ==
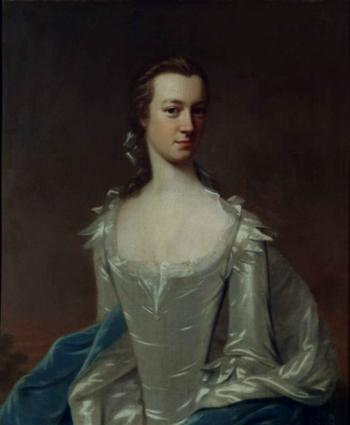
Margaret Tryon

Tryon was born on 8 June 1729 at the Tryon family's seat at Norbury Park, Surrey, the son of Charles Tryon and Lady Mary Shirley. His maternal grandfather was Robert Shirley, 1st Earl Ferrers. In 1751, Tryon enlisted in the British Army as a lieutenant in the 1st Regiment of Foot Guards and was promoted to the rank of captain later that year. In 1758, Tryon was promoted to lieutenant-colonel.

== Seven Years' War ==
During the Seven Years' War, Tryon and his regiment were involved in the British raid on Cherbourg. They landed at Cherbourg and destroyed all military facilities. In September, they reembarked for St Malo, where the operation went smoothly until the withdrawal, when they came under intense fire from the French at the Battle of Saint Cast. Tryon was wounded in the thigh and head.

== Governor of North Carolina ==
On 26 April 1764, through family connections, Tryon obtained the position of acting lieutenant governor of the Province of North Carolina. He arrived in North Carolina with his family, including a young daughter, and architect John Hawks, in early October to find that the previous governor, Arthur Dobbs, had not left. He said that he would not be leaving until May. Tryon found himself with no income (although he was Lieutenant Governor). In 1765, a house called Russelborough on the Cape Fear River near Brunswick Town was renovated to serve as Tryon's residence while he acted as Lieutenant Governor.

Tryon assumed his position as acting governor when Dobbs died on 28 March 1765. On 10 July, the King appointed him to the office of governor. After assuming the office of governor, Tryon worked to expand the Church of England in North Carolina. There were only five Anglican clergy members in North Carolina at that time. Tryon pushed for the completion of abandoned construction projects of Anglican churches in Brunswick Town, Wilmington, Edenton, and New Bern. Tryon appointed members of the clergy for these churches and encouraged the construction of new churches, especially in rural areas.

There was strong opposition in North Carolina to the Stamp Act of 1765. When the Stamp Act Congress was held, the colonial assembly was not in session, hence delegates could not be selected to attend. Tryon refused to allow meetings of the Assembly from 18 May 1765 to 3 November 1766 to prevent the Assembly from passing a resolution in opposition to the Stamp Act. Tryon said that he was personally opposed to the Stamp Act and that he offered to pay the taxes on all stamped paper on which he was entitled to fees. Tryon requested troops to enforce the act, but instead he was informed on 25 June 1766 that the act was repealed.

Tryon also composed plans for an elaborate governor's mansion, which would also function as a central location for government business; he worked with Hawks during 1764 and 1765 to draw up plans for an elaborate home. In December 1766, the North Carolina legislature authorized £5,000 for the building of Tryon's mansion. Tryon told the legislature that the sum was not substantial enough for the plans he and Hawks had created; building it "in the plainest manner" would cost no less than £10,000 without including the outbuildings he envisioned. Hawks agreed to supervise the construction for three years and went to Philadelphia at Tryon's behest to hire workers; Tryon said native North Carolina workers would not know how to construct such a building.

Tryon was eventually able to convince the legislature to increase taxes to help pay for the project. The unpopularity of the new taxes spawned the derogatory nickname 'Tryon Palace'. In 1770, Tryon moved into the completed mansion. The house was "a monument of opulence and elegance extraordinary in the American colonies." Although he accomplished some notable improvements in the colony, such as the creation of a postal service in 1769, Tryon is most noted for suppressing the War of the Regulation in western North Carolina during the period from 1768 to 1771. The uprising was caused partly by taxation imposed to pay for Tryon Palace at New Bern (which Tryon made the provincial capital) and partly by tax abuse and fraud by western officials.

Matters came to a head in May 1771, when colonial militia defeated 2,000 Regulators in the Battle of Alamance. Following the battle, Tryon ordered the execution of seven alleged Regulators, convicted by Judge Richard Henderson. Most of the men were accused of violating the Riot Act, a crime temporarily made a capital offense by the General Assembly. The executed men included James Few, Benjamin Merrill, Enoch Pugh, Robert Matear, "Captain" Robert Messer, Bryant Austin Sr, and one other. Six other convicted Regulators—Forrester Mercer, James Stewart, James Emmerson, Herman Cox, William Brown, and James Copeland—were pardoned by King George III and released by Tryon.

The Regulator uprising is viewed by some historians as a precursor to the American Revolution. Tryon then raised taxes again to pay for the militia's campaign against the Regulators. Tryon's governorship ended, and he left North Carolina on 30 June 1771. Tryon Palace was reconstructed in the 1950s using the original architectural plans drawn by John Hawks. Many years later, in an op-ed for the Rocky Mount Telegram explaining why he wanted to limit veto power for the North Carolina governor, North Carolina State Senator Roy Cooper wrote, "Governor Tryon was hated as he ruled in opulent splendor from his palace."

== Governor of New York ==
On 8 July 1771, Tryon arrived in the Province of New York and became its governor. In 1771 and 1772 he was successful in having the assembly appropriate funds for the quartering of British troops and also on 18 March 1772 the establishment of a militia. Funds were also appropriated for the rebuilding of New York City's defenses. In 1772, opposition in New York was strong against the Tea Act. In December, the Sons of Liberty "persuaded" the tea agents to resign. Tryon proposed to land the tea and store it at Fort George.

The Sons of Liberty were opposed and Alexander McDougall said, "prevent the landing, and kill [the] governor and all the council". When news of the Boston Tea Party arrived on 22 December, Tryon gave up trying to land the tea. He told London the tea could be brought ashore "only under the protection of the point of the bayonet, and muzzle of cannon, and even then I do not see how consumption could be effected". In 1774, the New Yorkers dumped their own consignment of tea into the harbor. On 29 December 1773 the governor's mansion and all its contents were destroyed by fire. The New York Assembly appropriated five thousand pounds for his losses.

== American Revolutionary War ==
Coat of Arms of William Tryon

On 7 April 1774, Tryon departed for a trip to England, and Cadwallader Colden was the acting governor of New York in his absence. Tryon arrived back in New York on 25 June 1775 after the American Revolutionary War had begun. Isaac Sears returned in July from the Continental Congress with orders to put Tryon under arrest, but George Washington had ordered Philip Schuyler, the commander in New York, to leave Tryon alone. On 19 October 1775, he was compelled to seek refuge on the British sloop-of-war Halifax in New York Harbor. He then set up an offshore headquarters nearby on board the merchant ship Duchess of Gordon, moored at Sandy Hook. In 1776, he dissolved the assembly and called for new elections in February. The new assembly was for independence, so Tryon dissolved it.

During the spring and summer of 1776, Tryon and New York City mayor David Mathews conspired in a miserably bungled plot to kidnap General Washington and to assassinate his chief officers. Washington's bodyguard Thomas Hickey was involved in the plot. Hickey had been in prison for passing counterfeit money, and he bragged to his cellmate Isaac Ketcham about the kidnapping plot. Ketcham revealed it to authorities in an effort to gain his own freedom. Hickey was court-martialled and hanged for mutiny on 28 June 1776. In June, Admiral Howe arrived in New York City with the British army. Howe placed New York under martial law with James Robertson as the military commander. Tryon retained his nominal title as governor, but with little power.

In early 1777, Tryon was given the rank of major-general of the provincials. In April, he was ordered to invade Connecticut and march on the city of Danbury to destroy an arsenal there. Tryon established his headquarters at the house of a Loyalist named Joseph Dibble, at the south end of the village and near the public stores. Generals Agnew and Erskine made their headquarters in a house near the bridge, at the upper end of the main street. All the other houses in the village were quartered with British troops for the night. Tryon engaged and defeated Patriot forces under the command of General David Wooster and Benedict Arnold at the Battle of Ridgefield when attempting to return to an invasion fleet anchored in Westport. In May 1778, he was given the rank of major-general in the British army, but in America only, and also the colonelcy of the 70th Regiment of Foot. He became the commander of all British forces on Long Island.

Tryon had long advocated engaging in raids on Patriot towns, but General Henry Clinton turned down his proposals. In July 1779, he commanded a series of raids on the Connecticut coast, attacking New Haven, Fairfield, and Norwalk, burning and plundering most of Fairfield and Norwalk. His raids were intended to draw Patriot forces away from the defense of the Hudson valley. In spite of pressure from Governor Jonathan Trumbull, George Washington did not move his troops. Patriot newspapers condemned him for making war on "women and children", and Clinton was also indignant about Tryon disobeying his orders. Tryon found approval of his conduct from Lord George Germain, but Clinton refused to give him any further significant commands. In September 1780, Tryon returned to his home in London. He directed the affairs of the 70th Regiment, who were still in America, and he gave directions in 1783 for the regiment to be brought back to England for disbandment. In 1782, he was promoted to the rank of lieutenant-general. In 1784, he was made the colonel of the 29th Regiment of Foot, which was stationed in Canada.

== Death ==
Tryon died at his home in London on 27 January 1788 and was buried at St Mary's Church, Twickenham, Middlesex, England.

== Personal life ==
Tryon had a daughter by Mary Stanton, whom he never married. In 1757, he married Margaret Wake, a London heiress with a dowry of 30,000 pounds (equivalent to £4,655,635 in 2025). Her father, William, had been the East India Company's Governor in Bombay from 1742–50, and had died on a ship off the Cape of Good Hope on the voyage home. Margaret was later the namesake of Wake County, North Carolina, where Raleigh is located.

== Legacy ==
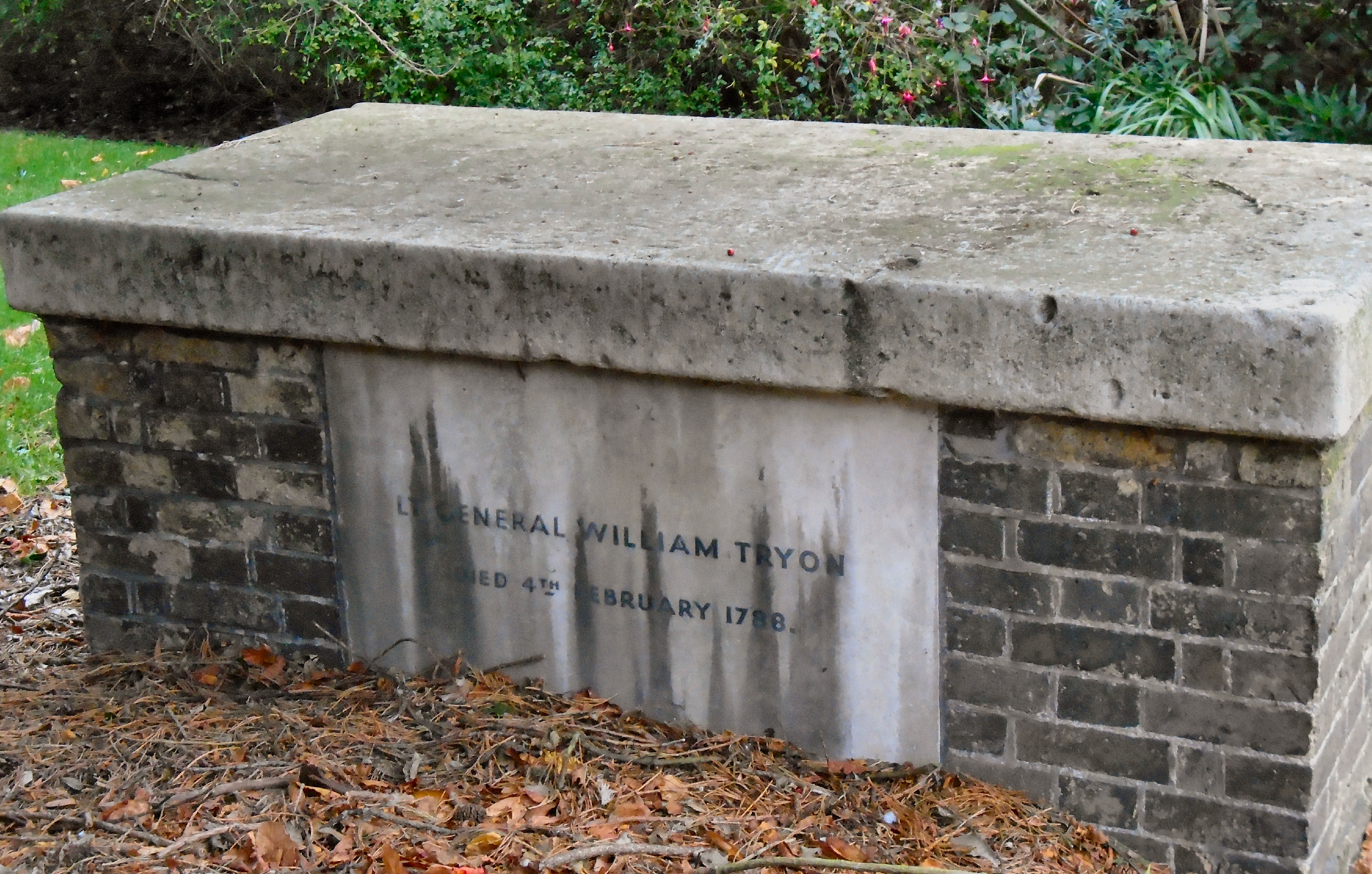
Tryon's tomb at St Mary's Church, Twickenham, Middlesex, England

According to American historian Scott M. Smith, Tryon "achieved a reputation as a fair, honest and capable administrator. His signature accomplishment in this vein was the improvement of the colony’s postal service, a crucial link between the important commercial centers in South Carolina and Virginia." After assuming the office of North Carolina governor in 1765, Tryon stated "I shall ever think it equally my duty to preserve the People in their constitutional liberty; as to maintain inviolate the Just and necessary Rights of the Crown", a statement which Smith noted "would haunt Tryon for the rest of his life."

During the Revolutionary War, Tryon's raids in Connecticut were denounced by Patriot leaders, and president of the Continental Congress Henry Laurens wrote in 1779 that Tryon's memory ought to be "held in everlasting contempt." In 1930, business magnate John D. Rockefeller donated land in New York City to the municipal authorities, which created Fort Tryon Park. Later that year, local historian Reginald Pelham Bolton argued the park should have its name changed to "Forest Hill Park" because "the Tryon name was distasteful for patriotic and historical reasons."

== Honors ==
The Cherokees gave Tryon the name of "Wolf" for his dealings in setting a boundary for them in the western part of the colony.

- Tryon County, New York and Tryon County, North Carolina were both named for him (though later renamed).
- The town of Tryon, North Carolina
- Tryon Palace in New Bern, North Carolina
- Tryon, Prince Edward Island
- Tryon Amateur Radio Club, named for the Tryon County in NY, this club is located in Johnstown, NY, now Fulton County.
- His name is still preserved at Fort Tryon Park in Manhattan in New York City, which was held by the British throughout most of the American Revolution.
- Tryon's name remained for many years on Tryon Row, a street which ran between Centre Street and Park Row in lower Manhattan. Tryon Row was the location of the New York Free School No. 1, at the corner of Chatham Street, which was one of the city's first public schools, in the early 19th century. The street's path is now occupied by the sidewalk and gardens south of the Manhattan Municipal Building.
- Tryon Avenue in the Norwood section of the Bronx
- Tryon Hills is a prominent neighborhood in Charlotte, North Carolina; Tryon Street is a major thoroughfare in that city
- Tryon Road in Raleigh, North Carolina (in Wake County, named after Tryon's wife Margaret Wake)
- Tryon Street in Burlington, North Carolina
- Tryon Street in Hillsborough, North Carolina
- Tryon Street in Albany, New York
- Tryon Street in South Glastonbury, Connecticut that travels along the banks of the Connecticut River. The adjacent Tryon Farms was featured in Glastonbury's yearly 2007 calendar. Sarah Jane Tryon-Betts is the land owner, as is her uncle; Charles Tryon. Many homes on Tryon Street date back to this period, and in fact accommodate the furniture of this era, some of which (such as the Cherry Highboy) were produced by the cabinetmaker Isaac Tryon, circa 1772.
- Tryon Avenue in Norwalk, Connecticut, located parallel to East Avenue, the primary road traveled by Tryon’s forces as they burned the center of Norwalk.
- David Mathews, the former Mayor of New York City under the British and during Tryon's period of power in New York, named a son William Tryon Mathews after him.

Government offices
Preceded by Arthur Dobbs	Governor of North Carolina; 1764–1771	Succeeded by James Hasell; Acting
Preceded by Lord Dunmore	Governor of New York; 1771–1774	Succeeded by Cadwallader Colden; Acting
Preceded by Cadwallader Colden; Acting	Governor of New York; 1775–1777	Succeeded by James Robertson
Military offices
Preceded by Cyrus Trapaud	Commanding officer of the 70th Regiment of Foot; 1778–1783	Succeeded by The Earl of Suffolk
Preceded by William Evelyn	Commanding officer of the 29th Regiment of Foot; 1783–1788	Succeeded by The Earl of Harrington
