= Melissa Wake =

New Zealand paediatric academic

Melissa Wake FRACP FAHMS
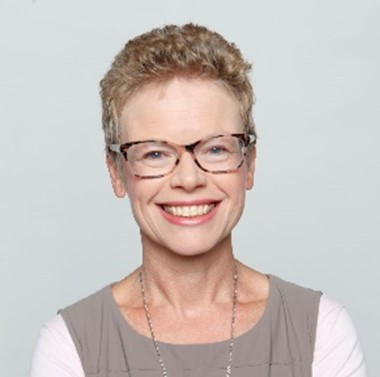
- Education: University of Melbourne; University of Glasgow; University of Auckland; University of Otago
- Scientific career
- Fields: Paediatrics, Community child health, epidemiology, longitudinal studies, population health, clinical trials
- Workplaces: Murdoch Children's Research Institute, University of Melbourne, University of Auckland

Melissa Anne Wake is a New Zealand paediatrician and scientific director of the Generation Victoria initiative, which states the aim of creating very large, parallel whole-of-state birth and parent cohorts in Victoria, Australia, for Open Science discovery and interventional research. She is group leader of the Murdoch Children's Research Institute's Prevention Innovation Research Group and holds professorial positions with the University of Melbourne and the University of Auckland (the Liggins Institute).

Her "population paediatrics" research spans common childhood conditions and antecedents of diseases of ageing. She leads the Longitudinal Study of Australian Children's biophysical repository (the Child Health CheckPoint) and has led or co-led 20 community-based randomised trials. A major focus is on building large-scale platforms to support faster, better observational and interventional children's research.

== Early life and education ==
Melissa Wake was born in Levin, New Zealand, the youngest of five children. After leaving Woodford House School for Girls in 1976, she graduated in medicine from the University of Otago in 1982, and entered clinical paediatrics in England before formal training in Auckland and Melbourne. Following her research doctorate (1999), she was Director of Research at Melbourne's Centre for Community Child Health and a consultant paediatrician at Melbourne Royal Children's Hospital. In 2017, she took up the Chair in Child Health Research at the University of Auckland, later returning to Melbourne to lead the foundational stages of Generation Victoria.

== Awards ==
- 2008, 2016 NHMRC "Ten of the Best" publication
- 2009 Australian Health Minister's Award for Excellence in Health and Medical Research
- 2012 National Health and Medical Research Council – Excellence Award – Highest-ranked Research Fellowship

== Selected publications ==
=== Randomised and quasi-experimental trials ===
- Hiscock, H.; Wake, M. (2002). "Randomised controlled trial of behavioural infant sleep intervention to improve infant sleep and maternal mood". BMJ (Clinical Research Ed.). 324 (7345): 1062–1065. doi:10.1136/bmj.324.7345.1062. PMC 104332. PMID 11991909.
- Wake, M.; Baur, L. A.; Gerner, B.; Gibbons, K.; Gold, L.; Gunn, J.; Levickis, P.; McCallum, Z.; Naughton, G.; Sanci, L.; Ukoumunne, O. C. (2009). "Outcomes and costs of primary care surveillance and intervention for overweight or obese children: the LEAP 2 randomised controlled trial". BMJ (Clinical Research Ed.). 339 b3308. doi:10.1136/bmj.b3308. PMC 2737607. PMID 19729418.
- Wake, M.; Tobin, S.; Girolametto, L.; Ukoumunne, O. C.; Gold, L.; Levickis, P.; Sheehan, J.; Goldfeld, S.; Reilly, S. (2011). "Outcomes of population based language promotion for slow to talk toddlers at ages 2 and 3 years: Let's Learn Language cluster randomised controlled trial". BMJ (Clinical Research Ed.). 343 d4741. BMJ. doi:10.1136/bmj.d4741. PMC 3191855. PMID 21852344.
- Wake, M.; Lycett, K.; Clifford, S. A.; Sabin, M. A.; Gunn, J.; Gibbons, K.; Hutton, C.; McCallum, Z.; Arnup, S. J.; Wittert, G. (2013). "Shared care obesity management in 3-10 year old children: 12 month outcomes of HopSCOTCH randomised trial". BMJ (Clinical Research Ed.). 346 f3092. BMJ. doi:10.1136/bmj.f3092. PMC 3677741. PMID 23751902.
- Sung, V.; Hiscock, H.; Tang, M. L.; Mensah, F. K.; Nation, M. L.; Satzke, C.; Heine, R. G.; Stock, A.; Barr, R. G.; Wake, M. (2014). "Treating infant colic with the probiotic Lactobacillus reuteri: Double blind, placebo controlled randomised trial". BMJ (Clinical Research Ed.). 348 g2107. BMJ Open. doi:10.1136/bmj.g2107. PMC 3972414. PMID 24690625.
- Wake, M.; Ching, T. Y.; Wirth, K.; Poulakis, Z.; Mensah, F. K.; Gold, L.; King, A.; Bryson, H. E.; Reilly, S.; Rickards, F. (2016). "Population Outcomes of Three Approaches to Detection of Congenital Hearing Loss". Pediatrics. 137 (1). doi:10.1542/peds.2015-1722. PMC 4702017. PMID 26704085.
- Roberts, G.; Quach, J.; Spencer-Smith, M.; Anderson, P. J.; Gathercole, S.; Gold, L.; Sia, K. L.; Mensah, F.; Rickards, F.; Ainley, J.; Wake, M. (2016). "Academic Outcomes 2 Years After Working Memory Training for Children With Low Working Memory: A Randomized Clinical Trial". JAMA Pediatrics. 170 (5): e154568. doi:10.1001/jamapediatrics.2015.4568. hdl:10536/DRO/DU:30082811. PMID 26954779.

=== Data resources and cohort research ===
- Wake, M.; Hesketh, K.; Lucas, J. (2000). "Teething and tooth eruption in infants: A cohort study". Pediatrics. 106 (6): 1374–1379. doi:10.1542/peds.106.6.1374. PMID 11099591.
- Williams, J.; Wake, M.; Hesketh, K.; Maher, E.; Waters, E. (2005). "Health-related quality of life of overweight and obese children". JAMA. 293 (1): 70–76. doi:10.1001/jama.293.1.70. hdl:10536/DRO/DU:30006497. PMID 15632338. S2CID 11614187.
- Clifford, S. A.; Davies, S.; Wake, M.; Child Health Checkpoint, Team (2019). "Child Health CheckPoint: Cohort summary of a physical health and biospecimen module for the Longitudinal Study of Australian Children". BMJ Open. 9 (Suppl 3): 3–22. doi:10.1136/bmjopen-2017-020261. PMC 6624028. PMID 31273012.
- Hu, Yanhong Jessika; Wake, Melissa; Saffery, Richard (2021). "Clarifying the Sweeping Consequences of COVID-19 in Pregnant Women, Newborns, and Children with Existing Cohorts". JAMA Pediatrics. 175 (2): 117–118. doi:10.1001/jamapediatrics.2020.2395. PMID 32797150. S2CID 221132808.
- Wake, M.; Goldfeld, S.; Davidson, A. (2022). "Embedding Life Course Interventions in Longitudinal Cohort Studies: Australia's GenV Opportunity". Pediatrics. 149 (Suppl 5). doi:10.1542/peds.2021-053509R. PMC 9847412. PMID 35503324.
