= William Wake (cricketer) =

English cricketer

William Robert Wake (21 May 1852 – 14 March 1896) was an English amateur first-class cricketer, who played three matches for Yorkshire County Cricket Club in 1881.

Born in Sheffield, Yorkshire, England, Wake was a right-handed batsman, who scored only thirteen first-class runs at 4.33, with a best score of 11. His right arm slow bowling was not called upon, although he did take two catches. The son of a solicitor, he played cricket as an amateur, and qualified as a solicitor himself. He played cricket for Pitsmoor C.C. and football for Sheffield F.C.

His uncle, Bernard Wake, played ten games for Yorkshire from 1849 to 1851, before the creation of 'first-class' cricket.

Wake died in March 1896 in Norwood, Sheffield, aged 43.
