= John Cheltenham Wake =

English painter (1834–1882)

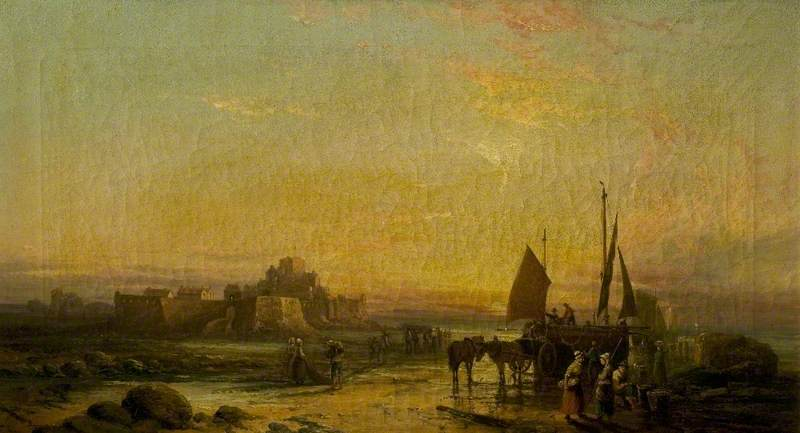
- Landing the Catch acquired for Leicester Arts and Museums Service & Leicester Museum & Art Gallery.
- Born: John Cheltenham Wake; 1837
- Died: 1882 (aged 44–45)
- Known for: Oil painting

John Cheltenham Wake (1834–1882) was an English oil painter who specialised in seascape and marine art.

== Biography ==
Parents:

John Wake (abt 1808-1868) married Sarah Cheltenham (1810-1863) on 24 Oct 1831 at St Martin in the Fields, Middlesex, England. They had seven children including John Cheltenham Wake.

John Wake was born in Bloomsbury in about 1808, son of John Wake. Sarah Cheltenham was born in Shaftesbury in 1810, daughter of John Cheltenham, victualler (of the Swan Inn, Shaftesbury), and Sarah Cheltenham nee Hunt.

John Cheltenham Wake:

Born 27 Sep 1834 and baptised on 19 Oct 1834 at St George Bloomsbury, Camden, Middlesex. Records show John, son of John and Sarah Wake, of Duke Street, father's occupation a coach trimmer.

1841 census: Age 6. With family at 38 Monmouth St, Finsbury, with father's occupation a coach trimmer.

1851 census: Age 16. With family at 7 Rose Square, Islington, Liverpool. John is listed as 16 years old, an apprentice gilder, born Middlesex. With parents (John 43, born Bloomsbury, London, coach trimmer, and Sarah 42 born Shrewsbury), siblings Ellen, Douglas and Alfred. NB Alfred was their only child to have a middle name of Cheltenham registered at birth.

Later censuses show the parents and rest of the family remaining in Liverpool.

1861 census: John Cm Wake, single, 25, lodger, Artist figure & marine painter. In the Dobell household in Erith, Kent. No addresses on this page, and no number for this household. Possibly Park Spring Terrace or Court or Place. First appearance in the records of the middle name Cheltenham. Wrong age. Should be 26.

Marriage of John Cheltenham Wake to Clara Reeves (1843-1922) on 5 Apr 1862 in Brentford, Middlesex.

Birth of son Herwald Andrew Wake in 1865, Dartford, Kent.; baptised on 22 Oct 1871 at Holy Trinity, Blackheath Hill, Greenwich, Kent. Baptism record states born 19 Aug 1865. Son of Cheltenham and Clara Wake. Father an artist. Of Thurston Rd, Lewisham.

1871 census: 47 Thurston Rd, Lewisham. Listed as John Wake, 34, landscape artist, with Clara Wake and son Herwald Wake. Wrong age. Should be 36.

Birth of son Cheltenham Wake Lewis (1872-8), Islington, Middlesex. Mother Elizabeth Lewis.

Birth of daughter Katherine Mary Wake Lewis (1875–1909), Kensington, Middlesex. Mother Elizabeth Lewis.

Birth of daughter Beatrice Betty Wake Lewis(1877–1958), Shepherds Bush, Middlesex. Mother Elizabeth Lewis.

Birth of son Cheltenham Wake Lewis(1880–1926), Shepherds Bush, Middlesex. Mother Elizabeth Lewis.

1881 census: 3 Caxton Rd, Hammersmith. John P Lewis [presumably John Cheltenham Wake], 42, head, married, draughtsman, born Middx, Elizabeth Lewis, 40, born Ash, Kent. Kate Lewis, 6, Beatrice Lewis 3, C. Lewis 4 months. Andrew Wake [transcribed Wales], 15, visitor, scholar, born New Cross, Kent. Wrong age. Should be 46.

Died 1882 age 45. Should be 47. Error in age probably due to informant error and/or ignorance of true age.

Died at 5 Caxton Rd on 18 May 1882. Probate on 5 Jan 1883, London office, stated late of 5 Caxton Rd, Shepherd's Bush and 74 Newman St, Oxford St, Middx. Will proved by Elizabeth Lewis spinster of 1 Lime Grove, Uxbridge Road, Middx. Sole executrix. NB There was no number 5 Caxton Rd in the 1881 census so is this a typo?

== Work ==
Leicester Arts and Museums Service owns a painting by Wake titled Landing the Catch. It is housed in The Leicester Museum & Art Gallery. The Public Catalogue Foundation digitised it as an oil painting in public ownership, in the UK's national collection.

Examples of Wake's paintings are the illustrated Landing the Catch and the work Fishermen in coastal waters at the end of the day.

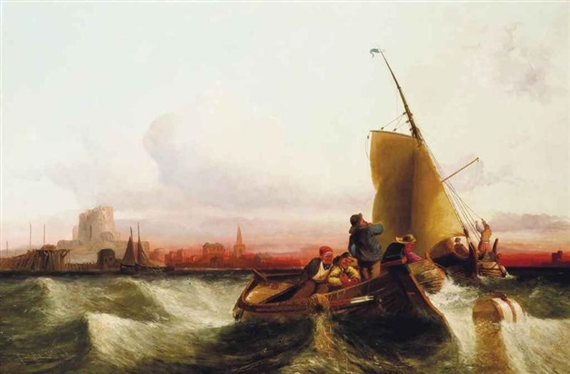
Fishermen in coastal waters at the end of the day by John Cheltenham Wake

== See also ==
- Public Catalogue Foundation
- BBC Your Paintings
- Leicester Museum & Art Gallery
