= Sir William Wake, 8th Baronet =

British politician

Sir William Wake, 8th Baronet (1742–1785), was a British politician who sat in the House of Commons from 1774 to 1784.

Wake was the son of Sir William Wake, 7th Baronet of Courteenhall and his wife Sarah Walker of Weston, Yorkshire. He was educated at Eton College in 1755 and admitted at Trinity College, Cambridge on 2 February 1760. On 6 March 1764, he was admitted at Lincoln's Inn. He married Mary Fenton, daughter of Richard Fenton of Banktop, Yorkshire on 6 June 1765 and succeeded his father in the baronetcy on 25 September 1765. He was High Sheriff of Northamptonshire in 1771–2.

In the 1774 general election Wake was elected as Member of Parliament for Bedford. He is reported as making only three speeches in that Parliament. He was re-elected for Bedford in 1780. He was described as "a very independent Member" with "a small mixture of tenaciousness, or perhaps obstinacy, in his disposition". He decided not to stand again in 1784 but was active in the election at Bedford.

Wake died on 29 October 1785. He was succeeded by his son William, who was married to Mary Sitwell (1771–1791), elder sister of Sir Sitwell Sitwell, 1st Baronet. They married in 1790 and had one son, Charles, but Mary died in childbirth.

In April 1793 he married Maria Jane Gambier, daughter of James Gambier, Admiral of the Red Squadron. They had 11 children.

Parliament of Great Britain
Preceded by Samuel Whitbread; Richard Vernon	Member of Parliament for Bedford; 1774–1784; With: Robert Sparrow 1774-1775; Samuel Whitbread 1775-1784	Succeeded by William MacDowall Colhoun; Samuel Whitbread
Baronetage of England
Preceded by William Wake	Baronet (of Clevedon); 1765-1785	Succeeded by William Wake
