= John Wake =

English cricketer

John Wake (born 13 February 1953) is an English former cricketer. He was a right-handed batsman and right-arm off-break bowler who played for Bedfordshire. He was born in Hexham, Northumberland. Attended Bothal CS School and Ashington GS and played cricket for Ashington CC & Northumberland U19's. Wake also represented Northumberland at Football whilst at school.

Wake, who played a single match for Glamorgan Second XI in 1977, played for Bedfordshire in the Minor Counties Championship between 1983 and 1992. Was captain for 4 years between 1989 and 1992 He made two List A appearances for the side, the first in 1985, in which he scored 37 runs, and took figures of 12-3-47-1 against Gloucestershire CCC and the second in 1991, in which he scored 4 runs against Worcestershire in the Nat West Trophy.

Wake continued to represent the side until the end of the 1992 Minor Counties Championship. Wake was Chairman of English Schools Cricket Association (ESCA)in 2005 and England U15 Team Manager for 4 years between 2006 and 2008, when future England players Joe Root, Ben Stokes, Jos Buttler, Joe Leach and Liam Livingstone were all selected by Wake.He toured South Africa as Team Manager with England U16 in 2006.

He was Master I/C Cricket at Oundle School for 24 years between 1992 and 2015.

Graeme Swann (Northants/Notts & England) picked Wake as one his top ten best all-time spinners. Swann attributes to Wake his attacking mindset and fielding strategies employed as his mentor.
