= Margaret Wake Tryon =

English heiress and wife of William Tryon

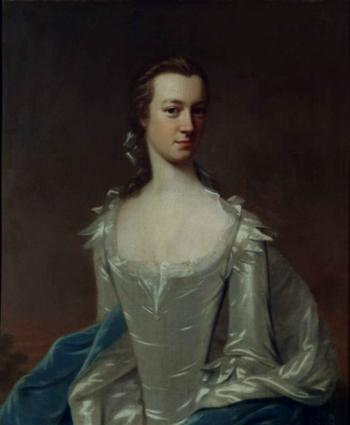
- Born: Margaret Wake c. 1732; London, England
- Died: 16 February 1819; Yarmouth, Isle of Wight, England
- Spouse: William Tryon (m. 1757)
- Children: 2
- Parents: William Wake; Elizabeth Elwin

Margaret Wake Tryon (c.1732 – 1819) was an English heiress and the wife of William Tryon, who served as the Colonial Governor of North Carolina and the Colonial Governor of New York. The eponym of Wake County in North Carolina, she is one of three women, along with Charlotte of Mecklenburg-Strelitz and Virginia Dare, to have a North Carolinian county named after her. She was known for her interest in military strategy, which was controversial for upper-class women of her time.

== Biography ==
Margaret Wake was born in London to a genteel family. Her father, William Wake, served as the East India Company's Governor of Bombay from 1742 to 1750. Her mother, Elizabeth Elwin Wake of Thurning Hall, was from a prominent Norfolk family. She lived with her family at a house in Hanover Square, Westminster prior to her marriage.

On 26 December 1757 she married William Tryon of Norbury Park, a captain in the 1st Regiment of Foot Guards and a grandson of Robert Shirley, 1st Earl Ferrers, at St. George's Church. An heiress, she married with a dowry of £30,000. She lived with Tryon in a house on Upper Grosvenor Street. They had two children; a daughter, Margaret, and a son who died in infancy. A year after their wedding her husband was promoted to lieutenant colonel. In 1764 Wake moved with her husband to the Province of North Carolina, where he served as lieutenant governor. They lived at Russelborough House on the Cape Fear River near Wilmington. During this time they went on a tour of the colony and were received as guests of honor at a ball for the gentry in New Bern. In 1765 her husband was appointed Governor of North Carolina by George III. In 1770 they moved into Tryon Palace in New Bern, which they had built as the official residence for the Governor of North Carolina. They left New Bern in 1771, when her husband was appointed the Colonial Governor of New York.

In 1770 colonial planter and general assemblyman Joel Lane named Wake County in honor of Margaret Wake.

Wake was described as an "accomplished" and "learned" woman who had a talent for playing the organ and spinet. She was known to avoid women's company and preferred to engage in men's conversation, particularly on the topics of government and military fortifications, which was considered unconventional at the time. She was also interested in military strategy and religion, and kept a large library at Tryon Palace. Wake reportedly insisted on being addressed as Your Excellency, her husband's form of address.

She returned to England with her family during the American Revolution. When her husband died in 1788, he left the bulk of his estate to her and her heirs.

Her daughter, Margaret (born c. 1761), perished in a fall while climbing out a window to elope with a soldier in 1791.

Wake died on 16 February 1819 in Yarmouth. In her last will and testament, she bequeathed fifty pounds to Penelope Pennington, and left her property on Sloan Street in Chelsea to Penelope and William Pennington, which at that time was being rented by Lady Skipwith.

== In popular culture ==
Wake appears in Julia Quinn's 2017 romance novel The Girl With the Make-Believe Husband.

Wake is portrayed by Melanie Gray in the fourth and fifth seasons of the British television series Outlander.
