= William Wake (governor) =

English Governor of Bombay

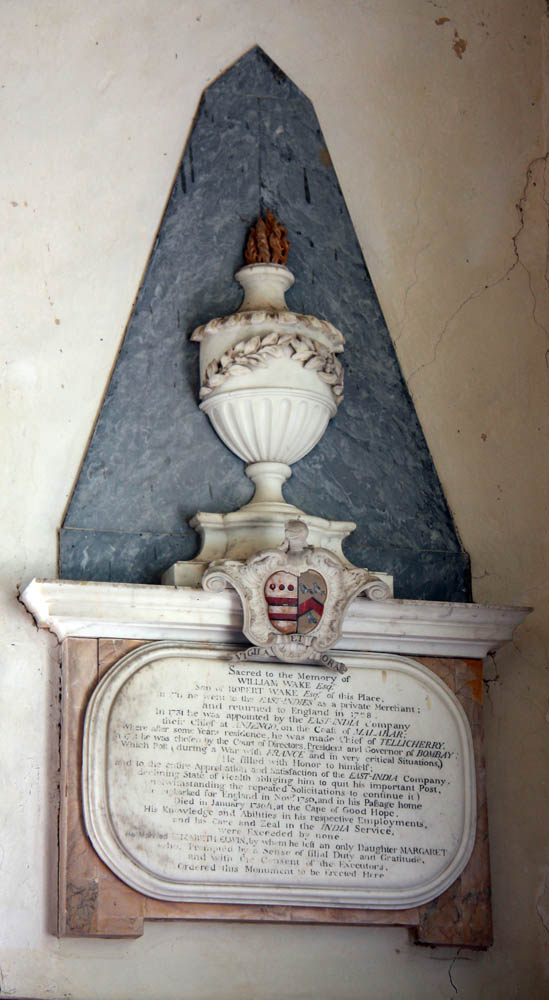
- Monument to William Wake in St Andrew's Church in Thurning, Norfolk

Governor of Bombay
- In office 26. November 1742 – 17 November 1750
- Preceded by: John Geekie
- Succeeded by: Richard Bourchier

Personal details
- Died: 1750 South Africa
- Spouse: Elizabeth Elwin
- Children: Margaret Wake Tryon

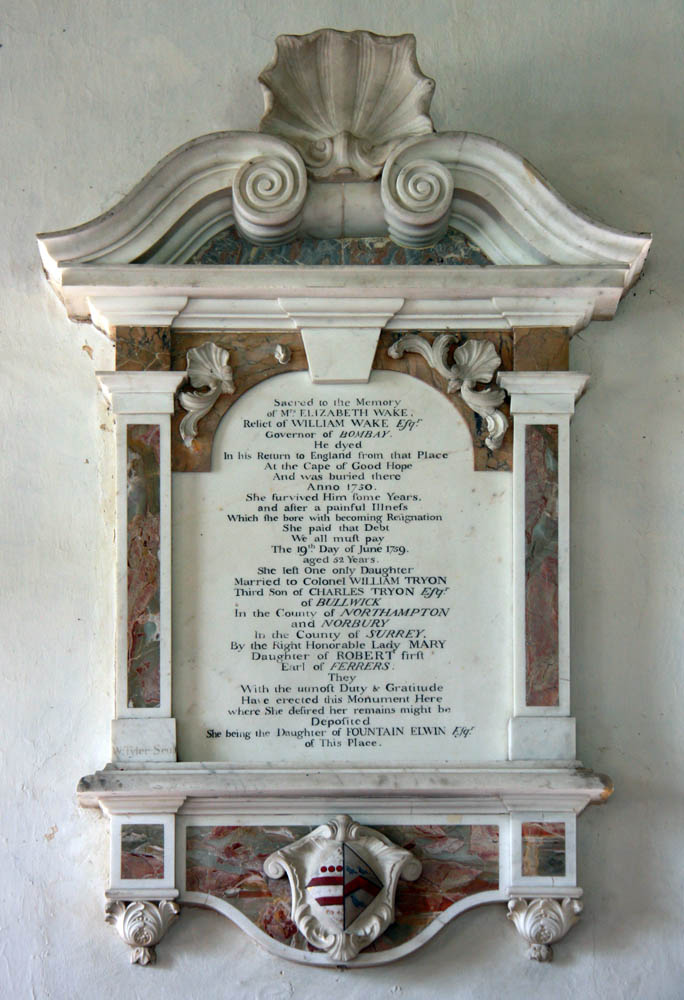
Monument to Elizabeth Elwin, wife of William Wake, St Andrew's Church Thurning, Norfolk

William Wake (died 1750) was Governor of Bombay for the English East India Company from 26 November 1742 to 17 November 1750.

He married Elizabeth Elwin (d.1759), a daughter of Fountain Elwin of Thurning, Norfolk, where she is buried. Two mural monuments, one to Wake the other to his wife, survive in St Andrew's Church, Thurning. He had issue an only daughter:

- Margaret Wake (c.1732-1819), wife of Col. William Tryon (1729-1788), Governor of the Province of North Carolina (1765–1771) and of the Province of New York (1771–1780).

Wake died in 1750 in South Africa during his return voyage to England.

Political offices
Preceded by John Geekie	Governor of Bombay; 1742–1750	Succeeded by Richard Bourchier
