= Courteenhall =

Village in Northamptonshire, England

Coordinates: 52.171°N 0.891°W

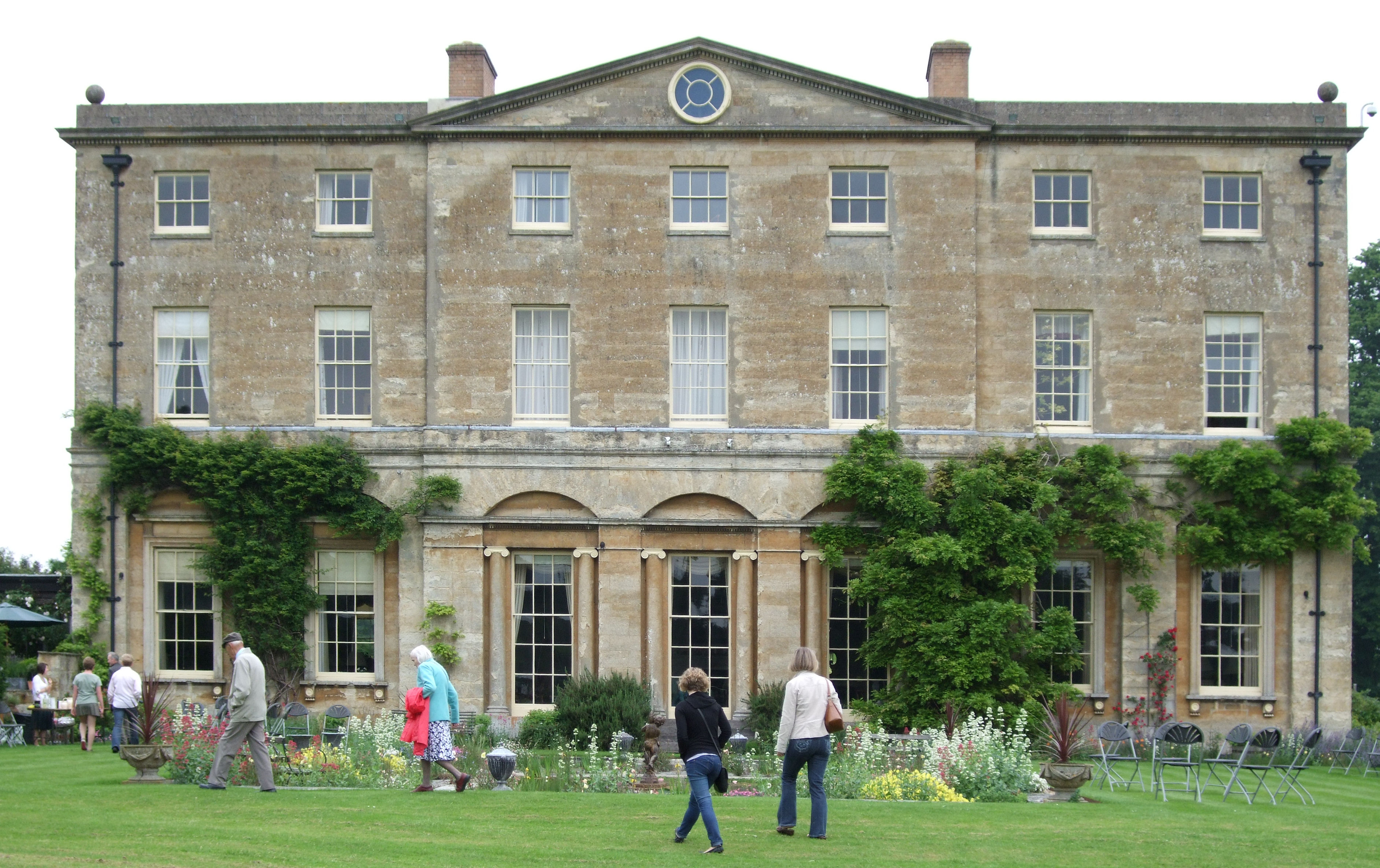
- Courteenhall House pictured during the biennial Fête, Saturday 7 June 2008

- Location within Northamptonshire
- Population: 95 (2010 est); 122 (2011 census)
- OS grid reference: SP760530
  - London: 65 miles (105 km)
- Civil parish: Courteenhall (Annual Meeting) Roade (Administration)
- Unitary authority: West Northamptonshire
- Ceremonial county: Northamptonshire
- Region: East Midlands
- Country: England
- Sovereign state: United Kingdom
- Post town: NORTHAMPTON
- Postcode district: NN7
- Dialling code: 01604
- Police: Northamptonshire
- Fire: Northamptonshire
- Ambulance: East Midlands
- UK Parliament: South Northamptonshire

Courteenhall is a village 5 miles (8 km) south of the county town of Northampton, in the ceremonial county of Northamptonshire, England, and about 66 miles (106 km) north of London. The population of the civil parish was 122 at the 2011 census. The village is located in a cul-de-sac.

== Governance ==
The village is in West Northamptonshire, and is part of Towcester and Roade ward. Since the 2010 general election it has been in the parliamentary constituency of South Northamptonshire (previously Northampton South).

== Location ==
The M1 motorway between junctions 14 and 15 passes to the northeast of the village, and junction 15 is just 1 mile distant. The main part of the village is on a no-through route. Courteenhall Parish has its own independent Parish Meeting which usually meets twice a year. It shares a rector with Roade, Ashton, Collingtree and Hartwell.

== Facilities ==
The parish had a population of less than 100 in 2003, has no facilities other than a church and relies on the nearby village of Roade for shops, schools and other services. The post office in Courteenhall, which opened in 1883, closed in February 1996.

== History ==
The villages name origin is uncertain. 'Corta's/Curta's nook of land' or 'nook of the enclosed piece of land'.

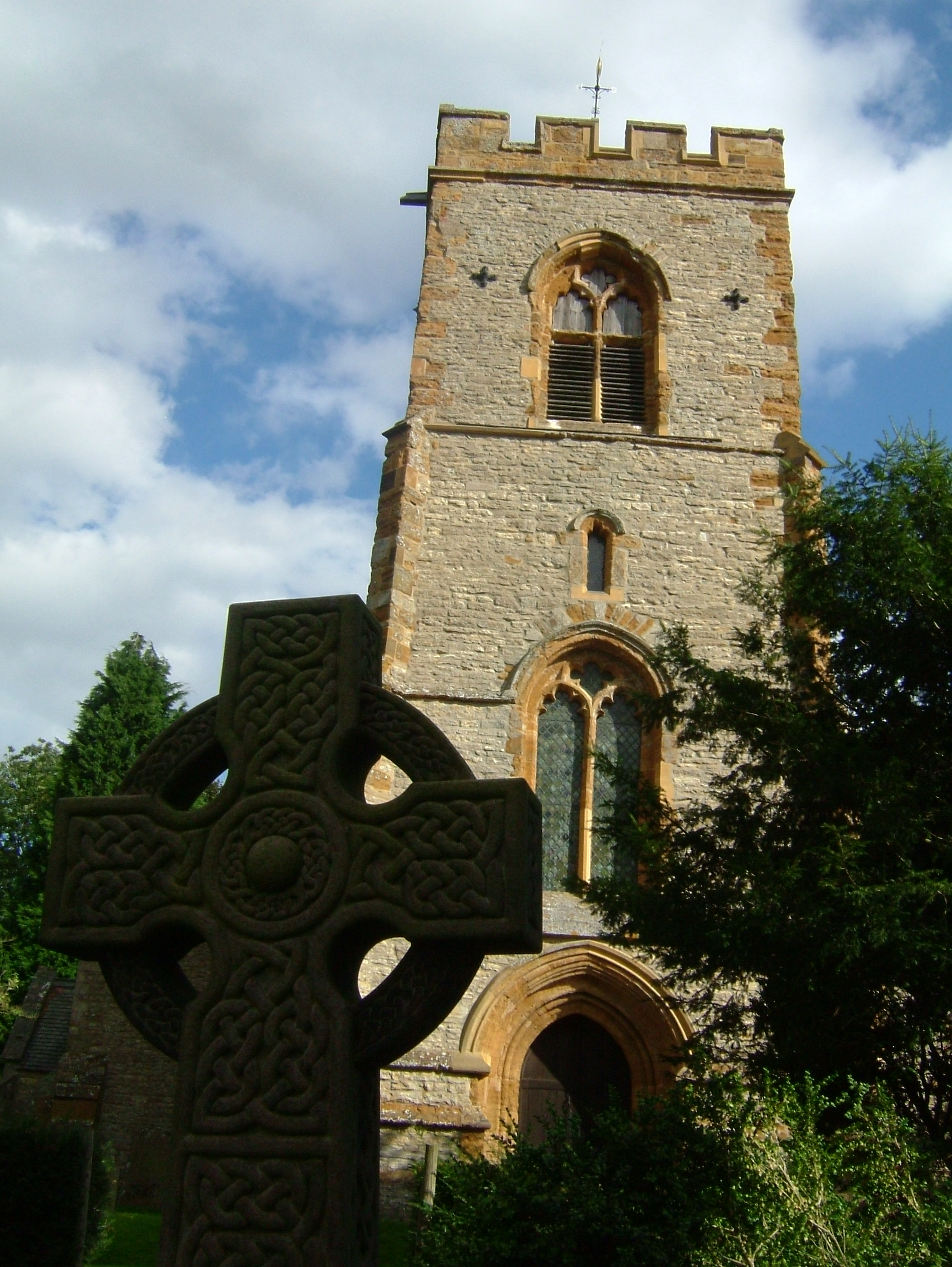
The church of St Peter and St Paul

=== Church of St Peter and St Paul ===
The church dates from the 12th century. It is now part of "The Five Parishes" group of local churches together with Roade, Collingtree, Ashton and Hartwell. The former Rectory is next to the south side of the church. The church has some memorable tombs. The 1851 ecclesiastical census revealed that 100 people, out of a total population of 127, attended Courteenhall Church on census day. The Rectory next to the church dates from 1805.

=== The Hall ===
The village has developed around the Courteenhall House estate. The landscaped park covers about 370 acres (150 ha), with formal gardens close to the house. The estate was purchased from Richard Ouseley by Samuel Jones, the son of a London merchant, in 1647. Samuel was knighted in 1660, was High Sheriff of Northamptonshire for 1652–53 and died in 1673. His estates were inherited by his great-nephew Samuel Wake, a younger son of Sir William Wake, 3rd Baronet of Piddington. The Wake family is reputedly descended from Hereward the Wake, a Saxon hero of resistance to the Norman Conquest of England. The park was designed in 1791 by Humphry Repton sic for Sir William Wake, 9th Baronet. The Hall, like the park, dates from 1791 on a site selected by Repton and is by a little-known architect Samuel Saxon. It is private property but may be viewed in the distance from Courteenhall village church. Although sheep graze over the grounds of the main park, they are kept out of the Hall's garden by a ha-ha. Courteenhall House is still occupied by the Wake family, the head of which being Sir Hereward Charles Wake, 15th Baronet.

=== The Stables and School House ===
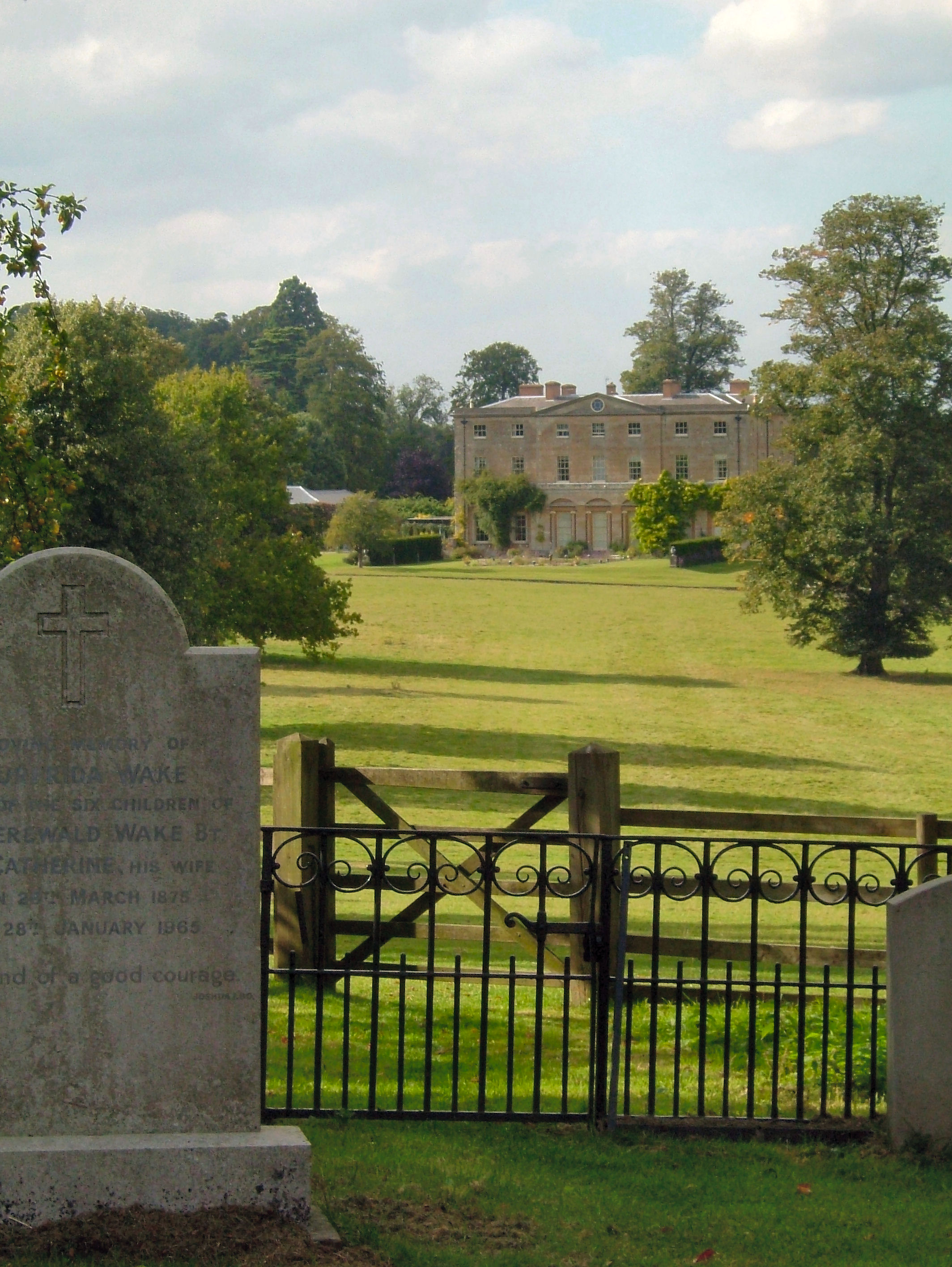
The hall from the church

Built around 1750 in the Palladian style and contrast with the house. There is also in the grounds the former Free Grammar School House of about 1680, under the will of Sir Samuel Jones containing its original school furnishings including a raised seat for the school master.

== Visitors ==
The venue is rarely open to the public but is available for private hire. It is at the end of a narrow cul-de-sac road and has very limited parking. Visitors are advised to park outside the village and use one of the many public footpaths for access. Parking during the fête is via the main drive from the A508 Northampton to Milton Keynes road only.

== Biennial fête ==
A large biennial fête is held during June in even-numbered years, which is an opportunity to see the house (exterior only), and grounds including an extensive arboretum. The event raises several thousand pounds for the upkeep of the church, parts of which are over 800 years old.

== Notable people ==
- Sir Richard Lane (1584–1650) Chief Baron of the Exchequer and Lord Keeper of the Great Seal to Charles I
- Joan Wake (1884–1974), historian
