= Joan Wake =

English Historian

Joan Wake CBE (29 February 1884 – 15 January 1974) was an English historian and archival activist, with a particular interest in the history and records of her native Northamptonshire. She led a successful campaign to save Delapré Abbey from destruction.

== Background ==
Joan Wake was born at Courteenhall, a daughter of Sir Hereward Wake, 12th baronet, and his wife, Catherine St Aubyn, daughter of Sir Edward St Aubyn, 1st Baronet and sister of John St Aubyn, 1st Baron St Levan.

== Historian and activist ==
Whilst studying at the London School of Economics and Political Science, she developed contacts with the historians Eileen Power, Frank Stenton and Doris Mary Stenton. Her own earliest major historical project was the full transcription of hundreds of medieval charters in the Hesketh Collection at Easton Neston.

In 1918, she became a Fellow of the Royal Historical Society, and two years later was one of the founders of the Northamptonshire Record Society. Her activities during the rest of her life focused on promoting the preservation, safe custody and publication of the records of Northamptonshire. She was also active in the British Records Association, founded in 1932.

As well as the research and writing activities usually associated with historians, she was an activist who visited 36 solicitors' firms during the Second World War to ensure that archives in their care were not destroyed as part of the wartime paper salvage campaign.

By the 1950s, Delapré Abbey, a short distance south of the centre of Northampton, was owned by Northampton Corporation, disused and under threat of demolition. Through successful fundraising and political pressure, Joan Wake and the Record Society brought about a change of policy so that the building was saved; in 1959 it was officially opened as the Northamptonshire Record Office with accommodation for the Record Society's library. In the following year, she was made a C.B.E. in recognition of her achievements.

== Publications ==
Between 1911 and 1973, a total of over 80 works by Joan Wake were published, the majority of which related to various aspects of the history of Northamptonshire.

As General Editor of the volumes of historical texts published by the Northamptonshire Record Society from 1924 to 1964, she composed prefaces or indexes to eight volumes.

== Death and burial ==
Wake died in 1974 in a Northampton nursing home and is buried at Courteenhall church.
