= John Wake (MP) =

John Wake (fl. 1388), was an English Member of Parliament (MP).

He was a Member of the Parliament of England for Weymouth in February 1388.
