= Wake baronets =

Title in the Baronetage of England

Arms of Wake: Or, two bars gules in chief three torteaux

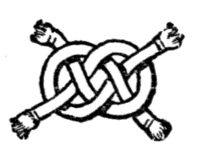
Crest of Wake: The Wake knot The Wake knot has the form of a carrick bend

The Wake Baronetcy, of Clevedon in the County of Somerset, is a title in the Baronetage of England. It was created on 5 December 1621 for Baldwin Wake. The sixth Baronet assumed the additional surname of Jones but died childless. The eighth Baronet sat as Member of Parliament for Bedford. The twelfth Baronet was High Sheriff of Northamptonshire in 1879. The thirteenth Baronet was a Major-General in the British Army. Another member of the family to gain distinction was Charles Wake, second son of the tenth Baronet; he was an Admiral in the Royal Navy.

Joan Wake (1884–1974), the noted Northamptonshire historian, was a daughter of the 12th Baronet.

Legend states this family to be descended from the Anglo-Saxon nobleman Hereward the Wake (died c.1072). This legend has been examined by various genealogists, unfavourably by Horace Round but favourably by Sir Iain Moncreiffe, who provided grounds for considering it to be accurate. The Wake family of Lincolnshire claimed descent from Hereward's daughter Turfrida (by his second wife Alftruda) who married Hugh d'Envermeu, founder of Wilsford Priory in Lincolnshire, by whom she was the mother of Godiva d'Envermeu, who married Richard de Rullos. From this point the pedigree is proven: Adeline de Rullos (daughter of Richard de Rullos and his wife Godiva d'Envermeu) married Baldwin FitzGilbert and left an eldest daughter and co-heiress Emma de Rullos, wife of Hugh Wac, feudal baron of Bourne in Lincolnshire.

Since the accession of the twelfth Baronet in 1865, each holder of the title has borne the first-name Hereward. The family seat is Courteenhall House in Northamptonshire.

== Wake baronets (1621) ==
- Sir Baldwin Wake, 1st Baronet (1574–1627)
- Sir John Wake, 2nd Baronet (1602–1658)
- Sir William Wake, 3rd Baronet (1632–1698)
- Sir John Wake, 4th Baronet (1661–1714) who was succeeded by his brother:
- Sir Baldwin Wake, 5th Baronet (1696–1747) who was succeeded by his grandson:
- Sir Charles Wake-Jones, 6th Baronet (1725–1755) who was succeeded by the third son of his great-uncle (Rev. Robert Wake, 1666–1725):
- Sir William Wake, 7th Baronet (1715–1765)
- Sir William Wake, 8th Baronet (1742–1785)
- Sir William Wake, 9th Baronet (1768–1846)
- Sir Charles Wake, 10th Baronet (1791–1864)
- Sir William Wake, 11th Baronet (1823–1865)
- Sir Hereward Wake, 12th Baronet (1852–1916)
- Sir Hereward Wake, 13th Baronet (1876–1963), an officer on the staff of the British Expeditionary Force in 1914 with the rank of major, later rising to the rank of major general
- Sir Hereward Wake, 14th Baronet (1916–2017)
- Sir Hereward Charles Wake, 15th Baronet (born 1952), who was married to Lady Doune Mabell Ogilvy, eldest daughter of the 13th Earl of Airlie.

The heir apparent to the baronetcy is the current holder's eldest son, John Hereward Wake (born 1978).
