= Great Western Building =

Building in Mumbai, Maharashtra, India

Coordinates: 18.928686°N 72.833739°E

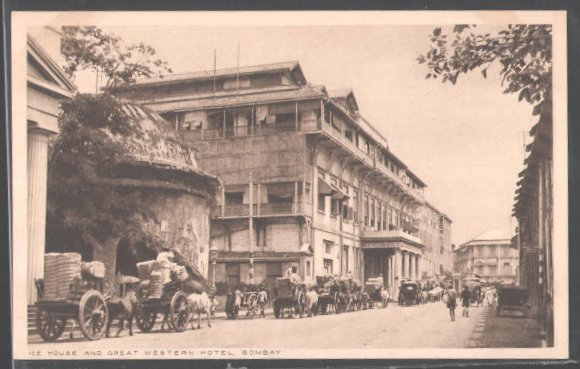
The Great Western Building in 1890 when it served as a hotel.

The Great Western Building is a building in Mumbai, the capital of Maharashtra, India.

The building was used for residence of the Governor of Bombay. William Hornby, a former governor who was instrumental in initiating the Hornby Vellard project which bunded the breach at Mahalaxmi, lived here for a few years of his term in office. It was the residence of the Admiral between 1764 and 1792

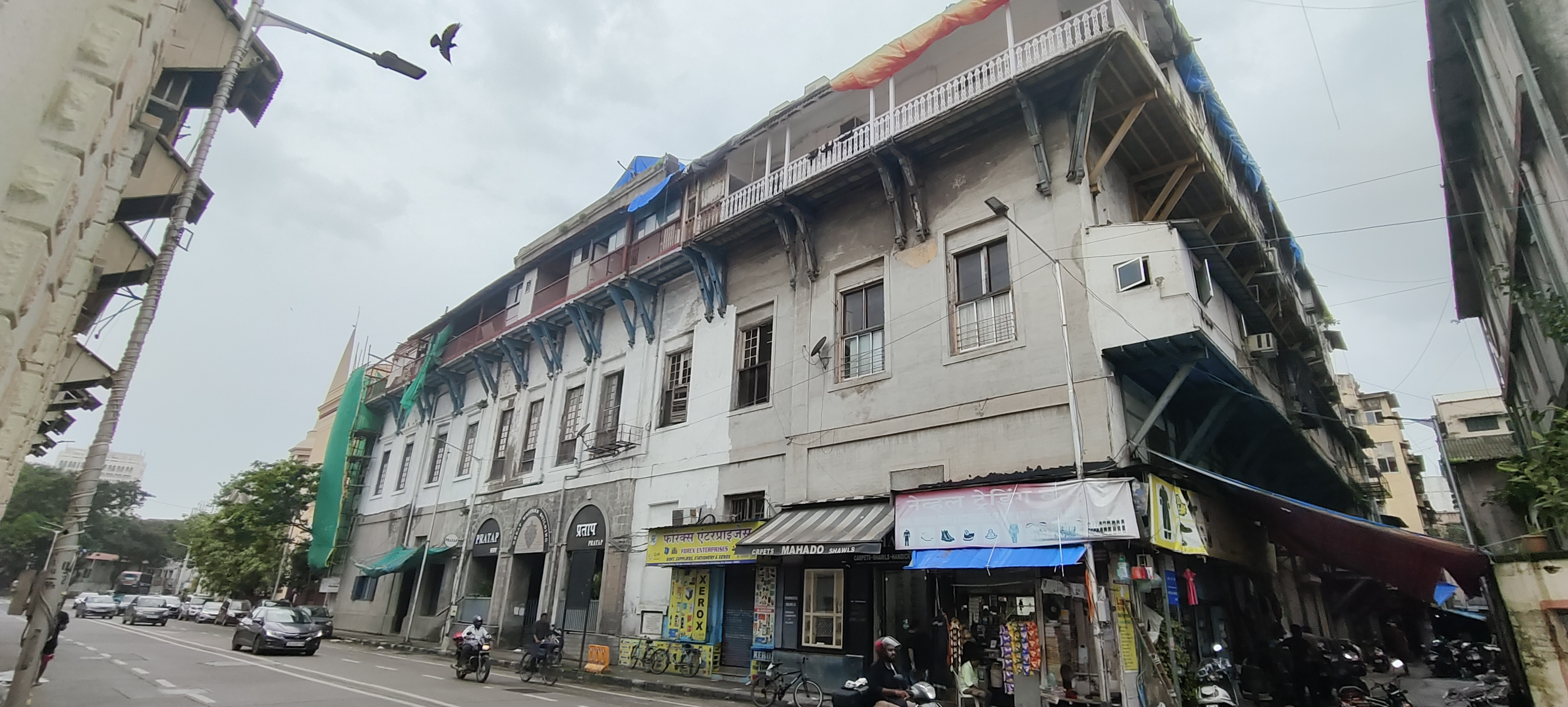
A view of the Great Western Building, Mumbai

Lachlan Macquarie, who was later the Governor of New South Wales (1810-1821), lived at Admiralty House. Around 1800, it was purchased by the Government and transformed into the chief court of Bombay known as Supreme Court of Bombay. From 1899, it started functioning as Bombay High Court. In 1883, it was sold again and converted into a hotel known as the Great Western Hotel. Later a new five-storied wing was added in the early 1890s by renowned architect S. M. N. Chandabhoy. In time, the hotel closed, and the rooms have been divided and further subdivided for optimum rental.

== History ==
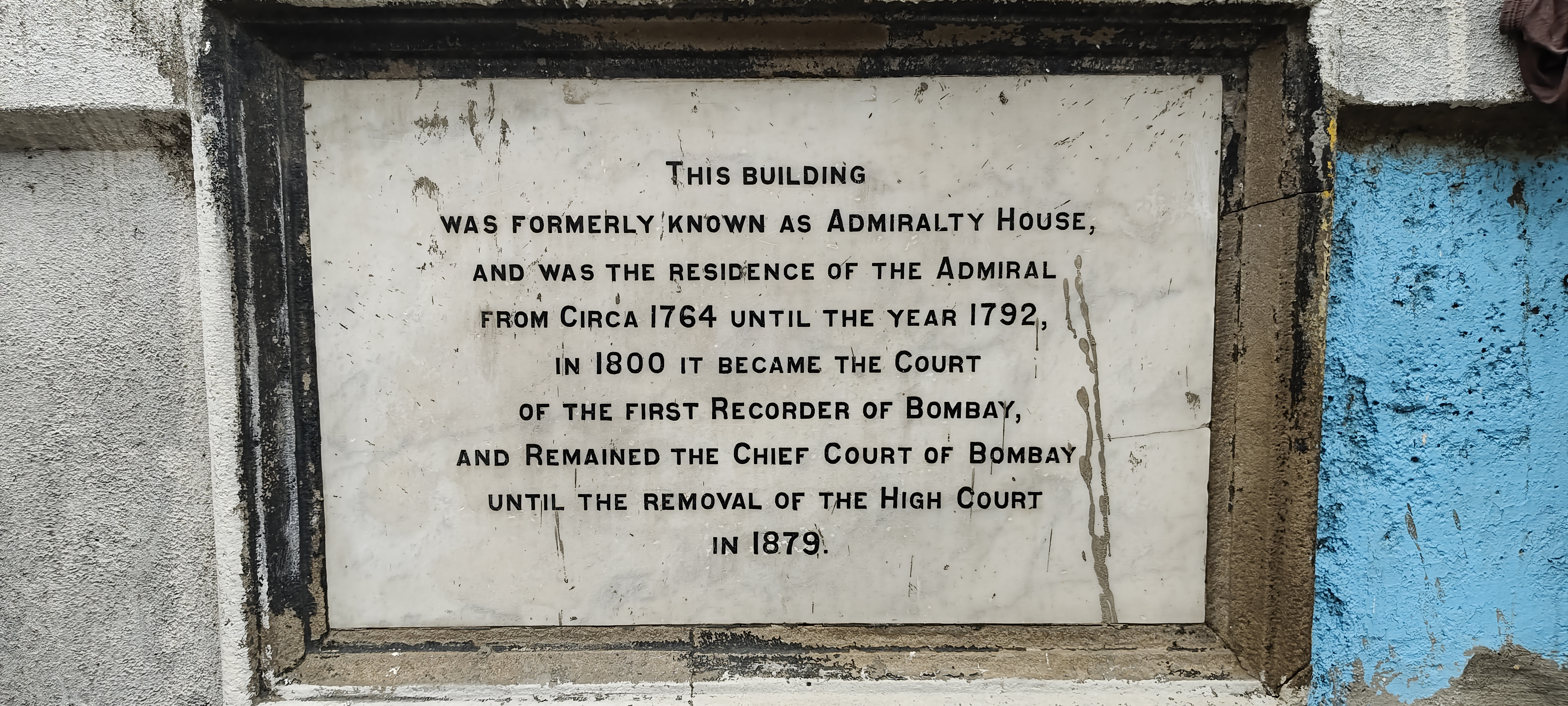
A plaque at the building, mentioning significant events in the history of the building.

Great Western Building was originally constructed as a palatial residence for Governor William Hornby whose Hornby Vellard project reclaimed the Bombay isthmus.It also served as the Admiralty House, residence of the Commander-in-chief of the Indian Fleet from 1770–1795. It was the residence of the Admiral between 1764 and 1792. Around 1800, the colonial government acquired the site and converted it into the Recorder's Court, the predecessor of the Supreme Court of Bombay. The court operated here until its relocation to today's Bombay High Court building in 1879.

In 1883, the original porch was removed when the street was widened. The property was purchased by Rustomjee Jeejeebhoy and then sold to the Sassoon family, the private investors who established the Great Western Hotel. A major five‑storey wing designed by architect S. M. N. Chandabhoy was added in the early 1890s to accommodate British dignitaries and long‑stay guests. The hotel ceased operations in the mid‑20th century, and its rooms were gradually subdivided to maximize rental yield.

== Architecture ==
The original 1764 core is built of local buff-colored stone with a broad ground‑floor veranda supported on Doric columns, reflecting early neoclassical tastes filtered through colonial practice. Large shuttered windows and high ceilings provided passive cooling in Mumbai's tropical climate. The 1890s Chandabhoy annex introduced red brick and stucco ornamentation, sash windows, and a pressed‑metal cornice, melding Victorian stylistic elements with the building's classical base. A central grand staircase once led to the Recorder's Court chambers; although the original porch was removed during 19th‑century street widening, much of the internal joinery and marble flooring survive in the ground‑floor lobby.
