= List of governors of the Bombay Presidency =

Until the 18th century, Bombay consisted of seven islands separated by shallow sea. These seven islands were part of a larger archipelago in the Arabian sea, off the western coast of India. The date of city's founding is unclear—historians trace back urban settlement to the late 17th century after the British secured the seven islands from the Portuguese to establish a secure base in the region. The islands provided the British with a sheltered harbour for trade, in addition to a relatively sequestered location that reduced the chances of land-based attacks. Over the next two centuries, the British dominated the region, first securing the archipelago from the Portuguese, and later defeating the Marathas to secure the hinterland.

Bombay Presidency was one of the three Presidencies of British India; the other two being Madras Presidency, and Bengal Presidency. It was in the centre-west of the Indian subcontinent on the Arabian Sea. It was bordered to the north-west, north, and north-east by Baluchistan province, Punjab province, and Rajputana Agency; to the east by Central India Agency, the Central Provinces and Berar and Hyderabad State; and to the south by Madras Presidency and Mysore State. The Presidency was established in the late 17th century and named after Bombay, the capital city and the island on which it was built. By 1906, the area under the jurisdiction of Bombay Presidency stretched from North Canara in the south to Sindh in the north, encompassing the now-Pakistani province of Sindh, some parts of the present-day state of Gujarat, northwestern part of Karnataka state, the British Aden protectorate in Yemen, and the western two-thirds of modern-day Maharashtra.

During British rule, a Governor was the chief administrative and political officer of Bombay. The executive Government of the Presidency was administered by the Governor. He had the same power and right in the Presidency as the Governor-General of India, and observed the same order and course in their proceedings. Governors of Bombay and Madras Presidencies, who were appointed by the East India Company before 1858 and the British Crown subsequently, were the most important officials after the Viceroy. Bombay Castle was the official residence of the governor of Bombay until the 1770s, when it was moved to Parel; a century later, in 1883, it was moved to Malabar Hill.

Abraham Shipman was appointed the first Royal Governor of Bombay in 1662. Beginning in 1668, Charles II leased the islands to the East India Company—George Oxenden was appointed the first Company Governor of Bombay on 23 September 1668. In 1687, the Company relocated its headquarters from Surat to Bombay. In 1858, the British Crown took formal repossession of the territory after the company was disbanded. After India's independence in 1947, the territory was restructured into Bombay State. The area of Bombay State increased, after several erstwhile princely states that acceded to the Indian union were integrated into Bombay State. Raja Maharaj Singh was the first Indian Governor of Bombay after independence. On 1 May 1960, Bombay State was restructured on linguistic lines—Gujarati-speaking areas were partitioned into the state of Gujarat, and Marathi-speaking areas of Bombay State, Central Provinces and Berar, and Hyderabad State were integrated as the state of Maharashtra. The last person to hold the title of "Governor of Bombay" was Sri Prakasa in 1960.

== Royal governors (1662–1668) ==
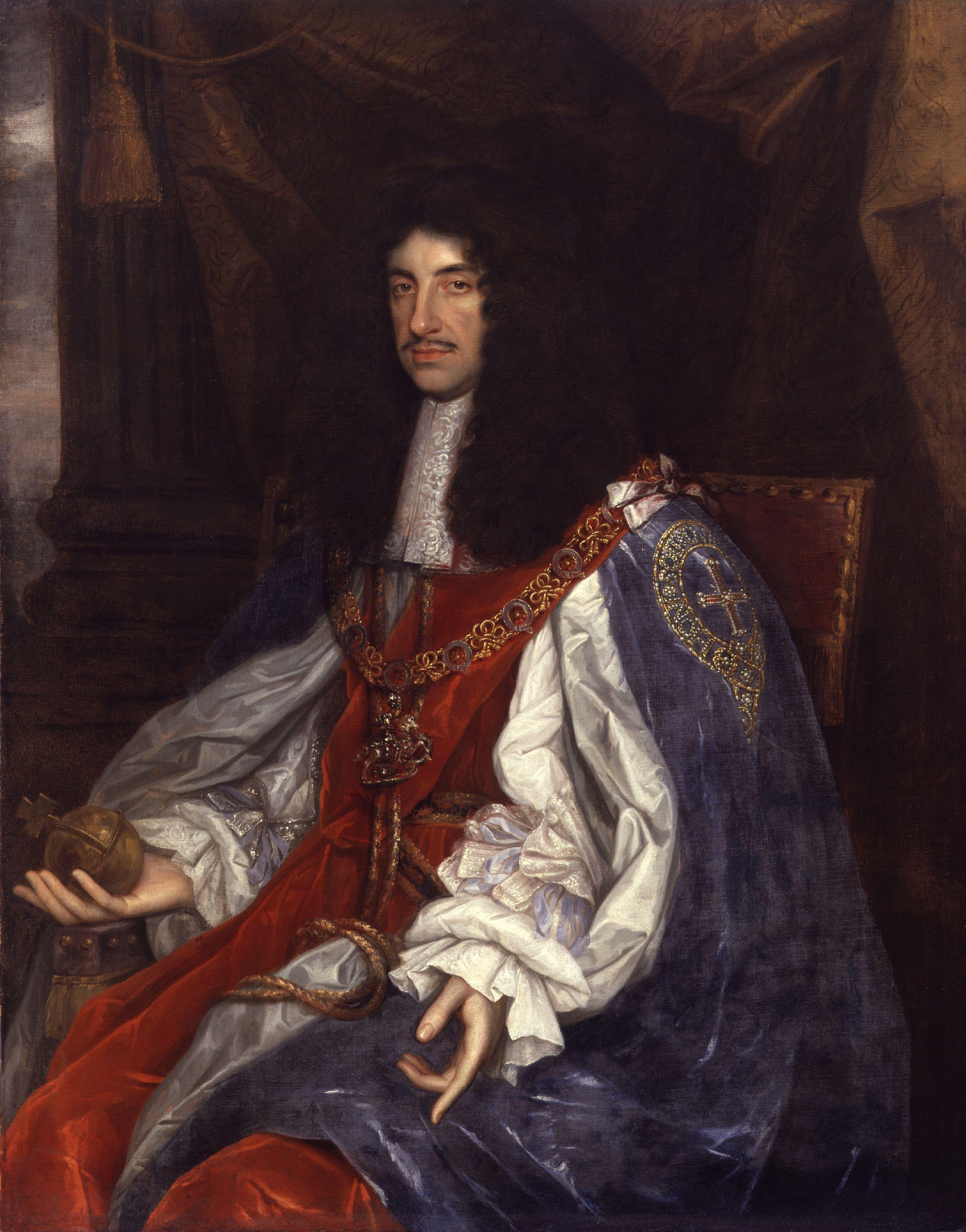
Charles II of England, who received Bombay as part of his dowry

The marriage treaty of Charles II of England and Catherine of Braganza that concluded on 8 May 1661 incorporated Bombay into the English colonial empire- the territory was part of Catherine's dowry. On 19 March 1662, Abraham Shipman was appointed the first Governor and General of the city, and his fleet arrived in Bombay in September and October 1662. On being asked to hand over Bombay and Salsette to the English, the Portuguese governor contended that the Bombay Island alone had been ceded, and alleging irregularity in the patent, he refused to give up even Bombay Island. The Portuguese Viceroy declined to interfere and Shipman was prevented from landing in Bombay. He was forced to retire to the island of Anjediva in North Canara and died there in October 1664. In November 1664, Shipman's successor Humphrey Cooke agreed to accept Bombay Island without its dependencies. The first four governors held Bombay for the Crown.

No.	Name	Assumed office	Left office	Years in office	Remarks^{[a]}
1	Abraham Shipman	19 March 1662	October 1664	2	
2	Humphrey Cooke	February 1665	5 November 1666	1	Acting
3	Gervase Lucas	5 November 1666	21 May 1667	1	
4	Henry Gary	22 May 1667	23 September 1668	1	Acting

Sources: The India List and India Office List and Origin of Bombay

== Company governors (1668–1862) ==
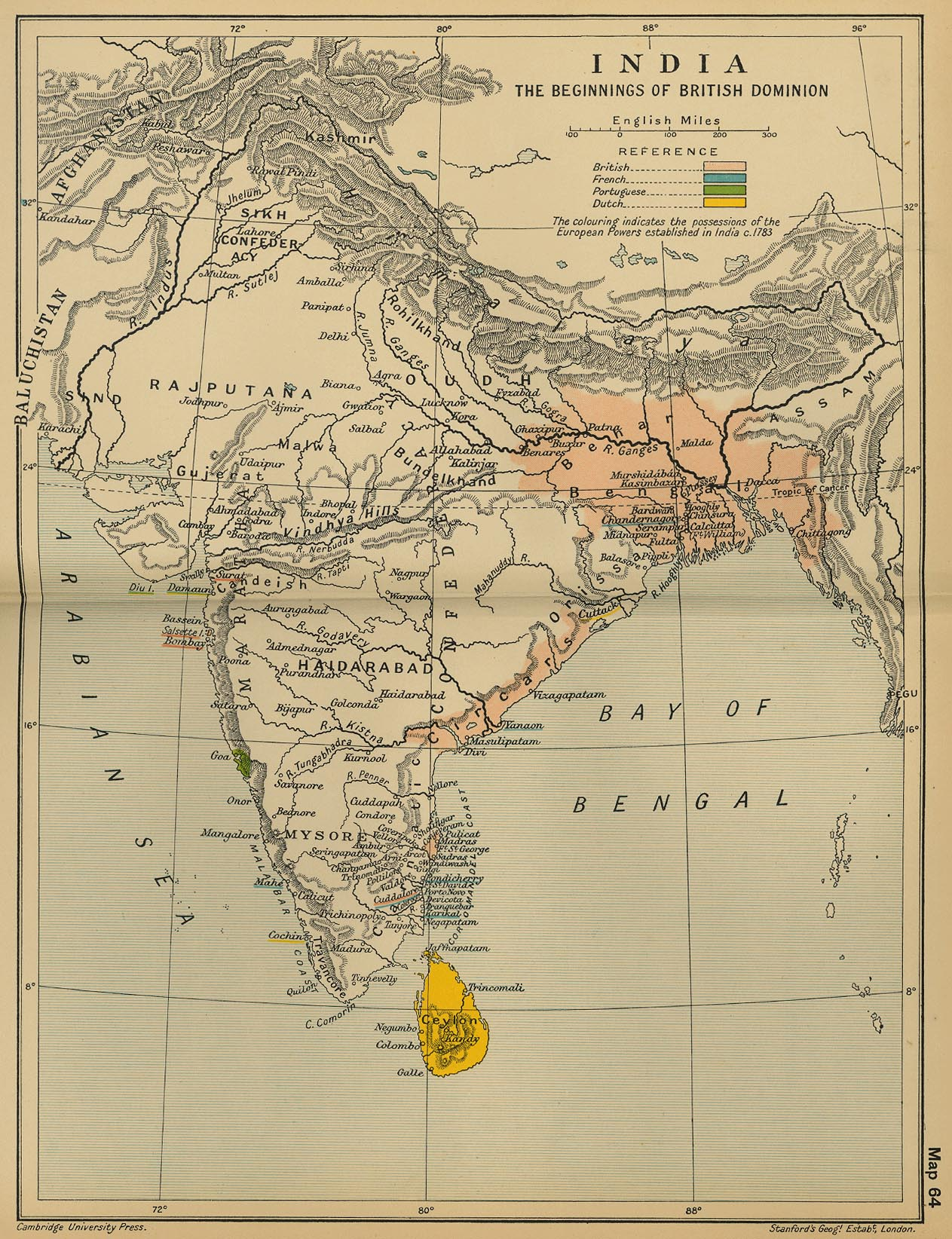
Map of India showing Bombay as a British possession (c. 1783)

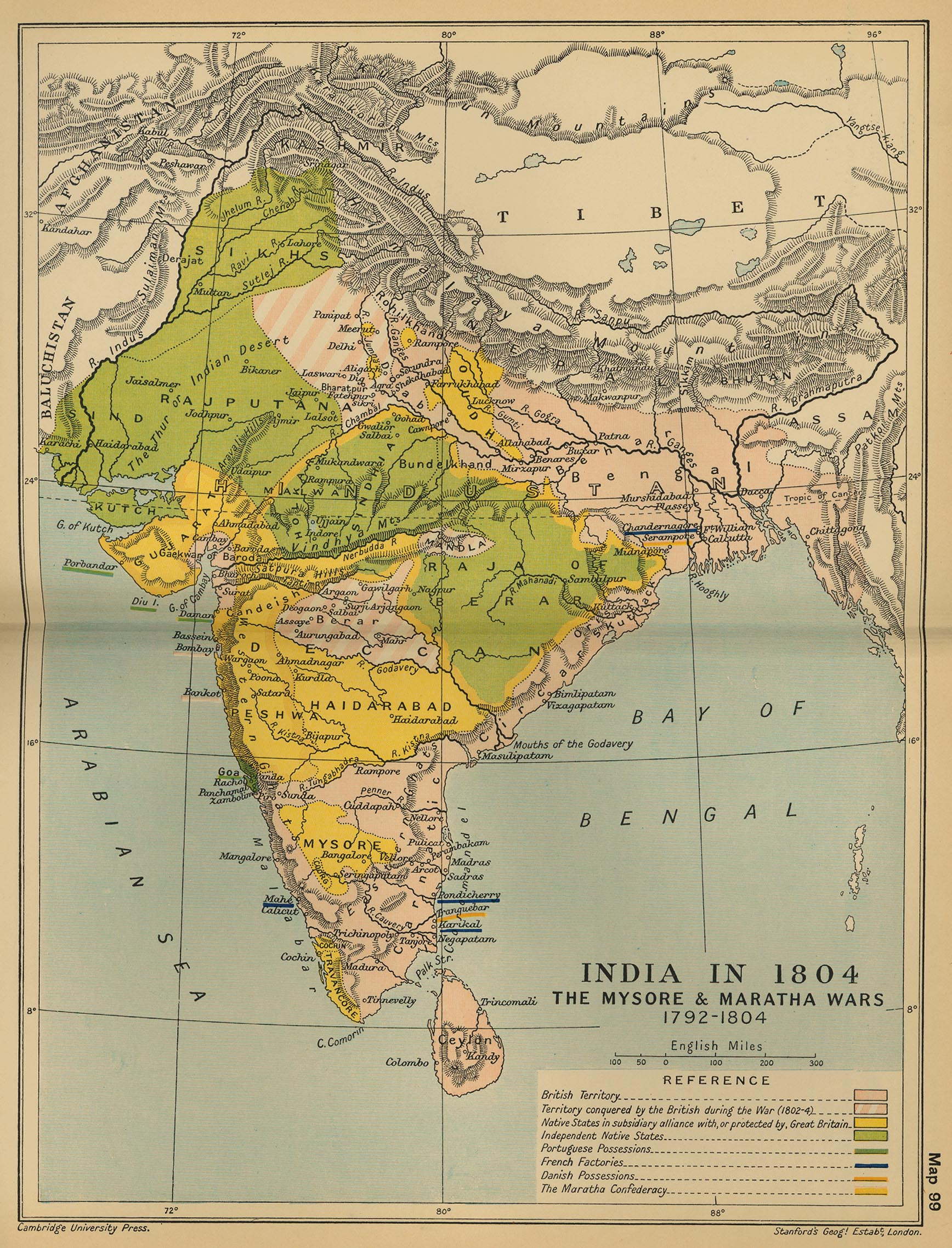
Map of India (c. 1804)

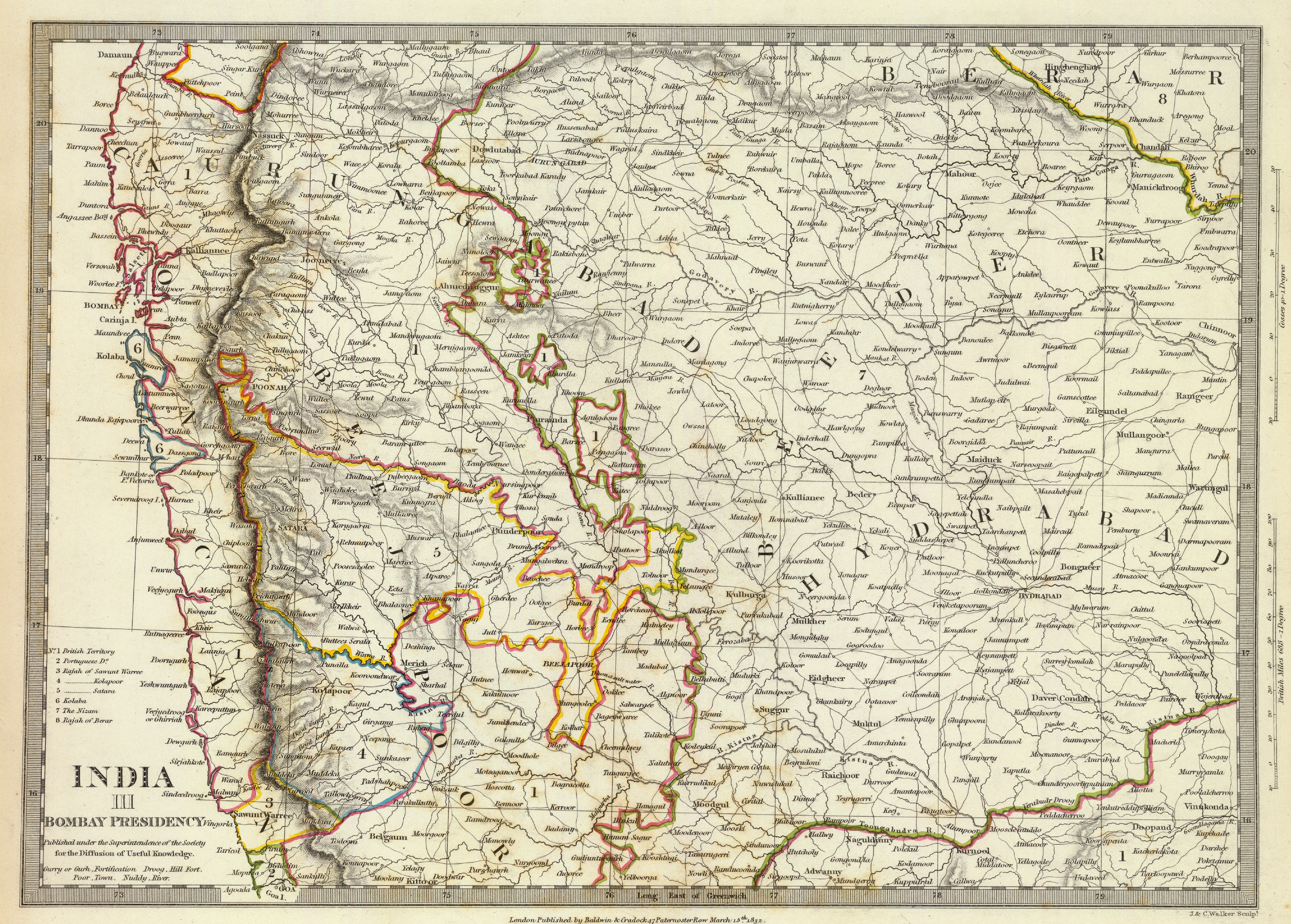
Bombay Presidency in 1832

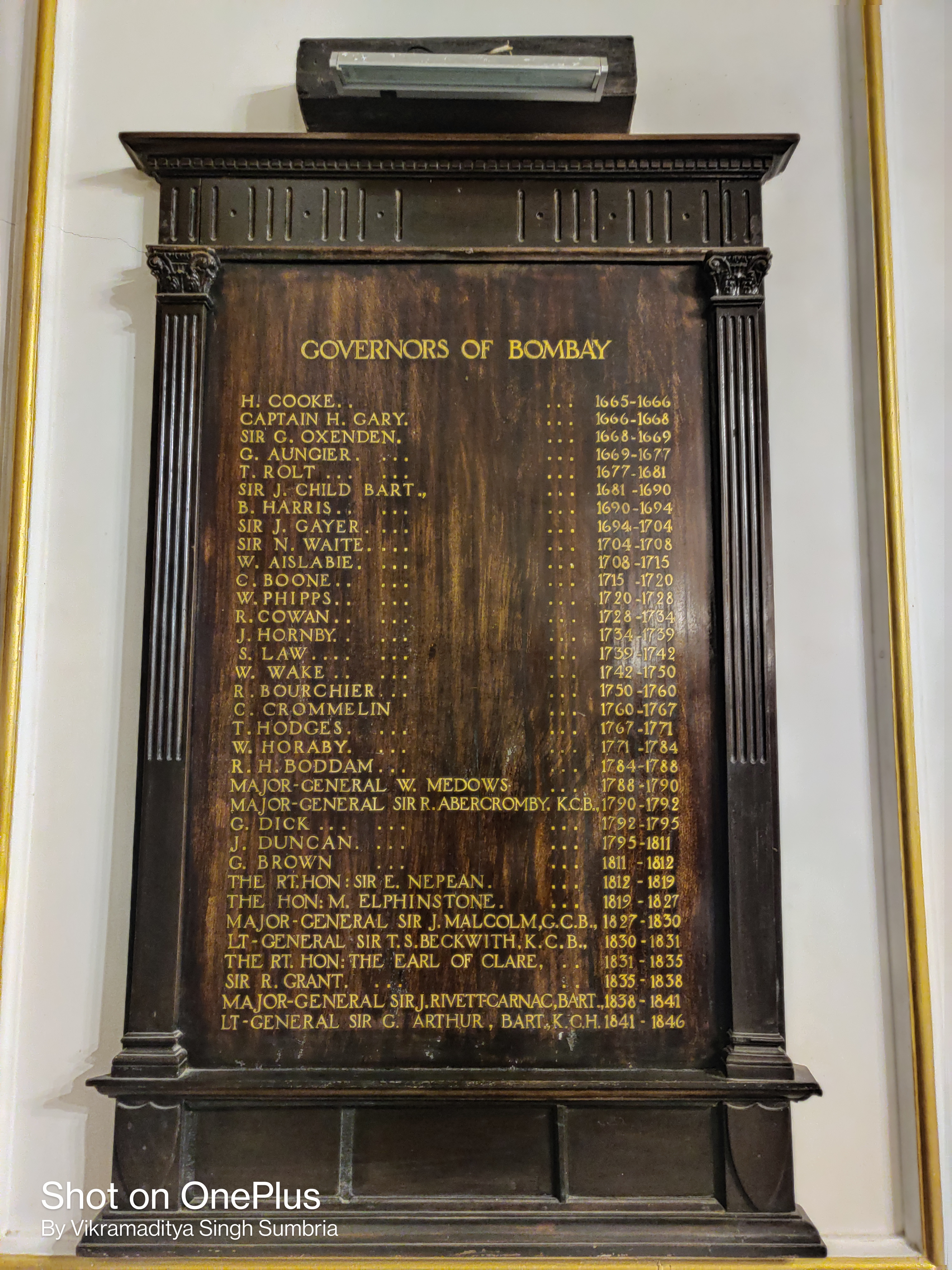
Wall Plaque of Governors of Bombay from 1665 to 1846, installed at Ball room at Lok Bhawan, Mumbai.

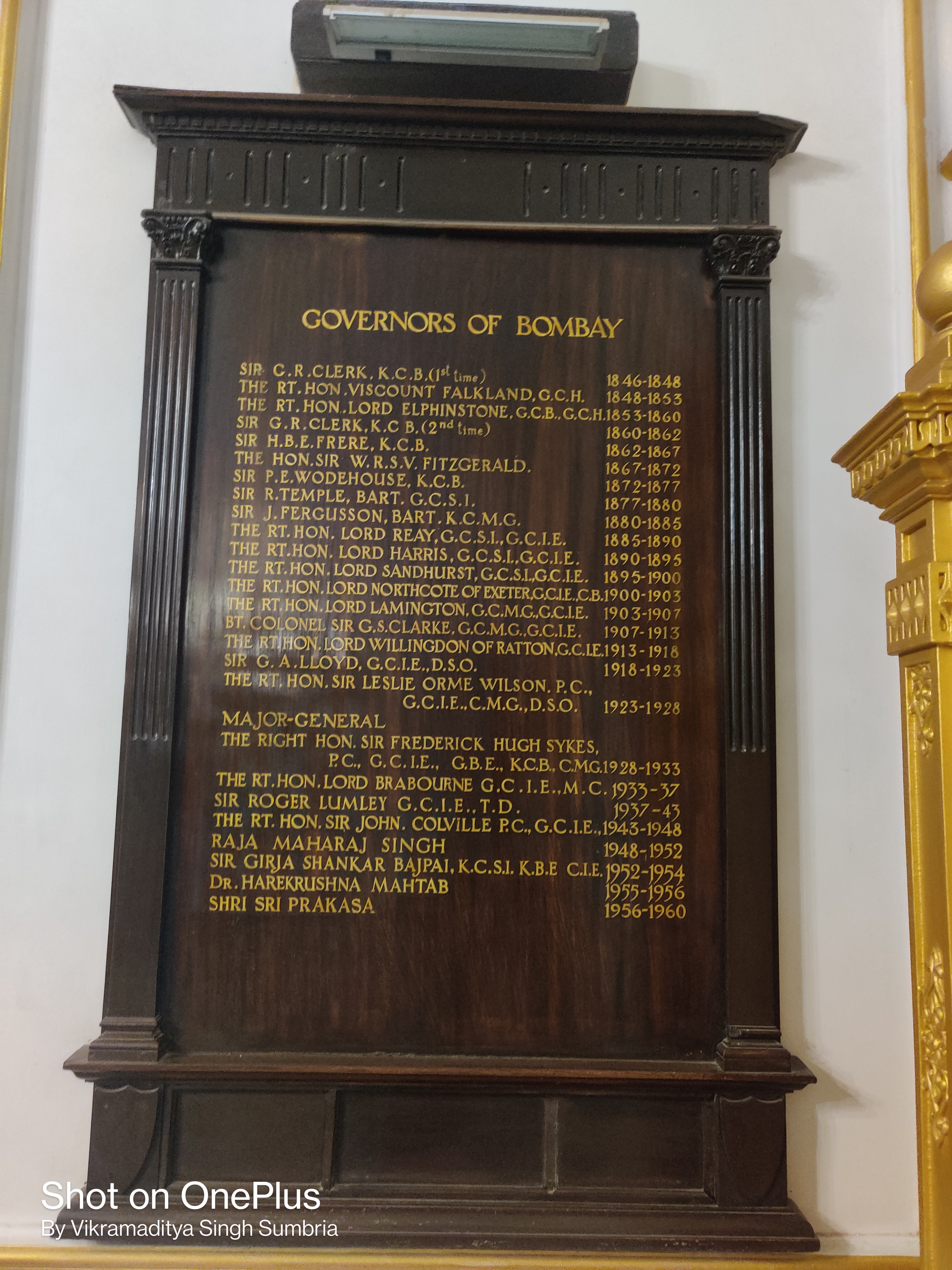
Wall Plaque of Governors of Bombay from 1846 to 1960.

On 21 September 1668, the Royal Charter of 27 March 1668 led to the transfer of Bombay from Charles II to the English East India Company for an annual rent of £10 (equivalent retail price index of £1,226 in 2007). The islands were handed over to the company on 23 September 1668. Upon the transfer, Bombay was made subordinate to the company's settlement in Surat. During 1668–87, the Governors of Bombay, who were also presidents of Surat Council, spent most of their time in Surat. During this time, Bombay was administered by a Deputy Governor.

In 1687, the Company shifted its main holdings from Surat to Bombay, which had become the administrative centre of all the west coast settlements. Following the transfer, Bombay was placed at the head of all the company's establishments in India. However, the onset of plague and cholera delayed implementation, and the headquarters was not actually moved to Bombay until 1708. During the Governorships of John Gayer, Sir Nicholas Waite, and William Aislabie (1694–1715), the Bombay governors also held the title of "General". Their main title, meanwhile, continued to be "President", with governor of Bombay being a supplementary title and role.

During the 18th century, the Maratha Empire expanded rapidly, claiming Konkan and much of eastern Gujarat from the disintegrating Mughal Empire. In western Gujarat, including Kathiawar and Kutch, the loosening of Mughal control allowed numerous local rulers to create virtually independent states. In 1737, Salsette was captured by Baji Rao I of the Maratha Empire from the Portuguese, and the Portuguese province of Bassein was ceded to the Marathas in 1739. The growth of the Bengal provinces soon undermined Bombay's supremacy. In 1753, Bombay was made subordinate to Calcutta. Thereafter, Bengal always maintained much greater importance relative to Madras and Bombay. Bankot (Fort Victoria) in Konkan was incorporated into Bombay Presidency in 1756. The First Anglo-Maratha War began with the Treaty of Surat, which was signed on 6 March 1775, between Raghunathrao of the Maratha Empire and the British. According to the treaty, Raghunathrao ceded Salsette and Bassein to the British. The war ended when Salsette, Elephanta, Hog Island, and Karanja were formally ceded to the British by the Treaty of Salbai, signed on 17 May 1782. These territories were incorporated into the Bombay Presidency. Also according to the treaty, Bassein and its dependencies were restored to Raghunathrao, while Bharuch was ceded to the Maratha ruler Scindia. The British annexed Surat on 15 May 1800. The British received the districts of Ahmadabad, Bharuch and Kaira in 1803 after British victory in the Second Anglo-Maratha War.

The framework of the Presidency formed between 1803 and 1827. The districts of Ahmadabad, Bharuch, and Kaira in Gujarat were taken over by the Bombay Government in 1805 and enlarged in 1818. The numerous small states of Kathiawar and Mahikantha were organised into princely states under British suzerainty between 1807 and 1820. Baji Rao II, the last of the Maratha Peshwas, was defeated by the British in the Battle of Kirkee, which took place near Poona in the Deccan on 5 November 1817. Following his defeat, the whole of the Deccan (except Satara and Kolhapur), and certain parts of Gujarat, were included in the Presidency. The districts included were Khandesh, Belgaum, Dharwar, Ratnagiri, Kolaba (except Alibag taluka), Poona, Ahmadnagar, Nasik. Aden was incorporated in 1839. Alibag taluka was annexed in 1840 and added to the Presidency. Sind province, which included the districts of Karachi, Hyderabad, Shikarpur, Thar and Parkar, and Upper Sind Frontier, were annexed in 1847. In 1848, the districts of Satara and Bijapur were added to the Presidency. In 1853, Panch Mahals in Gujarat was leased from the Scindias. The Canara district, which was under Madras Presidency, was bifurcated into North Canara and South Canara in 1860. South Canara remained under Madras Presidency, while North Canara was transferred to Bombay Presidency in 1861. Between 1818 and 1858, certain princely states like Mandvi in Surat and some in Satara were lapsed to the Presidency.

No.	Name	Portrait	Assumed office	Left office	Years in office	Remarks^{[a]}
1	George Oxenden		23 September 1668	14 July 1669	1	
2	Gerald Aungier		14 July 1669	30 June 1677	8	
3	Henry Oxenden		30 June 1677	27 October 1681	4	
4	John Child		27 October 1681	4 February 1690	8	
5	Richard Keigwin^{[b]}		27 December 1683	19 November 1684	1	Unofficial
6	Bartholomew Harris		4 February 1690	10 May 1694	4	
7	Daniel Annesley		10 May 1694	17 May 1694		Acting
8	John Gayer		17 May 1694	November 1704	10	
9	Nicholas Waite		November 1704	September 1708	4	
10	William Aislabie		September 1708	11 October 1715	7	
11	Stephen Strutt		11 October 1715	26 December 1715		Acting
12	Charles Boone		26 December 1715	9 January 1722	7	
13	William Phipps		9 January 1722	10 January 1729	7	
14	Robert Cowan		10 January 1729	22 September 1734	5	
15	John Horne		22 September 1734	7 April 1739	5	
16	Stephen Law		7 April 1739	15 November 1742	3	
17	John Geekie		15 November 1742	26 November 1742		Acting
18	William Wake		26 November 1742	17 November 1750	8	
19	Richard Bourchier		17 November 1750	1760	10	
20	Sir John Holkell		1760	28 February 1760		Acting
21	Charles Crommelin		28 February 1760	27 January 1767	7	
22	Thomas Hodges		27 January 1767	23 February 1771	4	
23	William Hornby		26 February 1771	1 January 1784	13	
24	Rawson Hart Boddam		1 January 1784	9 January 1788	4	
25	Andrew Ramsay		9 January 1788	6 September 1788	1	Acting
26	William Medows		6 September 1788	21 January 1790	2	
27	Robert Abercromby		21 January 1790	26 November 1792	2	
28	George Dick		26 November 1792	9 November 1795	3	Acting
29	John Griffith		9 November 1795	27 December 1795		Acting
30	Jonathan Duncan		27 December 1795	11 August 1811	16	
31	George Brown		11 August 1811	12 August 1812	1	Acting
32	Sir Evan Nepean, 1st Baronet.		12 August 1812	1 November 1819	7	
33	Mountstuart Elphinstone		1 November 1819	1 November 1827	8	
34	Sir John Malcolm		1 November 1827	1 December 1830	3	
35	Sir Thomas Sidney Beckwith		1 December 1830	15 January 1831	1	Acting
36	John Romer		17 January 1831	21 March 1831		Acting
37	John FitzGibbon, 2nd Earl of Clare		21 March 1831	17 March 1835	4	
38	Sir Robert Grant		17 March 1835	9 July 1838	3	
39	James Farish		11 July 1838	31 May 1839	1	Acting
40	James Rivett-Carnac		31 May 1839	27 April 1841	2	
41	William Hay Macnaghten		27 April 1841	28 April 1841		Acting
42	George William Anderson		28 April 1841	9 June 1842	1	Acting
43	George Arthur		9 June 1842	6 August 1846	4	
44	Lestock Robert Reid		6 August 1846	23 January 1847	1	Acting
45	George Russell Clerk		23 January 1847	1 May 1848	1	Acting
46	Lucius Cary, 10th Viscount Falkland		1 May 1848	26 December 1853	5	
47	John Elphinstone, 13th Lord Elphinstone		26 December 1853	11 May 1860	7	
48	George Russell Clerk		11 May 1860	24 April 1862	2	Acting

Sources: The India List and India Office List and Oxford Dictionary of National Biography

Deputy Governors of Bombay (1668–1690)
The transfer of the headquarters of the company's power to Bombay largely eliminated the need for a Deputy Governor. In spite of the change, the title continued to be borne by the second member of the Executive Council of the Governor. It fell into disuse sometime between 1720 and 1758.

No.	Name	Assumed office	Left office	Years in office
1	Henry Young	1668	13 November 1669	2
2	Matthew Gray	1670	1670	
3	Phillip Gifford	1670	1676	6
4	Henry Oxenden	1676	1682	6
5	Charles Ward^{[b]}	1682	1683	1
6	Charles Zinzan	1684	1686	2
7	John Wyborne	1686	1688	2
8	John Vaux	1689	1689	
9	George Cooke	1689	1690	1
10	George Weldon	1690	1690	
11	John Burniston	1690	1704	14

Source: Origin of Bombay

== Crown governors (1862–1948) ==
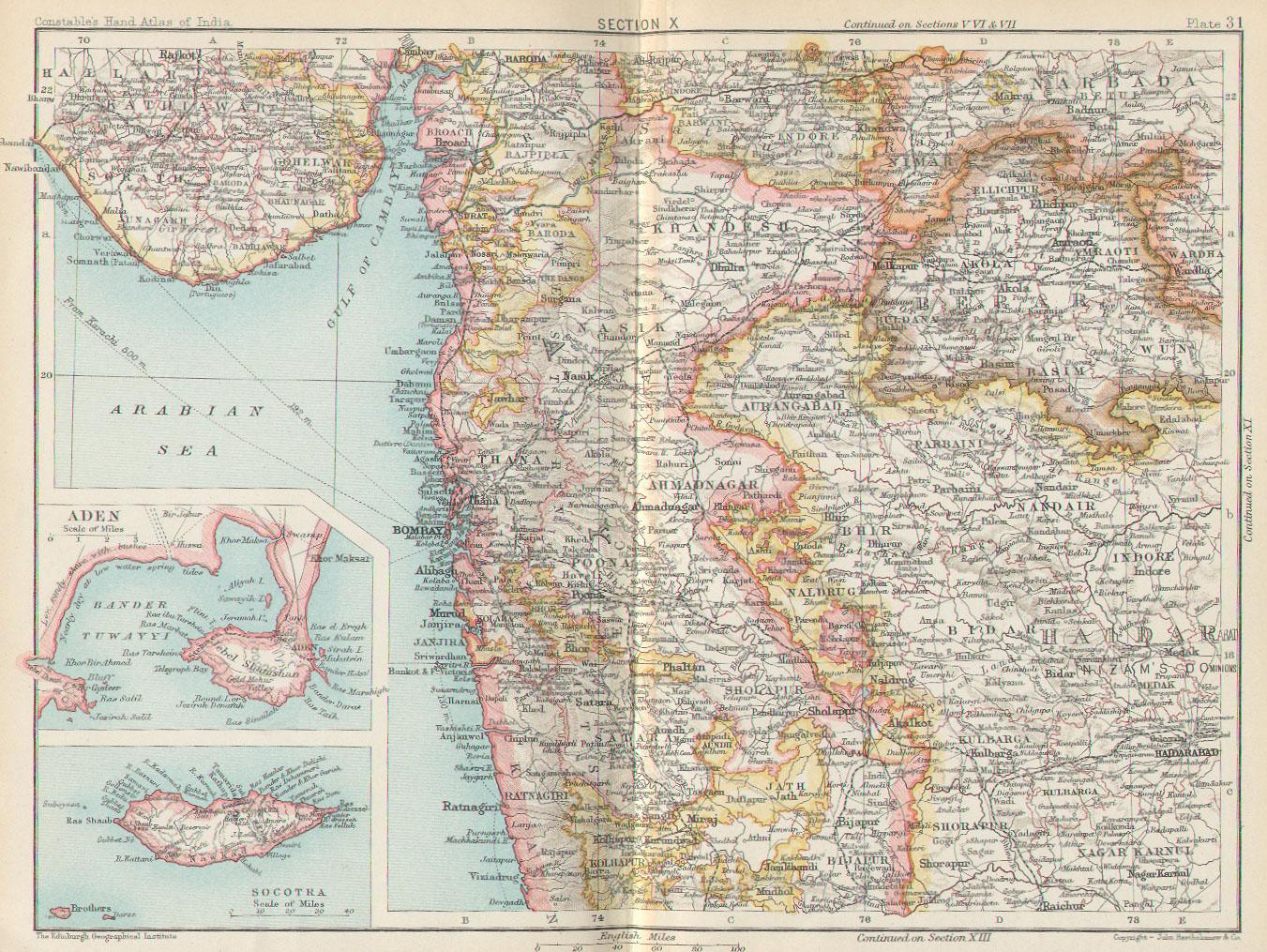
Bombay Presidency in 1893

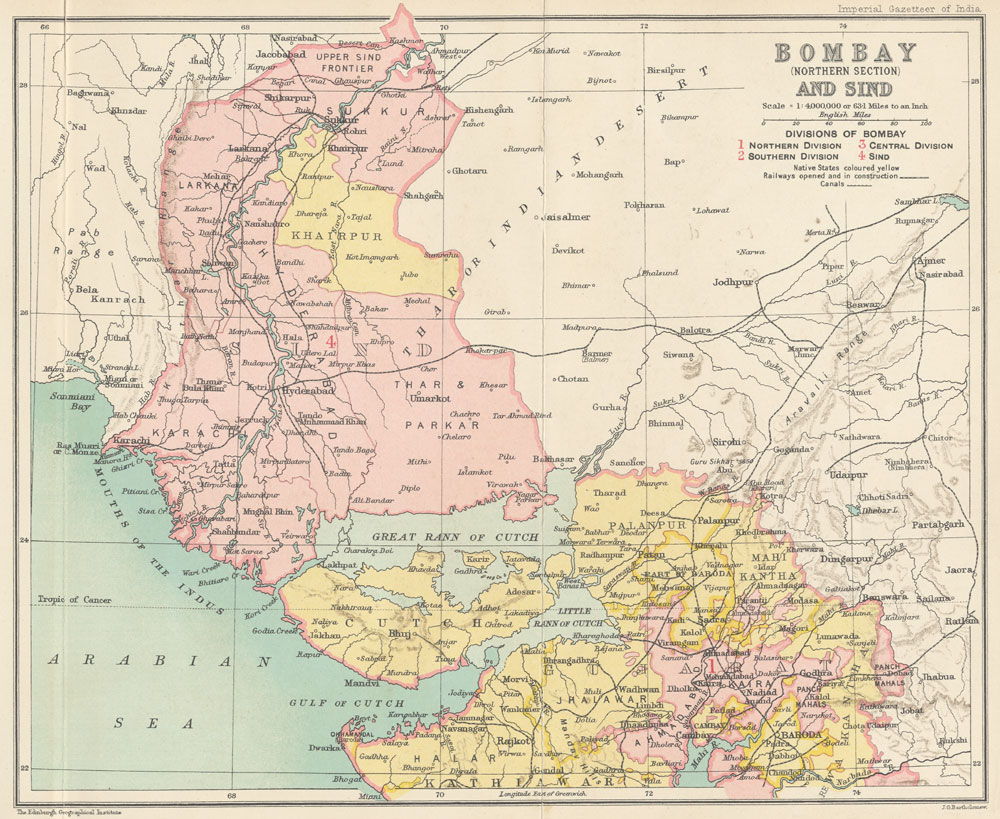
Bombay Presidency in 1909 (northern portion)

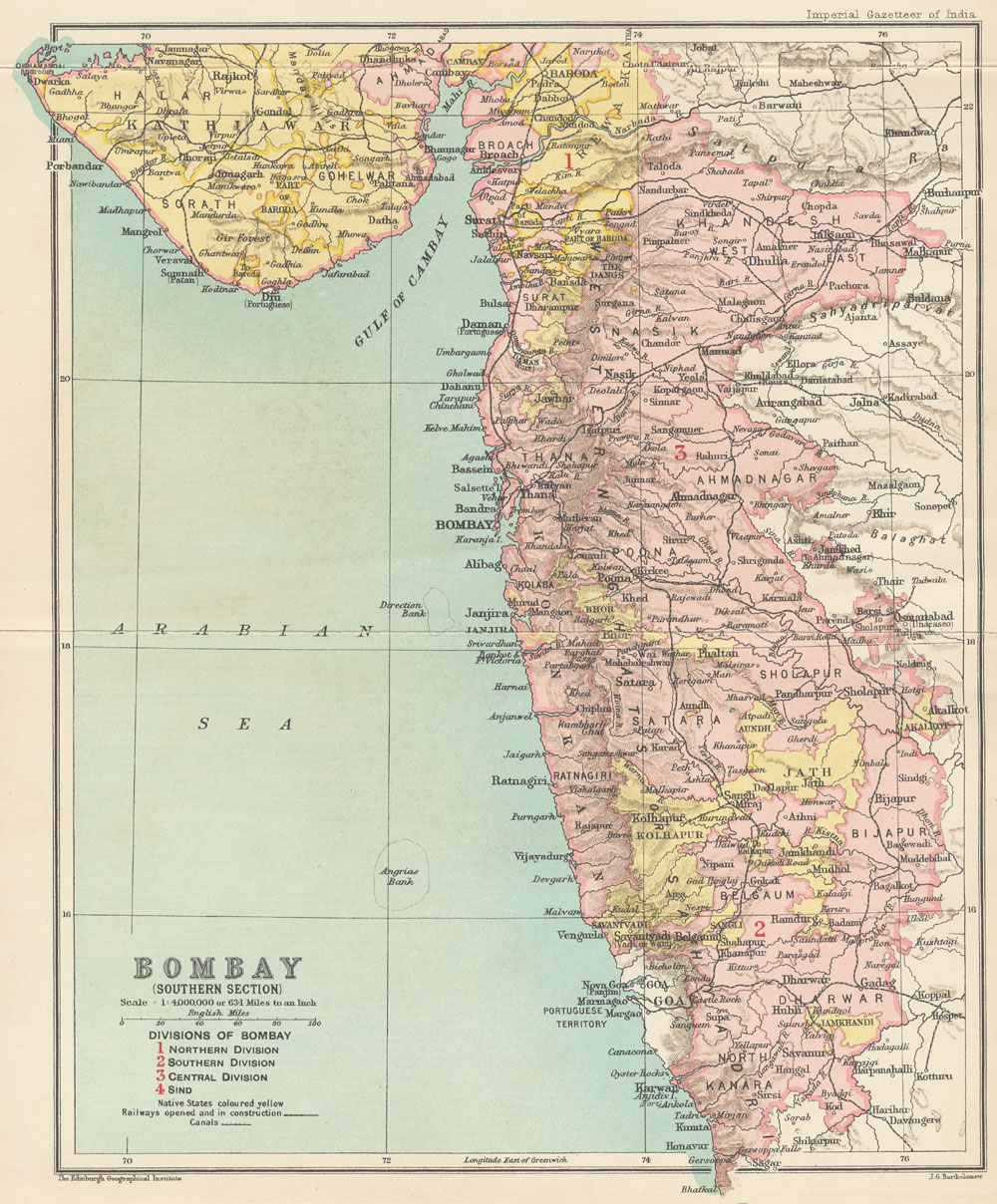
Bombay Presidency in 1909, (southern portion)

Following the Indian Rebellion of 1857, the company was accused of mismanagement, and Bombay reverted to the British Crown. On 2 August 1858, the British Parliament began abolition of the company and asserted full, direct Crown authority over India. The execution was slow. The company for purposes of liquidation maintained its formal existence until 1874. India was thereafter directly ruled by the Crown as a colony of the United Kingdom, and officially known as the Empire of India after 1876. India consisted of some regions referred to as British India that were directly administered by the British and other regions called the Princely States that were ruled by Indian rulers.

Laws were made for British India by a Legislative Council under the Viceroy having wide powers of legislation. This council could pass laws as important as any Acts by the British Parliament. The Legislative Council was made of six members besides the Viceroy. In addition, the governors served as extraordinary members when the Legislative Council met in their provinces. They also had an Executive Council of two members of the Indian Civil Service for 12 years standing, appointed by the Crown.

The Governor would consult the Executive Council in the exercise of all his functions (except on trivial or urgent matters or where the public interest made it undesirable). He would not be required to consult in cases where he was specifically authorised by the Constitution to act in his discretion or on the advice of, or after consultation with, some other person or authority. He would in general act in accordance with the advice of the Executive Council but could act against such advice, where he considered it necessary in the interests of the public order, public faith or good government; in such cases he would be required to seek approval of the Secretary of State for India.

The Governor didn't have the right to make or suspend any laws, unless in cases of urgent necessity, he could do it with the consent of the Governor-General of India. He didn't have the power of creating a new office, or granting any salary, gratuity, or allowance, without the sanction of the Governor-General of India. The Governor-General had full power to superintend and control the Governor in all points relating to the civil or military administration of the Presidency, and the Governor had to obey the orders and instructions of the Governor-General in all cases. The Governors could propose to the Governor-General drafts of any laws which they thought expedient, together with their reasons for the same; and the Governor-General communicated the resolutions to the Governor, after considering the reasons. The Governors regularly transmitted to the Governor-General true copies of all orders and acts of their governments, and also advice of all matters which they felt to be communicated to the Governor-General. The powers of the Governors were not suspended when the Governor-General visited the Presidency. The departure of the Governor from India with intent to return to Europe was deemed to be a resignation from his office. Alternately, the Governor could resign by declaring it in writing and delivering it to the secretary for the public department of the Presidency.

In 1906, Bombay Presidency had four commissionerships and twenty-six districts with Bombay City as its capital. The four commissionerships were the northern province of Gujarat, the central province of Deccan, the southern province of Carnatic, and the northwestern province of Sind. The 26 districts were Bombay City, Bombay Island,^{[c]} Ahmedabad, Bharuch, Kaira, Panch Mahal, Surat, Thana, Ahmednagar, East Khandesh,^{[d]} West Khandesh,^{[d]} Nasik, Poona, Satara, Solapur, Belgaum, Bijapur, Dharwar, North Canara, Kolaba, Ratnagiri, Karachi, Hyderabad, Shikarpur, Thar and Parkar and Upper Sind Frontier. Aden separated from Bombay Presidency in 1932, and Sind separated in 1936.

No.	Name	Portrait	Assumed office	Left office	Years in office	Remarks^{[a]}
1	Sir Bartle Frere		24 April 1862	6 March 1867	5	
2	Sir William Vesey-FitzGerald		6 March 1867	6 May 1872	5	
3	Sir Philip Wodehouse		6 May 1872	30 April 1877	5	
4	Sir Richard Temple, 1st Baronet		30 April 1877	13 March 1880	3	
5	Lionel Robert Ashburner		13 March 1880	28 April 1880		Acting
6	Sir James Fergusson, 6th Baronet		28 April 1880	27 March 1885	5	
7	James Braithwaite Peile		27 March 1885	30 March 1885		Acting
8	Donald Mackay, 11th Lord Reay		30 March 1885	12 April 1890	5	
9	George Harris, 4th Baron Harris		27 March 1890	16 February 1895	5	
10	Herbert Mills Birdwood		16 February 1895	18 February 1895		Acting
11	William Mansfield, 2nd Baron Sandhurst		18 February 1895	17 February 1900	5	
12	Henry Northcote, 1st Baron Northcote		17 February 1900	5 September 1903	3	
13	James Monteath		5 September 1903	12 December 1903		Acting
14	Charles Cochrane-Baillie, 2nd Baron Lamington		12 December 1903	27 July 1907	4	
15	John William Muir Mackenzie		27 July 1907	18 October 1907		Acting
16	Sir George Sydenham Clarke		18 October 1907	5 April 1913	6	
17	Freeman Freeman-Thomas, 1st Baron Willingdon		5 April 1913	16 December 1918	5	
18	Sir George Lloyd		16 December 1918	8 December 1923	5	
19	Maurice Hayward		8 December 1923	10 December 1923		Acting
20	Sir Leslie Orme Wilson		10 December 1923	8 December 1928	5	
21	Sir Henry Staveley Lawrence		20 March 1926	19 July 1926		Acting
22	Sir Frederick Sykes		9 December 1928	9 December 1933	5	
23	John Ernest Buttery Hotson^{[e]}		1931	1931		Acting
24	Michael Knatchbull, 5th Baron Brabourne		9 December 1933	30 May 1937	4	
25	Robert Duncan Bell		30 May 1937	18 September 1937		Acting
26	Lawrence Lumley, 11th Earl of Scarbrough		18 September 1937	24 March 1943	6	
27	Sir John Colville		24 March 1943	5 January 1948	5	

Sources: Oxford Dictionary of National Biography and Governor of Maharashtra

Chief Ministers of Bombay (1937–1947)

No.	Name	Portrait	Assumed office	Left office	Years in Office
1	Bal Gangadhar Kher		1937	October 1939	2
2	Governor's rule		October 1939	30 March 1946	7
3	Bal Gangadhar Kher		30 March 1946	15 August 1947	1

Source: Oxford Dictionary of National Biography

== Post independence (1948–1960) ==
Maharashtra State

After India gained independence in 1947, Bombay Presidency became part of India, and Sind province became part of Pakistan. The territory retained by India was restructured into Bombay State. It included princely states such as Kolhapur in Deccan, Baroda, Dang in Gujarat, which were under the political influence of Bombay Presidency. As a result of the States Reorganisation Act of 1956, the Kannada-speaking districts of Belgaum (except Chandgad taluk), Bijapur, Dharwar, and North Canara were transferred from Bombay State to Mysore State. In Lok Sabha discussions in 1955, the Congress party demanded that the city be constituted as an autonomous city-state. In 1956, the States Reorganisation Committee recommended a bilingual state for Maharashtra-Gujarat with Bombay as its capital. In the 1957 elections, the Samyukta Maharashtra movement opposed these proposals, and insisted that Bombay be declared the capital of Maharashtra. Following protests by the movement in which 105 people were killed by police, Bombay State was reorganised on linguistic lines on 1 May 1960. Gujarati-speaking areas of Bombay State were partitioned into the state of Gujarat. Maharashtra State with Bombay as its capital was formed with the merger of Marathi-speaking areas of Bombay State, eight districts from Central Provinces and Berar, five districts from Hyderabad State, and numerous princely states enclosed between them. In 1960, the designation of the "Governor of Bombay" was transmuted as the Governor of Maharashtra.

No.	Name	Portrait	Assumed office	Left office	Years in Office
1	Raja Sir Maharaj Singh		6 January 1948	30 May 1952	4
2	Sir Girija Shankar Bajpai		30 May 1952	5 December 1954	2
3	Harekrushna Mahatab		2 March 1955	14 October 1956	1
4	Sri Prakasa^{[f]}		10 December 1956	16 April 1962	6

Sources: Governor of Maharashtra and Greater Bombay District Gazetteer

== See also ==
- List of governors of Maharashtra
- Governors of India
- History of Mumbai

== Notes ==
a The Acting Governors were appointed for a temporary period until the post of Governor was filled. Whenever there was a vacancy for the post of the Governor, and no provisional or other successor was available, then the member of the Executive Council of the Governor, next in rank to the Governor, other than the Commander-in-chief of the Presidency, would be selected as the Governor. If the Executive Council was not available, then the senior secretary of Government of the Presidency, executed the office of Governor until a successor arrived. Every Acting Governor was entitled to the emoluments and salaries appertaining to the office of Governor, until the time he held the post.
b In 1683, Bombay was the scene of a revolt headed by Richard Keigwin, the third member of the Council against the company's authority. Placing Deputy Governor Charles Ward under arrest, Keigwin ruled Bombay in the King's name from 27 December 1683 to 19 November 1684, when on promise of pardon he handed over the island to Admiral Thomas Grantham.
c Bombay Island was treated as a separate district under a Collector.
d Khandesh was partitioned into East Khandesh and West Khandesh in 1906.
e John Ernest Buttery Hotson, Member of the Executive Council of Bombay (1926–31), was appointed Acting Governor of Bombay for a short period on the departure of Frederick Sykes.
f Sri Prakasa was Governor of Bombay from 10 December 1956 to 1 May 1960 and Governor of Maharashtra thereafter from 1 May 1960 to 16 April 1962.
