= Thomas Grantham (merchant) =

English merchant and naval officer

- Born: 1641
- Died: 1718
- Occupations: Naval officer, tobacco trader

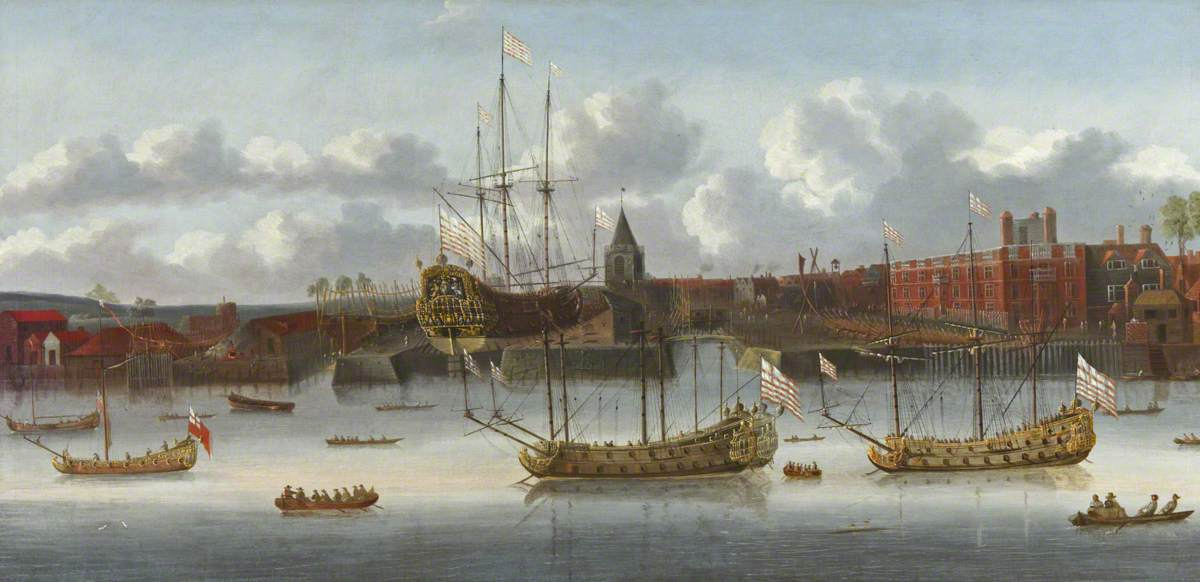
East India Company ships at Deptford. The large East Indiaman being fitted out in the dock is Sir Grantham's ship Charles the Second. .

Sir Thomas Grantham (bapt. 23 December 1641 – January 1718) was an English merchant and naval officer. In 1664, Grantham was working as a merchant, shipping woollen goods to the English colony of Virginia. Eight years later, he informed Charles II of England that Virginia lacked sufficient weapons and ammunition for self-defence and volunteered his services to that effect. Grantham subsequently arrived in Virginia with a shipment of leather goods and letter of recommendation from Duke of York. Governor Sir William Berkeley received Grantham "with several marks of friendship and esteem" and appointed him admiral of a flotilla of 25 merchantmen which he convoyed back to England in summer 1673. In 1674, as captain of Barnaby, Grantham escorted the London tobacco fleet to Virginia, becoming a prominent tobacco trader and "master of Virginia's waters and an expert on their defenses".

In September 1676, Grantham arrived in Virginia while in command of the 32-gun Concord during Bacon's Rebellion. Berkeley asked him to act as intermediary with the rebels led by Nathaniel Bacon. Grantham arranged a surrender by one group of rebels on 2 January 1677 by promising them all a pardon and breaking out a barrel of brandy to calm everyone's nerves. He then persuaded another group of rebels to surrender using similar tactics. Charles II awarded Grantham £200 for his services. On his next voyage to Virginia in 1678, Grantham beat off an attack by a large Algerian corsair, which led Charles II to recommended him to the East India Company (EIC). The EIC granted him a captain's commission for the East Indiaman Charles the Second, and he was knighted by the king at the ship's launch on 8 February 1683.

In the summer of 1683, he sailed to Asia with instructions to enforce EIC claims against Safavid Iran for half the customs revenues collected at Gombroon, a port at the entrance to the Persian Gulf, and to reassert EIC control over Bantam, where the company had been expelled by the Banten Sultanate and Dutch East India Company (VOC). Grantham reached Bantam in June 1684, but by then a settlement had been reached in London. He proceeded to Gombroon, but found the VOC already in possession; unable to carry out his mission, Grantham sailed to Surat, where he received orders from governor of Bombay John Child to suppress a mutiny at Bombay, where Captain Richard Keigwin had seized power. By diplomatic handling of the affair Keigwin and his supporters were won over. Grantham was also responsible for the strengthening of the walls of the Mahim Fort against attacks by the Portuguese who had occupied Salsette Island, and returned to England in 1685.

On his return, Grantham brought two south Asian men named Mahomet and Shackshoone with him back to London as servants. Shackshoone had a parasitic twin, described as "having a Child growing out of his side". They were contracted to Grantham for six months, during which time Grantham exhibited Shackshoone for money. At the end of their contract, Grantham refused to allow them to leave, and both men ran away. Grantham was able to recapture Shackshoone, and in the subsequent trial, Chief Justice Edward Herbert ruled that Grantham was legally able to order Shackshoone's recapture by the sheriff, even though he was no longer under contract, suggesting that Shackshoone was considered legally enslaved. Shackshoone attempted to escape a second time in 1688. It is not known whether he was recaptured.

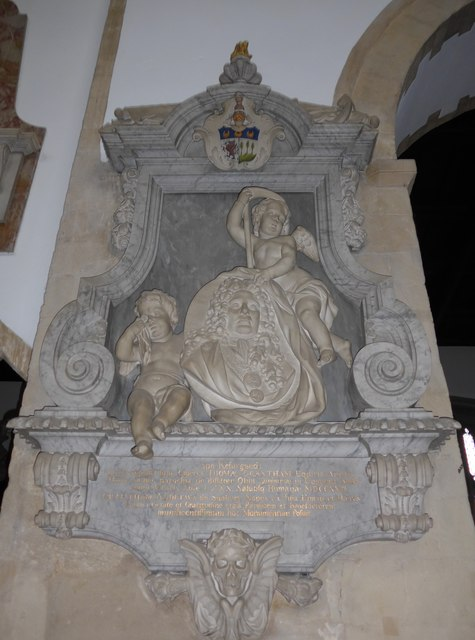
Memorial to Thomas Grantham in St Edburg's Church, Bicester

In April 1689, Grantham was appointed as a Gentleman of the Privy Chamber and Esquire of the Body to William III of England and Mary II, offices he retained under Anne, Queen of Great Britain. In 1690 he bought a manor in Sunbury-on-Thames, Middlesex, where he built Batavia House in 1697. He obtained a grant of arms in 1711, and died, probably in Sunbury, in January 1718. In his will, Grantham asked to be buried at Bicester, specifically in the middle aisle of Bicester parish church "where I received my Christianity and where my mother and father lyeth buried... and near that place to set up a marble monument of no less value than 200 Guineas with my name and age on it". He was buried there on 22 January and such a monument was erected by his nephew Andrew.

== Works ==
- An Historical Account of Some Memorable Actions, Particularly in Virginia; Also Against the Admiral of Algier, and in the East Indies: Perform'd for the Service of his Prince and Country, By Sir Thomas Grantham, Kt, J Roberts, London MDCCXVI; Reprinted by Carlton McCarthy & Co., at the behest of the State of Virginia, with an introduction by R.A. Brock, Esquire, Secretary Virginia Historical Society, 1882
