= Governor Bourchier =

Governor Bourchier may refer to:

- Charles Bourchier (governor) (died 1810), Governor of Madras from 1767 to 1770
- Richard Bourchier, Governor of Bombay from 1750 to 1760
