= John Gayer (governor of Bombay) =

British colonial administrator (died 1711)

Sir John Gayer (died 1711) was the governor of the East India Company from May 1694 to November 1704. The general was in charge of all the company's affairs in India. He was also the governor of Bombay for the same period. Gayer's tenure was dominated by conflict with the English Company Trading to the East Indies (New Company), set up in 1698. This led to his imprisonment in Surat for many years.

== Life ==
He was the son of Humfrey Gayer, merchant, of Plymouth, Devon, and nephew of Sir John Gayer, Lord Mayor of London. The Gayer family originally came from Liskeard. At an early age, he entered the service of the East India Company, and rose to be a sea captain. On being appointed by the owners commander of the ship Society, he was admitted into the freedom of the company on 7 April 1682. On 3 June 1692 he was chosen governor of the port and island of Bombay.

In 1693, when Sir John Goldsborough was appointed General by the company, Gayer was to succeed him in case of death. He went out in December 1693 as governor of Bombay and General, reaching the Indian coast at Calicut on 5 March 1694, and there hearing of the death of Goldsborough.

In 1699 the forerunners of the New Company were followed by Sir Nicholas Waite (a dismissed agent of the old company) as president at Surat and king's consul. Waite intrigued against the Old Company, and charged his rivals with piracy. The servants of the Old (or London) Company refused to recognise the new men or the authority of Sir William Norris, who came out as William III's ambassador to Aurangzeb. The ambassador arrived on 10 December 1700, convoyed by four king's ships. A contest in bribery began between the agents of the two companies. Gayer left his stronghold at Bombay and came to Swally (Suvali), the roadstead of Surat, to arrange the disputes in which the governor of Surat was involved. He was arrested there, in consequence apparently of Waite's charges.

Along with his wife and some of his council, Gayer was removed to Surat by a body of native troops, and confined to the factory. His confinement, with some temporary suspension, endured for years. He was still a prisoner at the beginning of 1709, when the Old and New companies had been amalgamated. In letters dated from Surat, 31 March and 25 April 1706, Gayer and his council give a picture of the anarchy in Gujarat and the country between Surat and Ahmedabad. In the end the Old Company, in a letter to Gayer, dated 20 April 1708, stated that Waite had been removed; and, as Gayer's captivity disqualified him from succeeding, William Aislabie, deputy-governor at Bombay, had been appointed general in his place. They also hinted that Gayer might have gained his liberty had he not stood so much on the details of the release. He was released by 5 October 1710. On that day he made his will in Bombay Castle, and died there, probably in the following year. He was twice married but had no children.

== Notes ==
Government offices
Preceded by Daniel Annesley	Governor of Bombay; 1694 – 1704	Succeeded by Nicholas Waite
