= George Weldon (deputy governor) =

English merchant and Deputy Governor of Bombay

George Weldon (died 1697) was an English merchant and the Deputy Governor of Bombay.

== Life ==
John Ovington described Weldon as "a gentleman well descended". According to one source, he was Deputy Governor of Bombay from 1688, succeeding on the death of Sir John Wyborne. Another source puts John Vaux, and George Cooke who died, between Wyborne and Weldon, who was Deputy Governor from 1690.

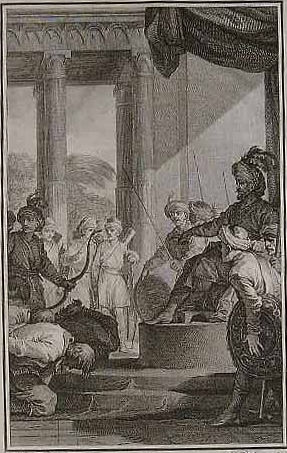
Les Anglois demandent pardon à Aurangzeb qu’ils ont offensé (The English ask Aurangzeb, whom they have offended, for forgiveness), copperplate engraving from Histoire philosophique et politique des établissemens et du commerce des Européens dans les deux Indes by Guillaume Thomas François Raynal, published 1780 in Geneva

In 1689 Weldon, described as a factor, was sent to Vasai (Bassein) with Abraham Navarro, by Sir John Child, 1st Baronet as Governor. The mission was to treat for terms with the Mughals; Child died in 1690 before they returned to Bombay. Mughal Emperor Aurangzeb settled the state of war that had existed with the East India Company in February 1690, on heavy conditions. Weldon died on his voyage back to England and was buried in Mauritius in 1697.

== Family ==
Weldon married Susannah, the widow of Sir John Child, in 1692; she was the daughter of Captain John Shaxton or Shackstone, a previous Deputy Governor.

== Legacy ==
Susannah Weldon erected a monument on his grave that served as a landmark for shipping. Its location became known as Baie du Tombeau (Tomb Bay), which may refer to Weldon's monument, or an earlier loss of Dutch ships there in 1615.
