= Governor Cook =

Governor Cook or Cooke may refer to:

- Henry D. Cooke (1825–1881), territorial governor of the District of Columbia
- Howard Cooke (1915–2014), Governor-General of Jamaica
- Humphrey Cooke, Governor of Bombay from 1665 1666
- John Cook (governor) (1730–1789), President of Delaware
- Lorrin A. Cooke (1831–1902), Governor of Connecticut
- Nicholas Cooke (1717–1782), governor of the Colony of Rhode Island and Providence Plantations
