= Richard Keigwin =

Richard Keigwin may refer to:

- R. P. Keigwin (Richard Prescott Keigwin, 1883–1972), English academic and cricketer
- Richard Keigwin (colonial administrator) (died 1690), governor of Bombay, 1683–1684
