= Governor Lucas =

Governor Lucas may refer to:

- Frank Lucas (Wyoming politician) (1876–1948), 13th Governor of Wyoming
- Gervase Lucas (1611–1667), Governor of Bombay from 1666 to 1667
- Robert Lucas (governor) (1781–1853), 12th Governor of Ohio and 1st Governor of Iowa Territory
