= Governor Grey =

Governor Grey or Gray may refer to:

- Charles Edward Grey (1785–1865), Governor of Barbados from 1841 to 1846 and Governor of Jamaica from 1847 to 1853
- George Grey (1812–1898), Governor of South Australia from 1841 to 1845, Governor of New Zealand 1845 to 1854 and from 1861 to 1868, and Governor of Cape Colony from 1854 to 1861
- Isaac P. Gray (1828–1895), 18th and 20th Governor of the U.S. state of Indiana
- Matthew Gray (Governor of Bombay) (fl. 1670s), acting Governor of Bombay from 1669 to 1672
- Ralph Grey, Baron Grey of Naunton (1910–1999), Governor of British Guiana from 1958 to 1964, Governor of the Bahamas from 1964 to 1968, and Governor of Northern Ireland from 1968 to 1973
- William Grey (governor) (1818–1878), Governor of Jamaica from 1874 to 1877
- Governor Grey (horse), second-place finisher in the 1911 Kentucky Derby
