= Governor Ward =

Governor Ward may refer to:

- Alfred Dudley Ward (1905–1991), Governor of Gibraltar from 1962 to 1965
- Charles Ward (Deputy Governor of Bombay), Deputy Governor of Bombay from 1682 to 1683
- Henry George Ward (1797–1860), 11th Governor of British Ceylon from 1855 to 1860
- Marcus Lawrence Ward (1812–1884), 21st Governor of New Jersey
- Richard Ward (governor) (1689–1763), Governor of the Colony of Rhode Island and Providence Plantations from 1741 to 1742
- Samuel Ward (Rhode Island politician) (1725–1776), 31st and 33rd Governor of the Colony of Rhode Island and Providence Plantations from 1762 to 1763 and from 1765 to 1767

== See also ==
- Henry Warde (governor) (1766–1834), Governor of Barbados from 1821 to 1827
