= Sir William Norris, 1st Baronet =

English politician

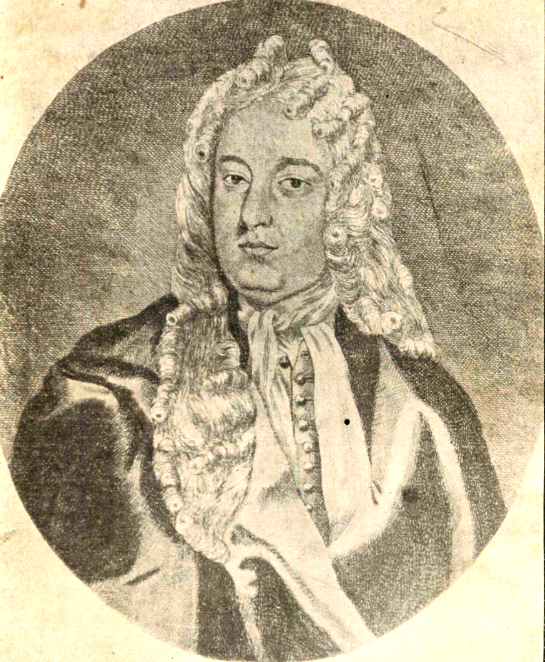
Sir William Norris, 1st Baronet

Arms of Norris of Speke: Quarterly argent and gules, in the second and third quarters a fret or, over all a fess azure.

Sir William Norris, 1st Baronet (c. 1658 – 10 October 1702) was an English diplomat and politician who sat in the House of Commons from 1695 to 1701. He was also a servant of the East India Company, and served as ambassador to the Mogul Emperor Aurangzeb. The family name is sometimes spelt Norres or Norreys.

== Life ==
=== Origins ===
He was the second son of Thomas Norris of Speke Hall, Lancashire, by Katherine, daughter of Sir Henry Garraway. The eldest son, Thomas Norris (1653–1700), was a Whig MP for Liverpool, 1688 to 1690 and 1690 to 1695. William succeeded his eldest brother, Thomas, as member for Liverpool in 1695, and held the seat till 1701; he was re-elected during his absence in India, but unseated on petition. He was made a baronet on 3 December 1698, of Speke, Lancashire. The title became extinct on his death.

=== India ===
In 1698 the new General Society or English Company (less accurately, the "New East India Company") obtained an act of parliament and letters patent from the Crown for the purpose of trading to the East Indies, and in order to obtain the necessary privileges from the Mughal Emperor Aurangzeb, Sir William Norris, specially created a baronet for the mission, was sent out to India as king's commissioner in a ship of war, at a salary of £2,000 a year, paid by the company. He was expected to obtain the protection and privileges of the Mughal authorities in favour of the new company, in face of the opposition of the officers of the East India Company (the old or 'London' East India Company), which had been the accredited representative of British commerce in India for a century. The Old Company had its firmans from the Mughal Emperors conferring special privileges of trading.

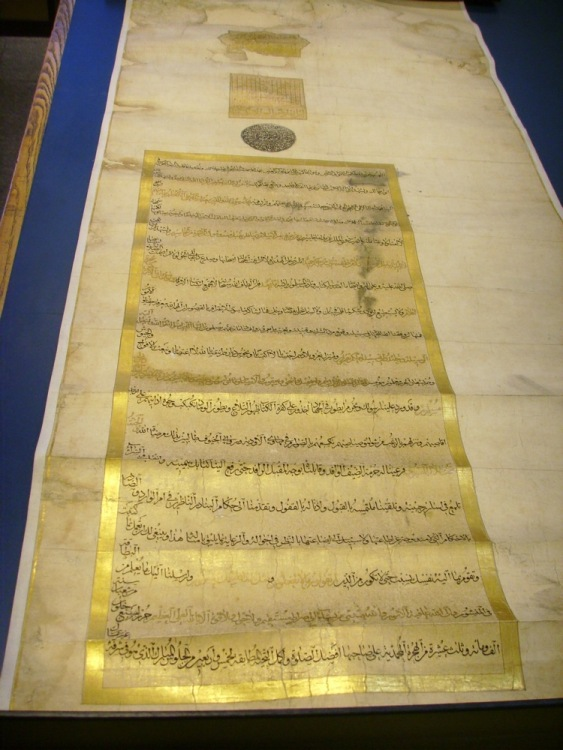
Letter from Aurangzeb to William III (BL Or. 6286)

Norris landed on 25 September 1699 at Masulipatam on the Indian east coast, where he found Consul Pitt of the English Company (not to be confused with Thomas Pitt) expecting him. The situation on the ground was complicated by the actions of Sir Nicholas Waite, the English company's representative at Surat, who had written to Aurangzeb, before Norris's arrival, to request firmans of privileges, and offering to suppress piracy on the Indian seas in return. The English company was incompetent to carry the offer into effect. Niccolao Manucci excused himself as an interpreter, and Pitt had made no preparations for the inland journey. Norris fell out with him, and sailed on 23 August 1700 for Swally (Suvali), the port on the Indian west coast for Surat, which he reached on 10 December.

Norris paid for an impressive state entry into Surat. On 27 January 1701 he set out from Surat on a journey to the emperor's camp, which was then some way south of Burhanpur. He was escorted by over sixty Europeans, including his younger brother Edward Norris, and three hundred Indians. The route taken across Maharashtra via Daulatabad, Aurangabad and Jalgaon was around 470 miles, and took 38 days, with Burhanpur reached on 6 March. While in Burhanpur Norris let protocol stand in the way of meeting Asad Khan, chief vizier to the Emperor. He set off south to meet the Emperor himself, who was engaged in a siege operation at Panhala fort, and arrived in the vicinity on 4 April. An audience was granted on 28 April, and King William's letter was presented in an elaborate ceremony with many gifts. In the substantive negotiations, however, Aurangzeb put his finger on the offer to suppress piracy in the Indian Ocean, particularly since it affected pilgrims on the hajj; while Norris was unwilling to give sufficient guarantees. This point proved the stumbling block, and while both Companies made substantial monetary gifts Norris went away empty-handed, feeling hampered by a lack of expertise in Persian on the part of his interpreter Adiell Mill. He left the camp, which he had followed to Mandangad, on 5 November 1701. He was then held up in Burhanpur.

In February 1702 Aurangzeb sent Norris at Burhanpur a letter, and a sword for King William, with a promise that, after all, the firmans would be sent. On 9 February the ambassador resumed his journey, and arrived on 12 March in the neighbourhood of Surat. He immediately entered upon an acrimonious dispute with Sir Nicholas Waite, to whose actions he ascribed the failure of the mission.

=== Death ===
On 5 May 1702 Norris sailed for England in the Scipio, while his brother Edward and suite embarked in the China Merchant, with a cargo valued at 87,200 rupees on Norris's account, and sixty thousand rupees belonging to the company. At Mauritius the two ships met on 11 July, but soon afterwards the Scipio parted company, and when she came to St. Helena it was reported that Norris had been attacked with dysentery, and had died at sea on 10 October 1702. He was married, to the widow of a Pollexfen, but left no issue.

== Notes ==
Parliament of England
Preceded by Thomas Brotherton and Jasper Maudit	Member of Parliament for Liverpool; 1695 – Dec. 1701; With: Jasper Maudit to 1698; William Clayton from 1698	Succeeded by Sir Thomas Johnson and William Clayton
Baronetage of England
New creation	Baronet (of Speke); 1698–1702	Extinct
