= Matthew Gray =

Matthew Gray is the name of:

- Matthew Gray (archer) (born 1973), Australian archer
- Matthew Gray (cyclist) (born 1977), Australian Paralympic cyclist
- Matthew Gray (Governor of Bombay), acting governor of Bombay, 1669–1672

== See also ==
- Matt Gray (disambiguation)
