= John Gayer (lord mayor) =

English merchant (1584–1649)

John Gayer (or Gayre; baptised 1584; died 20 July 1649) was an English merchant who was Lord Mayor of London in 1646.

== Life ==
He was born in Plymouth and baptised in 1584. He was the eldest son of John Gayer senior, a merchant, and Margaret Trelawney. Both his parents were Cornish by birth: the Gayer family came originally from Liskeard.

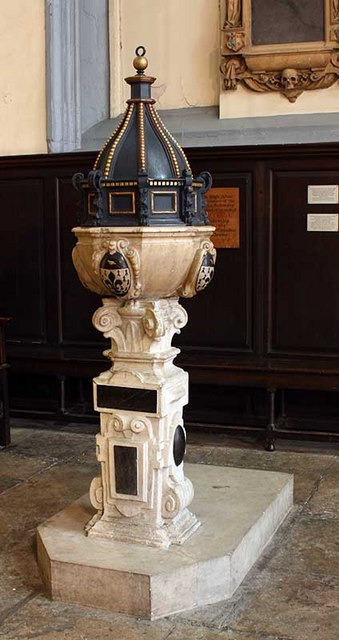
The font at St Katharine Cree with Gayer's arms

Gayer moved to London, and at one stage of his career spent some years in Syria, where a strange event later led him to institute the Lion sermon. He became a city of London merchant and a member of the Worshipful Company of Fishmongers. He was one of the Court Assistants from 1617 to 1618, from 1622 to 1623, and from 1624 to 1626. He was a member of the committee of the East India Company from 1626 to 1635 and was one of the Court Assistants from 1627 to 1630. In 1630, he became Treasurer of the Levant Company for two years. He was one of the Court Assistants from 1632 to 1636 and was a member of the committee of the East India Company from 1635 to 1636. He became Sheriff of London in 1635 for a year. On 27 October 1636 he was elected an alderman of the City of London for Aldgate ward. He was Prime Warden of the Fishmongers Company in 1638 and also became Colonel of the Trained Bands until 1642. In 1639 he was elected deputy governor of the East India Company. He was imprisoned in the Tower of London in May 1640 with three other aldermen – Nicholas Rainton, Thomas Soame and Thomas Atkins – for refusing to list the inhabitants of his ward who were able to contribute £50 or more to a loan for King Charles. He was a member of the committee of the East India Company from 1641 to 1649 and was knighted on 3 December 1641. In 1646, he was elected 310th Lord Mayor of London. He became president of Christ's Hospital in 1648.

He instituted the annual Lion sermon at St Katharine Cree Church, Leadenhall Street, London. The sermon was inspired by his time in the Syrian Desert, when a lion passed him by without attacking him, leading him to believe that he had had a miraculous deliverance. The sermon has traditionally been preached on the theme of 'challenges to the Christian faith'. Gayer endowed St Katharine Cree with a fund to preach the sermon, gave money to charities, and bought a baptismal font for the church inscribed with his coat of arms.

He married Katherine Hopkins, daughter of Sampson Hopkins of Coventry, by whom he had seven children. One of Gayer's daughters Katherine married Sir Robert Abdy, 1st Baronet, son of Anthony Abdy, Alderman and Sheriff. Another daughter Elizabeth married Francis Godolphin (1629–1670) and daughter Mary married Sir Andrew Henley, 1st Baronet. His nephew was Sir John Gayer, Governor of Bombay.

== Citations ==
Civic offices
Preceded by Sir Thomas Adams, 1st Baronet	Lord Mayor of the City of London; 1646	Succeeded by John Warner
