= Charles Boone (died 1819) =

English politician

Charles Boone (1729?–1819), of Barking Hall, Suffolk and Lee Place, Kent, was an English politician.

Boone was the son of Charles Boone of Rook's Nest, in Tandridge, and Godstone, Surrey. His second wife was Mary Evelyn, widow of George Evelyn of Godstone, and daughter of Lt.-Col. Thomas Garth of Harrold, Bedfordshire.

He was a Member (MP) of the Parliament of England for Castle Rising from 25 February 1757 to 1768, for Ashburton in 1768–84 and for Castle Rising in 1784–96.
