= Governor Hodges =

Governor Hodges may refer to:

- George H. Hodges (1866–1947), 19th Governor of Kansas (1913–1915)
- Thomas Hodges (Governor of Bombay) (died 1771). Governor of Bombay from 27 January 1767 to 23 February 1771
- Luther H. Hodges (1898–1974), Governor of North Carolina
- Jim Hodges (born November 19, 1956) Governor of South Carolina from 1999 until 2003
