= Governor Law =

Governor Law may refer to:

- Stephen Law (Governor of Bombay) (1699–1787), Governor of Bombay from 1739 to 1742
- Edward Law, 1st Earl of Ellenborough (1790–1871), Governor-General of India from 1842 to 1844
- Jonathan Law (1674–1750), 27th Governor of the Colony of Connecticut from 1741 to 1750
