= Governor Griffith =

Governor Griffith may refer to:

- John Griffith (Governor of Bombay), Governor of Bombay in 1795
- Ralph Griffith (governor) (1882–1963), Governor of the North-West Frontier Province from 1932 to 1937
