= Ann Doherty =

English novelist and playwright, c. 1786 – c. 1831/1832

Ann Doherty (c. 1786 – c. 1831/1832) was an English novelist and playwright, who corresponded with Robert Southey. Her father, Thomas Holmes (1751–1827), was a wealthy East India merchant from Worcestershire, who changed his name to Hunter on inheriting an estate, Gobions in North Mymms, Hertfordshire, through his wife, the daughter of the Governor of Bombay, William Hornby.

== Relationships ==
Ann Holmes, said to have "a very superior intellect" and much wealth as a child, wrote at the age of 15 a number of excited love letters and verses to Hugh Doherty, an Irish ex-dragoon, who was twice her age when they married. However, she left him and their baby in 1806, after which Hugh Doherty published a book entitled The Discovery, which included her letters and related that they had eloped after Ann's parents had confined her in a private madhouse.

In 1811, Hugh Doherty brought a successful action against the architect Philip William Wyatt (died 1835) for "criminal conversation" with his wife, but received only £1000 in damages, not the £20,000 he had claimed. Her relationship with Wyatt was over by 1818, when she was calling herself Ann Attersoll, presumably referring to cohabitation with the wealthy merchant and banker John Attersoll (c. 1784–1822), who had briefly been a Whig MP for Wootton Bassett in 1812–1813.

By 1820, Ann Doherty was living under the name St Anne Holmes in France, where she remained.

== Writings ==
As an author, Ann Doherty published anonymously or as "St Anne". Her novels "tended towards an Ossianic, flowery style" with heroines of "a high degree of feminine softness". They included Ronaldsha (1808), The Castles of Wolfnorth and Mont Eagle (1812) and The Knight of the Glen. An Irish Romance (1815).

While with Attersoll, she began corresponding with the Lake Poet Robert Southey. In 1818 she sent him a copy of her Peter the Cruel King of Castile and Leon: An Historical Play in Five Acts. He responded with a dedicated copy of the 1821 French translation of his Roderick the Last of the Goths.

== External sites ==
- Corvey Women Writers on the Web author page
