= Charles Bourchier (governor) =

Governor of Madras from 1767 to 1770

Governor of Madras
- In office 25 January 1767 – 31 January 1770
- Preceded by: Sir Robert Palk, 1st Baronet
- Succeeded by: Josias Du Pre

Personal details
- Died: 1810

Charles Bourchier (died 1810) was an official of the East India Company and was Governor of Madras from 1767 to 1770.

Bourchier was the elder son of Richard Bourchier, Governor of Bombay and his wife Sarah Hawkins, daughter of George Hawkins, of Clayhill, Epsom, Surrey. He joined the service of the East India Company. Bourchier was appointed Governor of Madras on 25 January 1767. He held the post until 31 January 1770.

Bourchier married Anne Foley, daughter of Thomas Foley, M.P. for Herefordshire, on 6 May 1776. In about 1783 he purchased Colney House at Shenley, Hertfordshire, and built a mansion at a cost of about £53,000. He served as High Sheriff of Hertfordshire in 1788. He sold Colney House before 1795.

Bourchier died at the age of 82, on 2 February 1810. His widow died aged 80 at Hadham, Hertfordshire on 14 May 1814.

Political offices
Preceded by Robert Palk	Governor of Madras; 1767–1770	Succeeded by Josias Du Pré
