= John Holkell =

English governmental functionary

Sir John Holkell (died 28 June 1771) was an English governmental functionary. He was the Acting Governor of Bombay for a short time at the start of 1760; he was relieved of his command by the arrival of Charles Crommelin on 28 February 1760.

Holkell married Mary Bray (1722–1801) in October 1746; they had no children. He died at Bombay on 28 June 1771. He was buried at St. Thomas's in the Fort.

Political offices
Preceded by Richard Bourchier	Governor of Bombay; 1760	Succeeded by Charles Crommelin
