= Thomas Johnson (Liverpool merchant) =

English merchant and politician

Sir Thomas Johnson (27 October 1664 – 28 December 1728) was an English merchant and politician who sat in the English and British House of Commons from 1701 to 1723.

Johnson was born in Liverpool in 1664. Left a considerable fortune by his father, he traded as a merchant with the British colonies in North America; he was particularly involved in the slavery, tobacco and sugar trades. He is recognised as one of the earliest recorded slave traders in Liverpool. In 1715, he transported 130 Jacobite prisoners to plantations in the Americas. He also played an important role in the emergence of the rock salt industry in Cheshire.

Johnson succeeded his father in 1689 as bailiff of Liverpool and in 1695 as mayor. He effected the separation of Liverpool from the parish of Walton-on-the-Hill in 1699 and obtained from the Crown a grant to the Corporation of the site of the old castle, where he planned the town market. He was the chief promoter of the construction of the world's first commercial wet Old dock 1708 and steered a bill through Parliament to authorise it. In addition, the building of St Peter's and St George's churches (both now demolished) were due in great measure to his efforts. From 1701 to 1723 he was Member of Parliament for Liverpool, sitting as a Whig. He was knighted by Queen Anne in 1708.

In 1723, having lost in speculation the fortune which he had inherited from his father, he retired from Parliament and was appointed collector of customs on the Rappahannock River in Virginia. Many sources suggest that he went out to Virginia himself, and died in Jamaica in 1729, but Hayton et al.'s recently published volume in the authoritative History of Parliament series contradicts this, stating that he either never took up the post or exercised it through a deputy, and that he died in lodgings at Charing Cross on 28 December 1728.

A Liverpool street is named Sir Thomas Street after him.

Parliament of England
Preceded by William Clayton; Sir William Norris	Member of Parliament for Liverpool; December 1701–1707; With: William Clayton	Succeeded by Parliament of Great Britain
Parliament of Great Britain
Preceded by Parliament of England	Member of Parliament for Liverpool; 1707–1723; With: William Clayton 1707–08; Richard Norris 1708–1710; John Cleiveland 1710–13; William Clayton 1713–15; Edward Norris 1715–22; William Cleiveland 1722–23	Succeeded by William Cleiveland; Langham Booth
