= Charles Boone (governor) =

British colonial governor (died 1735)

Charles Boone (died 1735), of Rook's Nest, in Tandridge, and Godstone, Surrey, was an East India Company officer and politician who sat in the House of Commons from 1727 and 1734. He was a British governor of the Bombay Presidency from 1715 to 1722.

Boone was the son of Thomas Boone of St. Andrew Undershaft, London, merchant, and his wife Sarah Finch of St. Botolph's, Bishopsgate, London. He joined the service of the East India Company before 1710, when he was at Fort St. George. He married Jane Chardin, daughter of Daniel Chardin merchant of Fort St. George, India, and France. She died on 28 November 1710. On 26 December 1715, he took office as Governor of Bombay. As governor, he implemented Gerald Aungier's plans for the fortification of the island, and had walls built from Dongri in the north to Mendham's point in the south. He established the Marine force, and constructed the St. Thomas Cathedral in 1718, which was the first Anglican Church in Bombay. He returned to England after his governorship finished on 9 January 1722.

Boone was returned unopposed as Member of Parliament for Ludgershall at the 1727 British general election. In 1729 he became a Director of the East India Company. In Parliament, he voted against the Administration on the civil list arrears in 1729 and the Hessians in 1730, and was absent from the other recorded divisions. At the 1734 British general election he stood down from his seat, where he was succeeded by his eldest son Daniel Boone.

Boone married, as his second wife, Mary Evelyn, widow of George Evelyn of Godstone, and daughter of Lt.-Col. Thomas Garth of Harrold, Bedfordshire on 8 August 1727. He died on 8 October 1735 leaving a son Daniel by his first wife and three sons including Charles by his second wife.

Government offices
Preceded by Stephen Strutt	Governor of Bombay; 1715 - 1722	Succeeded by William Phipps
Parliament of Great Britain
Preceded by Anthony Cornish; Borlase Richmond Webb	Member of Parliament for Ludgershall; 1727–1734; With: Borlase Richmond Webb	Succeeded by Peter Delmé; Daniel Boone
