= Charles Crommelin =

British Governor of Bombay

Charles Crommelin (1717–1788) was a Governor of Bombay during the British Raj from 1760 to 1767.

Crommelin was born in Bombay, where his father, Marc Anthony Crommelin was a factor for the British East India Company. Charles first joined the staff of the East India Company in 1733.

== Sources ==
- Article on Crommelin by Richard Pugh

Political offices
Preceded by John Holkell	Governor of Bombay; 1760–1767	Succeeded by Thomas Hodges
