= Matt Gray =

Matt Gray may refer to:

- Matt Gray (footballer, born 1907) (1907–1985), English footballer
- Matt Gray (footballer, born 1936) (1936–2016), Scottish footballer who emigrated to South Africa
- Matt Gray (politician) (born c. 1980), American politician, member of the Colorado House of Representatives
- Matt Gray (footballer, born 1981), English footballer and football manager for Sutton United
- Matt Gray, songwriter of the Dannii Minogue song "All I Wanna Do" and many other songs
- Natalie Gray (formerly Matt Gray), YouTuber and member of The Technical Difficulties

== See also ==
- Matthew Gray (disambiguation)
