= Daniel Annesley =

English governor of Bombay (fl. 1694)

Daniel Annesley was an English governor of the Bombay Presidency in the days of the Honourable East India Company.

Annesley assumed the office on 10 May 1694 and left office on 17 May 1694.

Government offices
Preceded by Bartholomew Harris	Governor of Bombay; 1694	Succeeded by John Gayer
