= Lion sermon =

Annual sermon preached in London

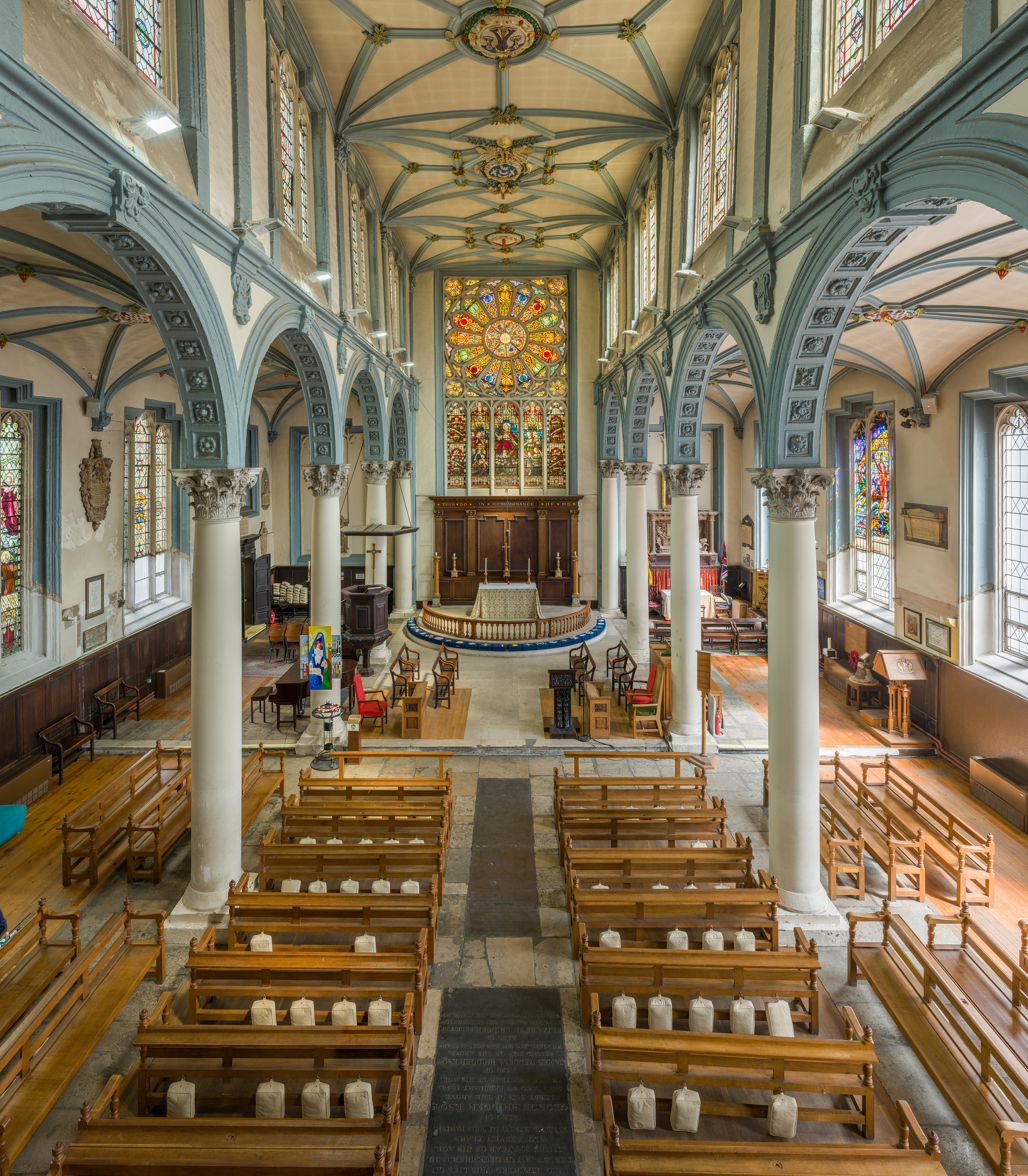
St Katharine Cree, where the sermon is preached

The Lion sermon is an annual sermon preached on 16 October at St Katharine Cree in the City of London. The sermon has traditionally been preached on the theme of 'challenges to the Christian faith'.

Sir John Gayer, Lord Mayor of London (died 20 July 1649) instituted the Lion sermon at St Katharine Cree. The sermon was inspired by his time in the Syrian desert, when a lion passed him without attacking him, leading him to believe that he had had a miraculous deliverance. In gratitude Gayer endowed St Katharine Cree with a fund to preach a sermon in memory of this event, gave money to charities, and bought a baptismal font for the church inscribed with his coat of arms.

In 2013, Shami Chakrabarti, Director of Liberty, was the first woman in 371 years to give the Lion sermon. She named the three pillars of Liberty as Dignity, Equality and Fairness.
