= Lucas baronets =

Set index for Lucas baronets

There have been two baronetcies created for persons with the surname Lucas: one in the Baronetage of England and one in the Baronetage of the United Kingdom. As of 2026 the latter is extant.

- Lucas baronets of Fenton (1644): see Sir Gervase Lucas, 1st Baronet (1611–1667)
- Lucas baronets of Ashtead Park and Lowestoft (1887)
