= George Dick (governor of Bombay) =

British Governor of Bombay

George Dick (1739 – 9 May 1818) was the Governor of Bombay from 26 November 1792 to 9 November 1795.

== Life ==
Dick became a writer for the East India Company in 1759. At the time of his death he "had never been out of Bombay, except for an occasional trip to Bancoot, for nearly sixty years". There is a tablet to his memory in St. Thomas Cathedral, Mumbai.

Political offices
Preceded by Robert Abercromby	Governor of Bombay; 1792–1795	Succeeded by John Griffith
