= Stephen Strutt =

British governor

Stephen Strutt was the former governor of Mumbai during the British Raj. He assumed the office on 11 October 1715. He left office on 26 December 1715.

Government offices
Preceded by William Aislabie	Governor of Bombay; 11 October 1715 - 26 December 1715	Succeeded by Charles Boone
