= John Horne (governor of Bombay) =

British politician

John Horne (died 1755) was the Governor of Bombay from 22 September 1734 to 7 April 1739.

Government offices
Preceded by Robert Cowan	Governor of Bombay; 1734 – 1739	Succeeded by Stephen Law
