= Worli creek =

Creek in Mumbai, India

Worli creek is a creek located in the Worli suburb of Mumbai, India. The Hornby Vellard project was started to block the Worli creek and prevent the low-lying areas of Bombay from being flooded at high tide.

A lot of encroachments have taken place and the newspaper, The Times of India has exposed them with a series of articles in 2021.
