= James Farish =

British politician

James Farish was the acting governor of Bombay during the British Raj from 11 July 1838 to 31 May 1839. He was a member of the Bombay council, and acted as an interim Governor.

Farish was an evangelical Christian and friend of John Wilson. His time in office was marked by a dispute with the Parsis. He had previously acted as Revenue Secretary, and left India in 1841.

In a minute issued by the Bombay Presidency in 1838, Farish wrote that Indian people "must either be kept down by a sense of our power, or they must willingly submit from a conviction that we are more wise, more just, more humane, and more anxious to improve their condition than any other rulers they could possibly have." The literary critic and historian Gauri Viswanathan has described this passage as one that "spell[s] out in the most chilling terms" the nature of the political choices faced by the British administration and the political significance that the British ascribed to cultural assimilation.

Preceded by Robert Grant	Acting Governor of Bombay; 1838–1839	Succeeded by James Rivett-Carnac
