= Edward Norris (physician) =

English physician

Arms of Norris of Speke, blazoned: Quarterly argent and gules, in the second and third quarters a fret or, over all a fess azure.

Edward Norris, FRS, FRCP (bapt. 19 April 1665 – 22 July 1726) was an English physician and parliamentarian. He was the secretary of an embassy from the East India Company to the Mogul Empire in 1701, and an MP for Liverpool from 1715 to 1722. The family name is sometimes spelt Norres or Norreys.

== Life ==
=== Origins ===
Edward Norris was descended from a distinguished family, who had represented Liverpool in Parliament almost continuously since the Revolution. Some sources say he was born in 1663, though he was baptised at Childwall, Lancashire on 19 April 1665. He was the fifth son of Thomas Norris (c. 1618–1686) of Speke, Lancashire, and his wife, Katherine (born 1632), daughter of Sir Henry Garway (Garraway). He was the younger brother of Thomas Norris and Sir William Norris.

Edward graduated BA from Brasenose College, Oxford, in 1686, and proceeded MA in 1689, MB in 1691, and MD in 1695. He practised medicine at Chester; his scientific reputation is attested by the fact that he was a Fellow of the Royal Society as early 1698

=== India ===
In 1699, he was chosen by the new East India Company to accompany his brother, Sir William Norris, as secretary of his embassy to the Mogul Emperor. He visited the camp of Aurangazíb in the Deccan from April to November 1701. On 28 April 1701, he entered the Mogul's camp at Parnella 'in a rich palanquin, bearing his Majesty's letters to the Emperor'. He sailed for England in September 1702, bringing with him a cargo valued at 147,000 rupees, 60,000 rupees of which belonged to the Company and 87,000 to his brother.

=== Later life ===
After an interval of mental or physical illness caused by the hardships of the journey, Norris resumed the profession of medicine at Utkinton, Cheshire, and was elected a Fellow of the Royal College of Physicians in 1716. He was returned unopposed as a Whig for Liverpool in 1715, and voted with the Government on the Septennial Bill, but against them on the repeal of the Occasional Conformity and Schism Acts and the Peerage Bill. He did not stand in 1722.

He died on 22 July 1726, and was buried at St. Michael's Chapel, attached to Garston Hall, a manor of the Norris family, near Speke. He is there commemorated:

Under this tomb lies interred
Eᴅᴡᴀʀᴅ Nᴏʀʀɪs, M.D., of Speek,
who departed this life 22 July 1726,
in the year of his age.
Also Aɴɴ, his wife
died y^{e} 3 of January, 1729, aged 53.

=== Marriage and issue ===
In 1705, he married Ann (1675/6–1729), daughter of William Cleveland of Liverpool, by whom he left one son, with whose death, some time before 1736, the family of the Norrises of Speke in the male line became extinct.

== Achievement ==
- Arms: as before.—Quarterly, argent and gules; a fesse, azure. In the second and third quarters, a fret, or.
- Crest: as allowed in 1664, on a wreath a mount vert, an erne or eagle, wings elevated, proper.

== See also ==
- Speke Hall
