= William Clayton (Liverpool MP) =

English slave-trader and merchant

William Clayton (after 1650 – 7 July 1715) was an English merchant and politician from Liverpool.

He was the son of Robert Clayton of Fulwood, near Preston, Lancashire and followed his uncle Thomas Clayton to Liverpool, where he became a successful tobacco and sugar merchant. After serving as a common councillor from 1685 he was elected Mayor of Liverpool for 1689–90, and then became an alderman of the city.

In the Parliament of England, he served as a Member of Parliament (MP) for Liverpool from 1698 to 1708. In 1701 he changed his allegiance from the Whigs to the Tories. After the Union with Scotland, he was elected as a Liverpool MP to the new House of Commons of Great Britain from 1713 to 1715.

He married, in 1690, Elizabeth, the daughter of George Leigh of Oughtrington, Cheshire and left a son and 3 daughters.

The vessel Liverpool Merchant, that he jointly owned with John Earle, bound Liverpool's fortunes to the triangular trade. Sailing on the 16 October 1699, under Captain William Webster, for Africa, bartering for 275 slaves, and offloading 220 survivors in Barbados, on 18 September 1700, before sailing for Liverpool, with a cargo of tobacco and sugar, on 24 October 1700, as the first known ship of Liverpool to enter the Atlantic trade.

Parliament of England
Preceded by Sir William Norris, Bt; Jasper Maudit	Member of Parliament for Liverpool; 1698 – 1707; With: Sir William Norris, Bt to 1701; Thomas Johnson from 1701	Succeeded by Parliament of Great Britain
Parliament of Great Britain
Preceded by Parliament of England	Member of Parliament for Liverpool; 1707 – 1708; With: Thomas Johnson	Succeeded by Thomas Johnson; Richard Norris
Preceded by Sir Thomas Johnson; John Cleiveland	Member of Parliament for Liverpool; 1713 – 1715; With: Sir Thomas Johnson	Succeeded by Sir Thomas Johnson; Edward Norris
