= Bartholomew Harris =

English governor

Bartholomew Harris (died at Surat on 10 May 1694) was an English governor in India. After Sir John Child, 1st Baronet was appointed governor of Bombay in May 1687, Harris assumed the former office of Child as president of the English factory in Surat. After Child's death on 4 February 1690, Harris also assumed the Bombay presidency, even though he chose to stay in Surat, where he died on 10 May 1694. Harris was buried at the English Cemetery north of Surat near the Variav Gate, where his tomb is still to be found. Harris was buried next to his wife Arabella, who had died in 1686 at the age of eighteen. Both their names are inscribed on a stone marker inside the pavilion-like construction on top of their graves.

Government offices
Preceded by Sir John Child, 1st Baronet	Governor of Bombay; 4 February 1690 – 10 May 1694	Succeeded by Daniel Annesley
