= Abraham Shipman =

English diplomat and governor

Sir Abraham Shipman was an Englishman appointed as governor of Bombay during the period of the East India Company. He assumed the office in March 1662 and died in office in October 1664, but did not gain possession of Bombay.

On 19 March 1662, Shipman was appointed the first Governor and General of the city of Bombay, and his fleet arrived there in about September or October 1662. On being asked to hand over Bombay and Salsette to the English, the Portuguese governor contended that the island of Bombay alone had been ceded, and on the ground of some alleged irregularity in the form of the letters patent, he refused to give up even Bombay. The Viceroy of Portuguese India declined to interfere, and Shipman was prevented from landing in Bombay. He died on the island of Anjediva in North Canara in October 1664.

Government offices
New creation	Governor of Bombay; 19 March 1662 – October 1664	Succeeded by Humphrey Cooke
