= Henry Gary =

English governor

Captain Henry Gary was an English governor of Bombay during the period that Bombay was a Crown Colony of England prior to the rule of the East India Company.

== Life ==
He assumed office as governor of Bombay on 22 May 1667 and left office on 23 September 1668. He raised the general revenues of Bombay island, enlarged its land-forces, mounted artillery on substantial carriages, and improved the fortifications of the island.

Some claimed Gary was of either Venetian or Greek origin. He became governor on the death of his predecessor Sir Gervase Lucas. Gary had a house in Goa. Gary was replaced as governor by George Oxenden, the first East India Company governor of Bombay.

Gary was unusual in staying in Bombay with his family after passing on the Governorship. No other prominent Englishman did so in this period. He later came into conflict with Governor Gerald Aungier, which eventually led to Gary's arrest on 27 June and trial on 6 July 1674. Despite this, he continued to live in Bombay and eventually was restored in the company's favour. In 1678 he was made Chief Justice of Bombay. He was still alive in 1689 during Yakut Khan's invasion of Bombay. After the invasion he was accused of assisting the enemy and his lands were seized by the company. He was dead by 1695, when his son was petitioning for the return of the seized lands.

== Sources ==
- John Keay. The Honorable Company: A History of the English East India Company. New York: Macmillan, 1991. pp. 133–136.
- British Library, Bombay Factory Records, G/3/1

Government offices
Preceded by Gervase Lucas	Governor of Bombay; 22 May 1667 – 23 September 1668	Succeeded by George Oxenden
