= Humphrey Cooke =

English governor

Humphrey Cooke, known in Portuguese chronicles as Inofre Coque, was the first English governor of the Bombay Presidency during the rule of the Honourable East India Company.

Cooke completed negotiations for the Portuguese surrender of Bombay, begun by Sir Abraham Shipman, and assumed office as governor on 18 February 1665, after being conveyed to Bombay by three East India Company ships. According to Professor Shafaat Ahmad Khan, Cooke "took himself personally the possession and delivery of the said port and town of Bombay, walking thereupon, taking in his hand earth and stones, entering and walking upon its bastions, putting his hands to the walls thereof, and making all other like acts which in right were necessary without any impediment or contradiction."

Cooke left office on 5 November 1666, and his treaty was subsequently repudiated by King Charles II. He acquired Mahim, Sion, Dharavi, and Wadala for the English from the Portuguese.

Government offices
Preceded by Abraham Shipman	Governor of Bombay; February 1665 – 5 November 1666	Succeeded by Gervase Lucas
