= Nicholas Waite =

Governor of Bombay

Sir Nicholas Waite (died c. 1715) was an English governor of Bombay during the period of the East India Company.

Waite assumed the office of Governor of Bombay on 17 November 1704 and left office in September 1708.

He died about 1715.

Government offices
Preceded by John Gayer	Governor of Bombay; 1704 – 1708	Succeeded by William Aislabie
