= William Aislabie (governor) =

British governor of Bombay (1671–1725)

William Aislabie (3 December 1671 – 10 November 1725) was a British governor of the Bombay Presidency during the days of the East India Company.

== Life ==
Aislabie was the fifth son of George Aislabie, of Studley Royal, and brother of John Aislabie. He was deputy Governor from 1704, following the death of John Burniston. He assumed the post of Governor in September 1708 and left office on 11 October 1715. He served as Member of Parliament for Ripon from the end of 1719 to 1722.

At the end of his life, his brother John Aislabie bought the Waverley Abbey estate from the Coldham family and set about building a house there for him. Unfortunately William died around the time the house was ready and the Waverley estate was sold.

== Family ==
Aislabie married a daughter of John Burniston. Their son William married in 1728 Elizabeth Scattergood, daughter of the merchant John Scattergood. The army officer John Aislabie (born 1729) was their son.

Government offices
Preceded by Nicholas Waite	Governor of Bombay; 1708 - 1715	Succeeded by Stephen Strutt
Parliament of Great Britain
Preceded by John Aislabie; The Viscount Castlecomer	Member of Parliament for Ripon; 1719–1722; With: John Aislabie; William Aislabie II	Succeeded by William Aislabie II; John Scrope
