= Barking Hall =

Coordinates: 52.1408°N 1.0325°E

Barking Hall is a lost country house in Barking, Suffolk, England. It was demolished in 1926.

The hall was built in the 18th century with a 7-bay frontage with a tower and later wings. It had a long verandah on the entrance front.

== History ==
The Crown sold the manor of Barking to Sir Francis Needham. It later passed in the 1600s to the Theobald family, then the Crowley family, who were wealthy ironmasters, and then by marriage to the Earls of Ashburnham c.1756. The final Hall was built by the Ashburnham family in place of the old manor house, but was demolished in 1926 apart from the stable block, which was converted to a private house.
