= John Griffith (governor of Bombay) =

British Governor of Bombay

John Griffith was Governor of Bombay from 9 November 1795 to 27 December 1795.

Political offices
Preceded by George Dick	Governor of Bombay; 1795	Succeeded by Jonathan Duncan
