= Gervase Lucas =

English soldier and governor

Sir Gervase Lucas, 1st Baronet (1611–1667) was an English soldier and governor of Bombay under King Charles II.

He fought as a Royalist in the First English Civil War and commanded a garrison at Belvoir Castle which he had seized in January 1643 until the castle surrendered after a siege in February 1646.

Lucas assumed the office of Governor of Bombay on 5 November 1666 and died in office on 21 May 1667. He built a garrison on the island having a reinforcement of 60 men under a lieutenant, together with a supply of clothes, ammunition and stores, and a small vessel. Lucas had his predecessor in office Humphrey Cooke jailed for extortion while in office. After Cooke escaped and went to aid the Portuguese he was charged with treason.

The Lucas Baronetcy, of Fenton in the County of Lincoln, was created in the Baronetage of England on 20 May 1644 for Gervase Lucas. The title became extinct on his death.

== Sources ==
- John Keay. The Honorable Company: A History of the English East India Company. New York: Macmillan, 1991. p. 133.

Government offices
Preceded by Humphrey Cooke	Governor of Bombay; 5 November 1666 – 21 May 1667	Succeeded by Henry Gary
Baronetage of England
New creation	Baronet (of Fenton); 1644–1667	Extinct
