= Stephen Law (governor of Bombay) =

British Governor of Bombay

Governor of Bombay
- In office 7 April 1739 – 15 November 1742

Stephen Law (1699 – 25 December 1787) was the Governor of Bombay from 7 April 1739 to 15 November 1742.

Law was born into a merchant family and became an East India Company writer in Bombay in 1715, graduating in 1720 to become a factor.

In 1739, he was appointed Governor. He was recalled in 1742 following accusations of excessive expenditure in protecting the settlement from the Marathas. He retired to Broxbourne Manor, Broxbourne, England and became a Director of the Company for 1746–49, 1751–54, and 1756.

After his wife died in January 1785, he moved to Goudhurst in Kent.

== Death ==
He died in 1787 at Bedgbury House, Kent, the home of his son-in-law. His daughter Stephana had married John Cartier, the ex-Governor of Bengal. His son, John Law, became the Archdeacon of Rochester.

Political offices
Preceded by John Horne	Governor of Bombay; 1739–1742	Succeeded by John Geekie
