= William Hornby (governor) =

English governor

William Hornby (baptised 11 March 1723, Snaith, died 18 November 1803, The Hook, near Titchfield, Hampshire) was an English Governor of Bombay from 1771 to 1784.

== Governorship ==
William Hornby joined the East India Company as a writer (clerk) in 1740, and rose to become Governor of Bombay in 1771. As Governor of Bombay, he is best remembered by the Vellard north of Cumballa Hill which was constructed at his behest against the wishes of the British East India Company. One of the first large works of civil engineering in the city, it transformed the geography of the islands by opening up the low-lying marshy areas of Mahalaxmi and Kamathipura for inhabitation on its completion in 1784. He was also the first governor to move his official residence from the Fort area to Parel. In a sense, this was also to change the demographics of the city by starting a northward move.

An intriguing dead-end of information is the statement attributed to John Murray, that "The Hornby diamond, brought from the East Indies by the Hon. William Hornby, Governor of Bombay, in 1775, weighs 36 carats [7.2 g], and is now, I believe, the property of the Shah of Persia."

== Return ==
William Hornby returned to England in 1783, when the government granted him land near Titchfield, South Hampshire. He set out to build a country mansion, which he called The Hook, built in the style of the Government House in Bombay and removed the remains of a medieval village to create a parkland for himself. His country house was completed in 1790, at a cost of over £12,000. He died there in 1803.

One of Hornby's grandchildren, through his daughter, was the novelist and playwright Ann Doherty.

Political offices
Preceded by Thomas Hodges	Governor of Bombay; 1771–1784	Succeeded by Rawson Hart Boddam
