= Richard Bourchier =

British Governor of Bombay and official

Richard Bourchier was an official of the East India Company and was Governor of Bombay from 1750 to 1760.

Bourchier was probably born in Ireland, the son of Charles Bourchier and his wife Barbara Harrison, daughter of Richard Harrison of Balls, Hertfordshire and MP for Lancaster. He entered the service of the East India Company and became Resident at Surat. He was the Governor of Bombay from 1750 to 1760. There he was responsible for the foundation of the English church and was a major contributor to its support.

Bourchier was the father of Charles Bourchier later Governor of Madras.

Political offices
Preceded by William Wake	Governor of Bombay; 1750–1760	Succeeded by John Holkell
