= Charles Ward (deputy governor of Bombay) =

Deputy governor of Bombay from 1682 to 1683

Charles Ward was the deputy governor of Bombay from 1682 to 1683. He was appointed to the office by his brother-in-law John Child with the intention that he should reduce the costs of operations for the East India Company in Bombay (now Mumbai). The prospect of reduced pay was not liked by the troops so they revolted and imprisoned Ward and declared Richard Keigwin their new governor.
