= St Katharine Cree =

Anglican church in London, United Kingdom

Coordinates: 51°30′48.28″N 0°4′44.88″W

- Guild Church of Saint Katharine Cree
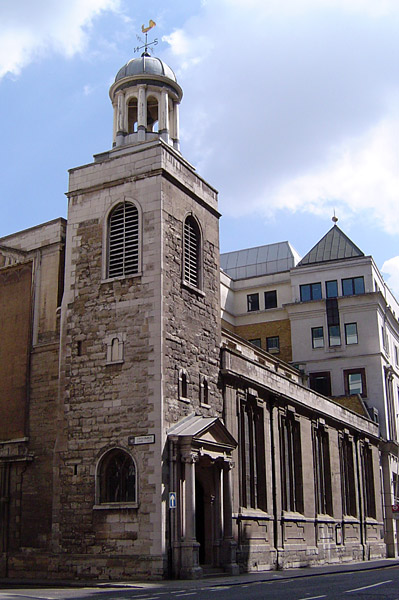
- View from the southwest, showing the 16th century tower

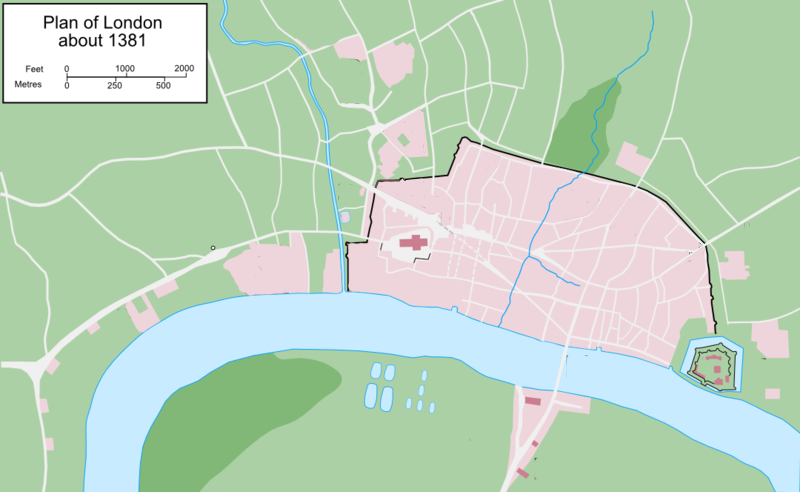
- OS grid reference: TQ33398114
- Location: 86 Leadenhall Street, City of London, EC2
- Country: England
- Language(s): English and Spanish
- Denomination: Church of England
- Previous denomination: Roman Catholic (to 1538)
- Website: stkatharinecree.org

History
- Founded: 1280
- Founder: Eustace
- Dedication: Catherine of Alexandria
- Dedicated: 31 January 1631

Architecture
- Heritage designation: Grade I listed building
- Architect: Inigo Jones
- Style: Jacobean
- Years built: 1628–30

Administration
- Diocese: London

The Guild Church of St Katharine Cree is an Anglican church in the Aldgate ward of the City of London, on the north side of Leadenhall Street near Leadenhall Market. It was founded in 1280. The present building dates from 1628 to 1630. Formerly a parish church, it is now a guild church.

== History ==
=== Former building ===
The parish served by the church existed by 1108, when it was served by the Augustinian Holy Trinity Priory, also called Christ Church, which was founded by Maud, queen at the time of King Henry I. The parishioners used the priory church but this proved unsatisfactory and disruptive to the priory's activities.

The prior partly resolved the problem in 1280 by founding St Katharine Cree as a separate church for the parishioners. The site of the present church was originally in the priory's churchyard and it is possible that the church began as a cemetery chapel. It took its name from the priory, "Cree" being abstracted from forms like Crichurch, which were abbreviations of "Christ Church" (H.A. Harben, A Dictionary of London (1918)). It was initially served by a canon appointed by the prior but this did not prove satisfactory either, so, in 1414, the church was established as a parish church in its own right. The present tower was added about 1504.

Describing the building at the end of the 16th century, John Stow wrote:

this church seemeth to be very old; since the building whereof the high street hath been so often raised by pavements that now men are fain to descend into the said church by divers steps, seven in number.

=== Current building ===
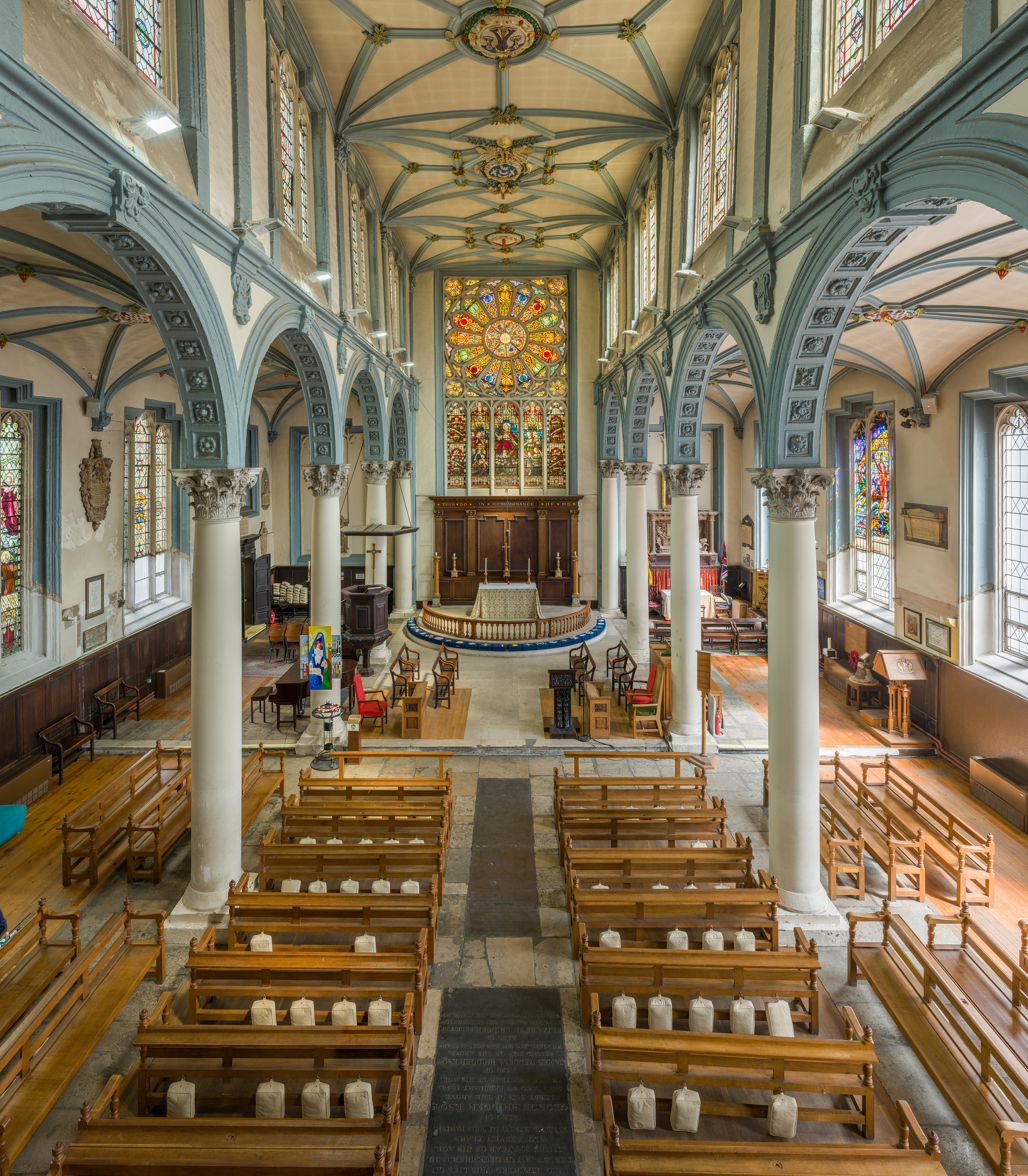
Inside the nave of St Katharine Cree, looking east to the altar

The present church was built in 1628–30, retaining the Tudor tower of its predecessor. It is larger than the previous church, incorporating a piece of ground previously occupied by a cloister on the north side, and the floor level is considerably higher. The rebuilt church was consecrated by William Laud, Bishop of London on 31 January 1631. His vestments and the form of service that he used for the consecration were later held against him in his trial and conviction for heresy, when Puritans accused him of having displayed Catholic sympathies through his "bowings and cringings". He is commemorated by a chapel in the church.

The church escaped the Great Fire of London in 1666 and suffered only minor damage in the London Blitz of the Second World War. However, structural problems required extensive restoration in 1962. It is now one of the city's Guild churches.

St Katharine Cree is a significant church of the Jacobean period, a time when few new churches were built. It is the only Jacobean church to have survived in London. The identity of its architect is unknown. It has a high nave, linked with the narrow aisles by arcades supported on Corinthian columns. The church is 31 yards (28 m) long and 17 yards (16 m) wide; the height to the ceiling of the nave is 37 feet (11 m).

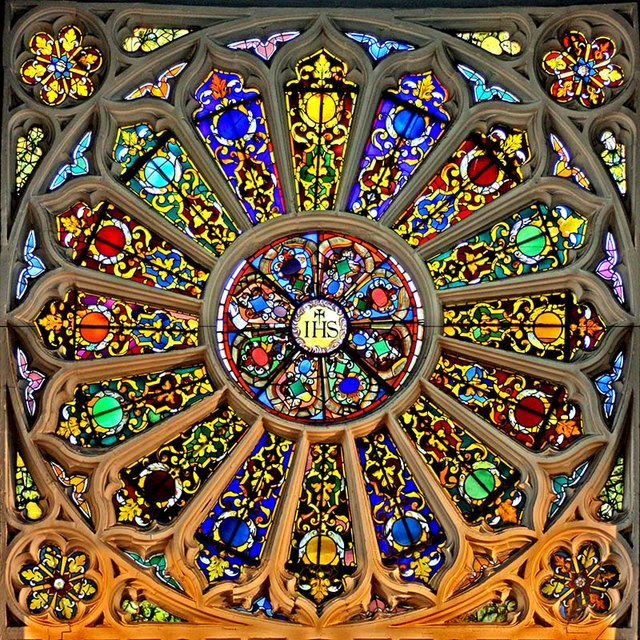
17th-century rose window

The chancel has a rose window, reputedly modelled on the much larger one in Old St Paul's Cathedral (destroyed in the Great Fire). The window and its stained glass are original, dating from 1630. The baptismal font dates from around 1640. The vaulted ceiling bears bosses of the arms of 16 of the city's livery companies and of the City of London itself. From the east end the bosses are:

- North Aisle – Mercers, Drapers, Skinners, Salters, Dyers and Pewterers
- Nave – The City of London, Fishmongers, Merchant Taylors, Ironmongers, Clothworkers and Leathersellers
- South Aisle – Grocers, Goldsmiths, Haberdashers, Vinters and Brewers

The present scheme dates mostly from the restoration of 1972. Tradition says that these Companies used St Katharine Cree for a time after the Great Fire of London of 1666, while their own Guild Churches were being rebuilt.

The church is a Grade I listed building.

By the south wall of St Katharine's is a memorial to RMS Lancastria, a troopship sunk at sea with huge loss of life during the Second World War in 1940. It includes a model of the ship and the ship's bell.

St Katharine's has a ring of six bells. Lester and Pack of the Whitechapel Bell Foundry cast five of them including the treble bell in 1754. Thomas II Mears of the Whitechapel Bell Foundry cast the tenor bell in 1842. The church clock has a bell, also cast by Lester and Pack in 1754. In the summer of 2007 they were rung for the first time since 1880. An appeal to raise £60,000 to restore the bells to full ringing order was launched in November 2007, and the project was completed in 2009. It is the only tower in the City where the bells are rung from a ground-floor ringing chamber.

Today St Katharine's is a guild church and has no parish, and now serves workers in the City of London

== Notable people associated with the church ==
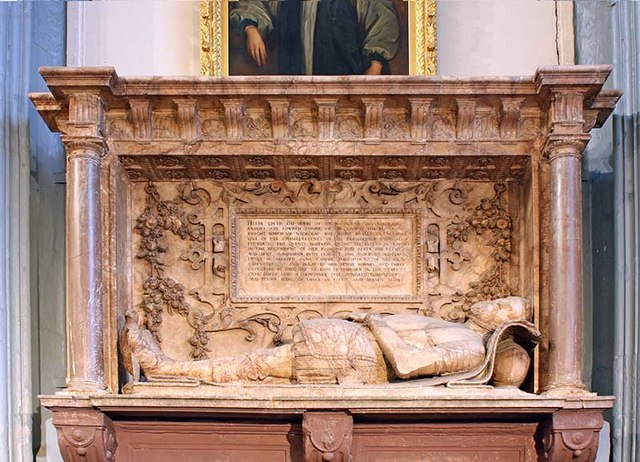
Sir Nicholas Throckmorton's monument

- Stephen Charnock (1628–80), Puritan Presbyterian clergyman and theologian, was born in the parish.
- Hans Holbein the Younger's grave (died 1543) has been claimed by both St Andrew Undershaft church and by St Katharine Cree. St Katharine Cree's claim is stronger because the nearby abbey had been recently destroyed, while St Andrew Undershaft's graveyard was already full.
- Both Henry Purcell and George Frideric Handel played the organ at the church.
- Sir Nicholas Throckmorton (died 1571), diplomat and ambassador, is buried in the church.

== See also ==
- Lion sermon
- List of buildings that survived the Great Fire of London
- List of churches and cathedrals of London
