= Hornby Vellard =

Project to link the seven islands of Mumbai with causeways

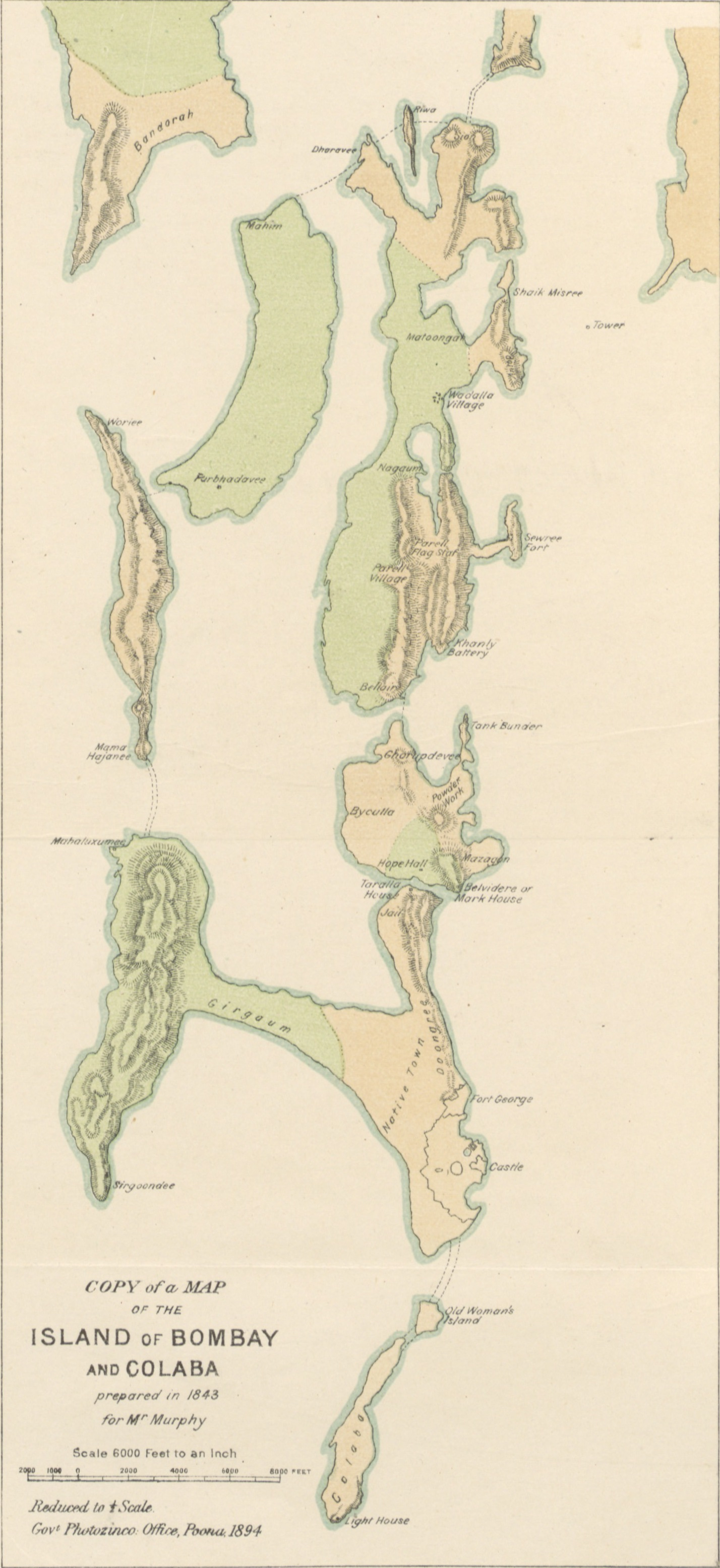
Island of Bombay and Colaba

The Hornby Vellard was a project to build a causeway uniting all seven islands of Bombay into a single island with a deep natural harbour. The project was started by the governor William Hornby in 1782 and all islands were linked by 1838. The word vellard appears to be a local corruption of the Portuguese word vallado meaning fence or embankment. The seven islets - their anglicised names being Colaba, Old Woman’s Island, Bombay, Mazgaon, Parel, Mahim and Worli - came to the British in 1661 as part of the dowry of Charles II, who married into the Portuguese royal family.

The purpose of this causeway was to block the Worli creek and prevent the low-lying areas of Bombay from being flooded at high tide. The cost was estimated at £100,000. It was completed in 1784 and was one of the first major civil engineering projects that transformed the original seven islands of Bombay into one island. According to some accounts, Hornby ordered the work to be started after the East India Company turned down his proposal; and continued as Governor till the end of his term in 1785, ignoring the suspension notice sent to him.

== History ==
Hornby Vellard was an 18th‑century engineering project initiated by Governor William Hornby in 1782 to dam the "Great Breach" Worli creek and unify Bombay’s original seven islands into a single landmass. Completed in 1784 at a cost of approximately £100,000 (₹15 lakh (equivalent to ₹103 crore or US$11 million in 2026)), it blocked tidal flooding of low‑lying areas and formed the foundation for later reclamation works that, by 1838, had linked Colaba, Old Woman’s Island, Bombay, Mazgaon, Parel, Mahim and Worli into today’s Mumbai. Hornby proceeded with the work despite the East India Company’s initial refusal, reportedly ignoring suspension orders to see the project through to completion. Bombay was quickly palmed off to the East India Company for a paltry £10 a year and later the company identified that more land means more money hence got interested in the project.

== Structure and Specifications ==
The Hornby Vellard is an approximately 850 m long earthen embankment composed of layered clay and alluvial soil compacted to form a stable core, its upstream face clad in hand‑dressed basalt stones set in hydraulic lime mortar to resist tidal erosion. The embankment was reinforced against lateral tidal forces and downpours.

A gravel‑surfaced roadway, later tarred in the early 19th century, crowns the causeway and provided the first continuous land link between Bombay’s islands, exemplifying an early fusion of European surveying precision and indigenous construction materials. The Hornby Vellard permanently sealed the tidal breach at Worli Creek and reclaimed the marshy northern flats, creating the first solid link between Bombay’s islands and setting the stage for further land reclamation. By 1803 the Sion Causeway carried carts and pedestrians from Bombay Island to Salsette Island, opening up the hinterland for settlement and trade. The Colaba Causeway, laid in 1838, extended the city southward by connecting the old town to Colaba Island, while the Mahim-Bandra Causeway of 1845 provided a vital carriage road across the marshes between Mahim and Bandra. Together, these engineering works transformed a cluster of Seven Islands of Bombay into a continuous landmass, enabling Bombay’s rapid urban and economic expansion.
