= Phillip Gifford =

Deputy Governor of Bombay

Phillip Gifford was the Deputy Governor of Bombay from 1670 to 1676.
