= Thomas Hodges (governor of Bombay) =

British Governor of Bombay

Thomas Hodges (died 1771) was the British Governor of Bombay from 28 September 1767 to 23 February 1771. He signed a peace treaty between the East India Company and Hyder Ali in 1770.

Thomas Hodges was the son of Thomas Hodges of Bredy, Dorset. He married a daughter of Colonel Hallett of Barbados; their son, Thomas Hallett Hodge, married a daughter of the political reformer John Cartwright.

Political offices
Preceded by Charles Crommelin	Governor of Bombay; 1767–1771	Succeeded by William Hornby
