= Richard Keigwin (colonial administrator) =

Former governor of Bombay

Captain Richard Keigwin
- Died: 21 June 1690; Basseterre
- Occupations: Governor of St Helena (before 1676); Head of Bombay East India Charter military forces (1677–1681); Rebel Governor of Bombay (1683–84); Captain of HMS Reserve (1660), then HMS Assistance

Captain Richard Keigwin (died 21 June 1690) was a rebel governor of Bombay (now Mumbai) in 1683–84 during the East India Company's charter over Bombay. He was never recognized in this position by the company. He acted as governor of Bombay with the support of the militia, whose salaries had been cut by the Governor, Joshua Child. He was also supported by the population at large who welcomed the withdrawal of trade monopolies during this period.

== In India ==
Keigwin had served as governor of St. Helena before coming to Bombay in 1676. At the time Bombay was under the control of the English East India Company however Keigwin was an independent settler. Shortly after arriving he was put in charge of a military force and gained a seat on the governing council of Bombay. From 1677 to 1681 he served as the head of company military forces in Bombay, but the Bombay trading operations were under the control of a governor based in Surat with a deputy governor at Bombay. In 1679 Keigwin was involved in winning a significant naval victory against the Mahrattas. During this time the head government authority in Bombay was Henry Oxenden. In 1682 John Child became governor of East India Company Operations based in Surat. He received orders to reduce the cost of operations in Bombay and sent his brother-in-law Charles Ward to serve as his deputy in Bombay. The troops in Bombay did not like having their wages cut so they revolted and declared Keigwin governor.

Keigwin then sent a letter to England asking Charles II to take direct control of Bombay again stating that the East India Company had failed. After running Bombay for about a year Sir Thomas Grantham arrived to straighten things out. Grantham worked out a general pardon, allowed Keigwin to retain the salary he had collected while acting as governor and then brought Keigwin back to England with him.

== Later life and death ==
In May 1689 Keigwin was appointed captain of the frigate HMS Reserve; from which he was shortly moved into HMS Assistance. Early in 1690 he was sent to the West Indies under the orders of Commodore Lawrence Wright. At the attack on St Kitts on 21 June, he was landed in command of the marine regiment, and fell at the head of his men as he was leading them on to the assault of Basseterre.

== Sources ==
- John Keay. The Honorable Company: A History of the English East India Company. New York: Macmillan, 1991. pp. 137–139.
- Laughton, John Knox; Mentz, Søren (2004). "Keigwin, Richard (d. 1690)". Oxford Dictionary of National Biography (online ed.). Oxford University Press. doi:10.1093/ref:odnb/15254. (Subscription, Wikipedia Library access or UK public library membership required.)

Attribution This article incorporates text from a publication now in the public domain: Lee, Sidney, ed. (1892). "Keigwin, Richard". Dictionary of National Biography. Vol. 30. London: Smith, Elder & Co.
