= Pollexfen =

Pollexfen is a British, South Devon surname associated and may refer to:

- Henry Pollexfen (1632–1691), British judge and politician
- John Pollexfen (1636–1715), British merchant, political economist, and Justice-of-the-Peace
- Jack Pollexfen (1908–2003), US screenwriter and film producer
- Susan Pollexfen (1841-3–1900), wife of Irish artist John Butler Yeats

== See also ==
- Edmund Pollexfen Bastard (1784–1838), British Tory politician
- John Pollexfen Bastard (1756–1816), British Tory politician and colonel of the East Devonshire Militia
