= Matthew Gray (governor of Bombay) =

Governor of Bombay

Matthew Gray was the Deputy Governor of Bombay from 14 July 1669 to 7 June 1672.
