= John Wyborne =

English governor of Bombay

Sir John Wyborne was an English governor of Bombay during the period of the Honourable East India Company. He assumed the office in 1686 and left office on 4 February 1690.

A friend of Samuel Pepys, he was sent to India by the East India Company to deal with piracy.
