= Sir John Child, 1st Baronet =

British diplomat and governor

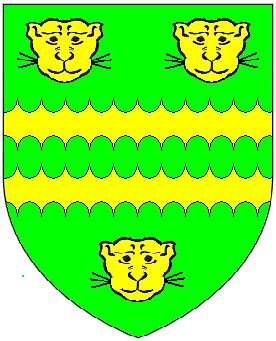
Arms of Child Baronets (of the City of London): Vert, two bars engrailed between three lion's faces or

Sir John Child, 1st Baronet (died 1690) was a governor of Bombay, and de facto (although not officially) the first governor-general of the English settlements in India.

== Life ==
Born in London, Child was sent as a child to his uncle, the chief of the factory at Rajapur. on 27 October 1681, he was appointed chief of the East India Company's affairs at Surat and Bombay, while at the same time his namesake, stated to be unrelated by the Oxford Dictionary of National Biography, Sir Josiah Child, was governor of the company at home.

The two men guided the affairs of the company through the period of struggle between the Mughals and Marathas. They have been credited by history with the change from unarmed to armed trade on the part of the company; however, both were actually loath to quarrel with the Mughal Empire. War broke out with Aurangzeb in 1689, but in the following year Child had to sue for peace, one of the conditions being that he should be expelled from India. He escaped this expulsion by his death on 4 February 1690, and was as English president of Surat and Bombay succeeded by Bartholomew Harris.

== Armorials ==
Burke's Armorials 1884 gives his arms as follows: (Child of Surat, East Indies and Dervill, Essex, bart. created 1684, extinct 1753): Vert, two bars engrailed between three leopard's faces or. Crest: A leopard's face or between 2 laurel branches proper. Motto: Spes Alit (Hope Nourishes). These arms are in no way similar to those of Sir Josiah Child or Sir Francis Child, of Child & Co bankers, which seems to confirm the lack of any family relationship to the other Child baronetcies.

Government offices
Preceded by Sir Henry Oxenden, 3rd Baronet	Governor of Bombay; 1681 – 1690	Succeeded by Bartholomew Harris
Baronetage of England
New creation	Baronet (of the City of London); 1685–1690	Succeeded by Caesar Child
