= C. W. Foster =

English antiquarian, historian and archivist, born 1866

Canon Charles Wilmer Foster, FSA, FRHistS (1866–1935) was an English clergyman, antiquarian, historian and archivist. He founded the Lincoln Record Society in 1910 and served as its secretary and general editor until his death; he made major contributions towards scholarship on the county and diocese of Lincoln, principally through publishing editions of historical documents.

== Early life and education ==
Charles Wilmer Foster was born on 3 June 1866 in Dalton, Yorkshire, where his father Charles William Foster was the vicar. His mother Isabella Mary was the daughter of Francis Wilmer Watkins, a surgeon in the East India Company. Foster was educated at Rossall School and St John's College, Oxford (1884–87). He graduated from the later with a pass-grade BA in 1887.

== Church of England priest ==
After studying at the Leeds Clergy School, he was ordained a priest and appointed to a curacy at St Michael's, Coventry, in 1889. From 1891, he held curacies in Lincolnshire, firstly at St Andrew's, Grimsby, where he remained until 1894. Between 1894 and 1898, he served as curate at Epworth, and then spent three years as a curate at St Andrew's once more.

In 1902, Foster was presented to the vicarage of Timberland, in which incumbency he served until his death in 1935. At the same time, he was also the secretary to the Lincoln Diocesan Board of Education between 1904 and 1922 and secretary of the Lincoln Diocesan Trust and Board of Finance from 1908 to 1926. In 1908, he was appointed a canon of Lincoln Cathedral and prebend of Leicester St Margaret. He served as rural dean of Longoboby between 1922 and 1925.

== Scholarship ==
Foster's interest in historical scholarship began early. His first book, a history of the Wilmer family, was published in 1888. His time at Grimsby brought him into contact with the diocesan records at Lincoln, while his time at Epworth was spent under Canon John Henry Overton, a noted historian of the church. He published his first volume of a series of calendars of Lincoln's probate records in 1902. After his appointment as vicar of Timberland, Foster began a project to preserve, sort and list the records of the diocese and cathedral of Lincoln. Realising the vastness and importance of these ecclesiastical records, Foster played a central role in the founding of the Lincoln Record Society (dedicated to publishing editions of the documents) in 1910. He was subsequently general editor and secretary to the society. Between 1910 and his death in 1935, he also contributed eleven of the society's twenty-nine publications – all but one edited by him alone.

Foster's work involved editing documents about the church in 16th- and 17th-century Lincolnshire, and also the county and diocese's medieval records, the latter of which became his focus in the 1920s. He produced a calendar of 13th-century feet of fines from Lincolnshire in 1920, and then (with Canon Thomas Longley) an edition of the Lincolnshire sections of the Domesday survey, with an edition of the Lindsey Survey and a useful introduction on the county's lost settlements. Finally, he began a project to publish every document dating from before 1235 in the muniments of the Dean and Chapter of Lincoln. What followed was a careful and scholarly series of editions of these documents, three volumes of which were published before he died, and a further seven were continued thereafter by Kathleen Major, all under the title Registrum Antiquissimum, the name given to a 13th-century cartulary in the collection. This alerted many scholars to the range of this archive; as the medievalist Frank Stenton wrote, "under his treatment, the archives of Lincoln Cathedral became national records". Foster also published genealogical records; he continued to produce his calendar of Lincolnshire wills, and wrote a history of Aisthorpe and Thorpe-in-the-Fallows.

== Recognition and legacy ==
Foster was elected a fellow of the Society of Antiquaries of London in 1910 and a fellow of the Royal Historical Society in 1919. In 1933, he was awarded an honorary Doctor of Letters degree by the University of Oxford.

Foster died on 29 October 1935. His obituary in The Times noted Foster's "profound and detailed knowledge of medieval Lincolnshire". As Frank Stenton wrote, "It is undoubtedly through the new materials which he made available to historians that Canon Foster contributed most to knowledge. But it should also be remembered that he saved innumerable documents from destruction or decay ... through him the records which illustrate [Lincolnshire's] past have become part of the fabric of English history". Kathleen Major also described him as a "pioneering archivist".

== Bibliography ==
- Bennett, Nicholas, Wonderful to Behold: A Centenary History of the Lincoln Record Society, 1910–2010, Publications of the Lincoln Record Society, no. 100 (Woodbridge: Boydell and Brewer for the Lincoln Record Society, 2010).
- Major, Kathleen, "Canon Charles Wilmer Foster, MA, Hon DLitt (Oxon), FSA: A Pioneer Archivist and Editor of Records", Archives, vol. 18 (1987), pp. 42–49.
- Stenton, F. M., "Charles Wilmer Foster", in C. W. Foster and Kathleen Major (ed.), The Registrum Antiquissimum of the Cathedral Church of Lincoln, vol. 4, Publications of the Lincoln Record Society, no. 32 (Hereford: Hereford Times Ltd for the Lincoln Record Society, 1937), pp. xi–xvi.
