= Lincoln Record Society =

British text publication society

- Predecessor: Lincolnshire Record Society
- Founded: 1910
- Founder: C. W. Foster
- Country of origin: United Kingdom
- Distribution: Boydell & Brewer
- Publication types: Books
- Nonfiction topics: Historic records
- Official website: www.lincoln-record-society.org.uk

Lincoln Record Society is a British text publication society founded in 1910 which edits and publishes historic records relating to Lincolnshire and the Diocese of Lincoln. The ancient diocese covered not only Lincolnshire, but also Leicestershire, Northamptonshire, Rutland, Oxfordshire, Bedfordshire, Buckinghamshire, Huntingdonshire and parts of Hertfordshire, and the society's publications may touch on the history of all these areas. In practice, they have tended to relate either to the ecclesiastical administration of the diocese (in its several geographical incarnations), or to the broader history of the county.

== History ==
=== Prehistory: Lincolnshire Record Society ===
A precursor body was the Lincolnshire Record Society, founded in January 1889, and modelled on other county-based record societies including the Oxford Historical Society (founded 1884) and Somerset Record Society (founded 1886). The society published an edition of the chronicle of Louth Park Abbey in 1891, but this was to prove its only publication, and shortly afterwards it faded from view.

=== Lincoln Record Society ===
The Lincoln Record Society was established in October 1910. The principal initiator was Canon C. W. Foster (1866–1935), who since 1906 had served as secretary of the diocesan Records Committee. Another cofounder was local historian Eleanor Blanche Tempest. Foster became the first general editor of the new society, as well as its secretary and, from 1918, its treasurer, running it largely single-handedly until his death in 1935. He personally edited 12 of its volumes. He was succeeded as general editor and secretary by Kathleen Major (1906–2000), who held both posts until 1956, when she resigned the secretaryship on her appointment as Principal of St Hilda's College, Oxford: she remained general editor until 1975 (serving her final year jointly with Dorothy Owen). Subsequent general editors have been Dorothy Owen, 1975–95; Professor David Smith, 1995–2002; and Nicholas Bennett, 2002–date.

Prominent supporters (albeit at a distance) over several decades included the historians Frank Stenton and his wife Doris. Frank Stenton edited a volume of medieval charters of five Lincolnshire Gilbertine monasteries, published as the society's 18th volume in 1922, and later served as its President from 1942 to 1967; while Doris Stenton edited a volume of early 13th-century Lincolnshire Assize Rolls, published as the 22nd volume in 1926, and continued to maintain close contact with the society.

In 1912, to meet the interests of genealogists, the society established a Parish Register Section, with a separate subscription, for publishing Lincolnshire parish registers. Nine volumes of registers were published (seven of them edited by Canon Foster); but the series had to be abandoned as printing costs rose in the 1920s.

The society is a registered charity in England and Wales.

== Publications ==
=== Main series ===
The Society's first two publications, agreed in November 1910, were an edition of early 17th-century Lincolnshire church notes compiled by the antiquary Gervase Holles, edited by R. E. G. Cole; and a calendar of the acts of Bishop Thomas Cooper (1571–84), edited by Foster. The two volumes appeared in 1911 and 1912 respectively.

A particularly important series comprised the ten volumes of Registrum Antiquissimum, an edition of the medieval charters of Lincoln Cathedral, with two additional volumes of facsimiles. The first four volumes, published between 1931 and 1937, were edited by Canon Foster (the last being completed and seen through the press after his death by Kathleen Major); and the final six, plus the two facsimile volumes, published between 1937 and 1973, by Kathleen Major.

Recent volumes, which illustrate the range of subject-matter addressed, have included:

- Mills, D. R.; Wheeler, R.C., eds. (2004). Historic Town Plans of Lincoln, 1610–1920. Lincoln Record Society. Vol. 92.
- Rigby, S. H., ed. (2005). The Overseas Trade of Boston in the reign of Richard II. Lincoln Record Society. Vol. 93.
- Ambler, R. W., ed. (2006). Lincolnshire Parish Correspondence of John Kaye, Bishop of Lincoln, 1827–53. Lincoln Record Society. Vol. 94.
- Beardsley, Martyn; Bennett, Nicholas, eds. (2007). "Gratefull to providence": the Diary and Accounts of Matthew Flinders, Surgeon, Apothecary and Man-midwife, 1775–1802. Vol. I: 1775–1784. Lincoln Record Society. Vol. 95.
- Wheeler, R. C., ed. (2008). Maps of the Witham Fens from the thirteenth to the nineteenth century. Lincoln Record Society. Vol. 96.
- Beardsley, M.; Bennett, N., eds. (2009). "Gratefull to providence": the Diary and Accounts of Matthew Flinders, Surgeon, Apothecary and Man-midwife, 1775–1802. Vol. II: 1784–1802. Lincoln Record Society. Vol. 97.
- Squires, Stewart; Hollamby, Ken, eds. (2009). Building a Railway: Bourne to Saxby. Lincoln Record Society. Vol. 98.
- Honeybone, Diana; Honeybone, Martyn, eds. (2010). The Correspondence of the Spalding Gentlemen's Society, 1710–1761. Lincoln Record Society. Vol. 99.
- Bennett, Nicholas, ed. (2011). The Registers of Henry Burghersh, 1320–1342: III. Lincoln Record Society. Vol. 101.
- Davye, B.J.; Wheeler, R.C., eds. (2012). The Country Justice and the Case of the Blackamoor's Head: the Practice of the Law in Lincolnshire, 1787–1838. Lincoln Record Society. Vol. 102.
- Bennett, Nicholas, ed. (2013). Lincolnshire Parish Clergy c.1214–1968. A Biographical Register. Part I: The Deaneries of Aslacoe and Aveland. Lincoln Record Society. Vol. 103.
- Honeybone, Diana; Honeybone, Martyn, eds. (2014). The Correspondence of William Stukeley and Maurice Johnson, 1714–1754. Lincoln Record Society. Vol. 104.
- Bennett, Nicholas, ed. (2016). Lincolnshire Parish Clergy c.1214–1968. A Biographical Register. Part II: The Deaneries of Beltisloe and Bolingbroke. Lincoln Record Society. Vol. 105.
- Manterfield, John B., ed. (2016). Borough Government in Newton's Grantham: the Hall Book of Grantham, 1649–1662. Lincoln Record Society. Vol. 106.
- Malcolmson, Patricia; Malcolmson, Robert, eds. (2017). A Parson in Wartime: the Boston diary of the Reverend Arthur Hopkins, 1942–1945. Lincoln Record Society. Vol. 107.

The society's 100th volume, published to commemorate its centenary in 2010, was a history of the society itself by Nicholas Bennett.

All volumes have been issued in a uniform cream binding. Most have been issued in standard octavo format, but a small number, containing facsimile material, have appeared in a larger folio format: these have included the two facsimile volumes of Registrum Antiquissimum (LRS vols 42 and 68); a facsimile edition of extracts from the minute-books of the Spalding Gentlemen’s Society, 1712–1755 (LRS vol. 73); a volume of town plans of Lincoln (LRS vol. 92); another of maps of the Witham Fens (LRS vol. 96); and another based on an album of photographs of the construction of the Bourne to Saxby railway, 1890–93 (LRS vol. 98).

=== Parish Register Section ===
The nine volumes of the Parish Register Section, which were not included in the society's main numbered series, were published between 1913 and 1925.

=== Occasional Publications ===
In 2016, the society inaugurated a separate series of "Occasional Publications". The first (and to date only) volume in this series is Steep, Strait and High: ancient houses of central Lincoln (2016) by Christopher Johnson and Stanley Jones, which forms the final volume in a series of architectural and historical surveys of the historic buildings of Lincoln, originally undertaken by the Survey of Ancient Houses sponsored by the Lincoln Civic Trust, and continued by the Survey of Lincoln.

== Grants ==
The society offers research grants, for sums ranging from £500 to £5,000 (with a possibility of renewal), for projects falling within its areas of interest.

== Sources ==
- Bennett, Nicholas (2010). Wonderful to Behold: a centenary history of the Lincoln Record Society, 1910–2010. Lincoln Record Society publications. Vol. 100. Woodbridge: Boydell. ISBN 9780901503886.
