= Hoveringham =

Village and civil parish in Nottinghamshire, England

Coordinates: 53°01′N 0°58′W

- Village and civil parish
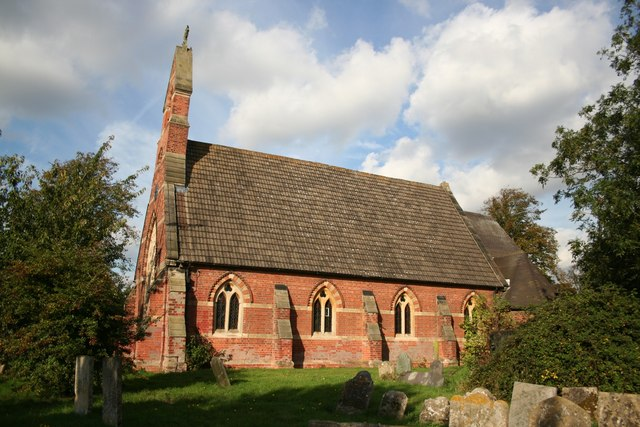
- St Michael's Church, Hoveringham

- Location within Nottinghamshire
- Interactive map of Hoveringham
- Area: 1.8 sq mi (4.7 km^{2})
- Population: 308 (2021)
  - Density: 171/sq mi (66/km^{2})
- OS grid reference: SK 699468
  - London: 110 mi (180 km) SSE
- District: Newark and Sherwood
- Shire county: Nottinghamshire
- Region: East Midlands
- Country: England
- Sovereign state: United Kingdom
- Post town: NOTTINGHAM
- Postcode district: NG14
- Dialling code: 0115 / 01636
- Police: Nottinghamshire
- Fire: Nottinghamshire
- Ambulance: East Midlands
- UK Parliament: Newark
- Website: www.hoveringhamparishcouncil.org.uk

Hoveringham is a small village and civil parish in Nottinghamshire, about 10 miles (16 km) northeast of the county town of Nottingham and on the west side of the River Trent, and just off the A612 trunk road to Southwell. The population of the civil parish as taken at the 2011 census was 359, decreasing to 308 at the 2021 census. The adjacent area has extensive sand and gravel deposits which have been quarried there for many years.

== Historical ==
Hoveringham was in existence in 1086 in the hundred of Thurgarton, as indicated in the Domesday Book. The manor and lands had been, in the 13th century and later, in the possession of the Gousehill family, Sir Richard Gousehill, Knt., who was slain at the Battle of Shrewsbury 21 July 1403, being then Lord of the Manor of Hoveringham. This is confirmed in White's Directory of Nottinghamshire, 1853:

"Near the village there was once a ferry across the Trent to Kneeton. In the reign on Henry III it was possessed by Hugh de Hoveringham, and afterwards passed to the Goushill family, by whom a great part of the estate was given to Thurgarton Priory, from which it passed to Trinity College, Cambridge, which has since received other lands in lieu of the tithes. This parish was tithe free for upwards of 70 years until 1851, when four shillings per acre was laid on as tithe, but it is the opinion of all the freeholders that it is not legal. In 1795, many old writings and documents which were deposited in the church were destroyed by the great flood. It is supposed that the writings belonging to the land which was set apart in lieu of the tithes were amongst them. Sir Richard Sutton, Bart., is lessee of the manorial rights, and of 647 acres (2.62 km^{2}) of college land, which was held by the Cooper family, from the time of the Reformation till 1830. There are about 20 freeholders in the parish. The church is a small, ancient structure, dedicated to St. Michael, and is in the patronage of the same college. It is a perpetual curacy, was valued at £60, and is annexed to that of Thurgarton."

== Gravel ==
Gravel extraction was started in this area in 1939 by the Hoveringham Gravel company, which was taken over in 1982 by Tarmac. The Hoveringham Gravel Company used to have a mammoth as their logo on their lorries as a celebration of the finding of mammoth remains in their workings.

== Hoveringham Cricket Club ==
Hoveringham Cricket Club was founded before 1803 and is one of the oldest clubs in Nottinghamshire. it currently has three teams, Saturday 1st team in Gunn, Moore South Notts League division A, and a 2nd team in division N of the same league. There is also a Sunday friendly team. Hoveringham Cricket Club 1st XI boasts a record eight consecutive league promotions.

== See also ==
- Listed buildings in Hoveringham
