= Listed buildings in Bleasby, Nottinghamshire =

Bleasby is a civil parish in the Newark and Sherwood district of Nottinghamshire, England. The parish contains nine listed buildings that are recorded in the National Heritage List for England. Of these, one is at Grade II*, the middle of the three grades, and the others are at Grade II, the lowest grade. The parish contains the villages of Bleasby and Goverton and the surrounding area, and the listed buildings consist of a church and its former vicarage, other houses, one with an attached pump, a pigeoncote, and a war memorial.

== Key ==
Grade	Criteria
II*	Particularly important buildings of more than special interest
II	Buildings of national importance and special interest

== Buildings ==
Name and location	Photograph	Date	Notes	Grade
St Mary's Church; 53.03871°N 0.93109°W		13th century	The church has been altered and extended through the centuries, it was largely rebuilt in the 19th century, and was restored and extended in 1869 by Ewan Christian. The church is built in stone with roofs of tile and slate, and consists of a nave, a north aisle, a north chapel, a south porch, a chancel, and a west tower. The tower has two stages with diagonal buttresses, a west window, a clock face on the south side, two-light bell openings, and an embattled parapet.	II
The Old House; 53.03742°N 0.92837°W	—	c. 1500	The house, which has been altered and extended, is in stone and red brick, it is partly rendered, and has roofs of tile and pantile. The original part, initially an open hall, has two storeys and attics on a plinth, and two bays. On the front is a doorway with a rendered surround, and casement windows. To the left and recessed is a two-storey three-bay wing containing a mix of casement and horizontally-sliding sash windows.	II*
Goverton House and pump 53.04236°N 0.95006°W	—	17th century	A house that has been extended, in painted red brick with slate roofs. The original part has two storeys and attics, and three bays, a floor band and a wooden cornice. In the centre is an open porch with rusticated jambs and a segmental dentilled moulded arch, and a doorway with a segmental arch. The windows are sashes with segmental arches, and to the right of the doorway is a pump in lead, wood and iron. To the right of the original block is a projecting two-storey single-bay wing, to the left and recessed is a lower two-storey four-bay wing, and on the far right is a later wing with two storeys, four bays, and a hipped roof. It has chamfered quoins, a sill band, an eaves cornice, and a doorway with a moulded surround, a fanlight, and a hood on decorative brackets.	II
Bleasby East Hall and West Hall; 53.03743°N 0.93265°W	—	Early 18th century	A house that has been altered, and divided into two houses, it is in stuccoed and painted red brick, with a modillion eaves cornice, and slate roofs with coped gables. There are two storeys and attics and seven bays, the middle and outer bays projecting with embattled parapets. In the centre is a recessed porch with a Tudor arched entrance, and a doorway with a fanlight. The windows are a mix of sashes and casements, all with Tudor-style hood moulds, and in the attic are dormers. To the left, and recessed, is a lower wing with two storeys and attics and two bays, linked by a single bay with an embattled parapet.	II
Pigeoncote, Manor Farm; 53.04245°N 0.94605°W		Early 18th century	The pigeoncote is in red brick, with a floor band, dogtooth eaves, and a pyramidal tile roof surmounted by a glover with a pyramidal roof. There are two storeys and an attic, and a single storey. It contains doorways, windows and gabled dormers.	II
Fishermans; 53.03765°N 0.92970°W		Mid 18th century	The house, which has been extended, is in painted rendered brick, and has a pantile roof with brick coping and kneelers. There are two storeys, the main range has three bays, to the right is a lower recessed single-bay wing, and to the right of this is another single-bay wing, further recessed. The doorway has a hood on brackets, and the windows are sashes, those flanking the doorway with wedge lintels.	II
Little Dower House; 53.04230°N 0.94669°W	—	1824	The house is in red brick on a rendered plinth, with painted stone dressings and a hipped slate roof. There are two storeys and three bays. In the centre is a gabled timber porch and a doorway with a moulded surround. The windows on the front are sashes, and elsewhere they are casements. On the right return is a canted bay window, and at the rear is a gabled wing.	II
The Old Vicarage; 53.03968°N 0.93095°W	—	c. 1840	The vicarage, later a private house, is in rendered brick, with some stone, a raised eaves band, overhanging eaves, and a hipped slate roof. There are two storeys and three bays, the middle bay projecting and gabled, the eaves overhang on three stone brackets. The bay contains a doorway with a fanlight and a hood on two stone brackets. The windows are sashes, and at the rear are wings with one and two storeys.	II
War memorial 53.03838°N 0.93105°W		1920	The war memorial in the churchyard of St Mary's Church is in granite. It consists of a Celtic cross on a tapered plinth on a low square base. On the head of the cross and the base of the shaft is Celtic-style carving. On the plinth are inscriptions and the names of those lost in the two World Wars.	II
