= Doris Mary Stenton =

20th-century British medievalist

Doris Mary Stenton FBA
- Born: Doris Mary Parsons; 27 August 1894; Reading, Berkshire, England
- Died: 29 December 1971 (aged 77); Reading, Berkshire, England
- Resting place: Halloughton, Nottinghamshire
- Occupations: Historian and academic
- Spouse: Frank Stenton (m. 1919; died 1967)

Academic background
- Education: The Abbey School, Reading
- Alma mater: University College, Reading

Academic work
- Discipline: History

Doris Mary Stenton, Lady Stenton (1894–1971) was an English historian of the Middle Ages.

== Early Life and Education ==
Born Doris Mary Parsons on 27 August 1894, she was the daughter of John Parsons and his wife, Amelia Wadhams of Woodley, Berkshire. She was their only child and her father was a cabinet-maker. She attended The Abbey School in nearby Reading before entering the University College, Reading in 1912 as a day student, riding from Woodley on her bicycle. She earned a first-class London degree in 1916.

== Marriage ==
In 1919 she married Frank Stenton, who held the first chair of history at Reading and was already known as a medievalist.

== Academic Career and Research ==
=== 1920s ===
Even before her marriage, however, Stenton had begun work on the transcription of the charters of the cathedral chapter of Lincoln Cathedral. This project led to the first of Stenton's editorial jobs, the edition of The Earliest Lincolnshire Assize Rolls, A.D. 1202–1209 which was published by the Lincoln Record Society in 1926. Another fruit of the Lincoln project was the revival of the Pipe Roll Society which had become dormant. In 1922, the Stentons, along with Canon Foster of Lincoln Cathedral and Leonard Owen began discussions that revived the society. Further conversations led to Doris Stenton being appointed organising secretary of the society in 1923. It was mainly due to her efforts that the society became an important publishing source for medieval historians.

=== University Career ===
In 1948 Stenton earned a Doctor of Letters degree from the University of Reading, and in 1953 she was elected a Fellow of the British Academy (FBA). She also was known as Lady Stenton from 1948, when her husband was knighted. Other honours included honorary doctorates from Glasgow University and Oxford University and being selected as an honorary fellow at St Hilda's College at Oxford. She started her teaching career with an assistant lectureship in 1917 at University College, Reading. She later became a senior lecturer in the history department at Reading in 1952 and a reader in that department in 1955.

== Later Life ==
Up until Frank Stenton's death in 1967, both Stentons were engaged in numerous writing projects, but after her husband's death, Stenton concentrated on completing the third edition of his Anglo-Saxon England as well as issuing a collected edition of his papers. She completed that in 1971. She was troubled by deafness in her last years, and died on 29 December 1971 at Reading after an illness that lasted a week. She was buried at Halloughton, Nottinghamshire, on 5 January 1972 in the same grave as her husband.

Both Stenton and her husband were devoted to the study of history, with both being known and esteemed for their historical studies.

== Selected bibliography ==
- The Earliest Lincolnshire Assize Rolls, A.D. 1202–1209, published in 1926 by the Lincoln Record Society as its 22nd volume
- Rolls of the Justices of the Eyre for Lincolnshire, 1218–19 and Worcestershire, 1221, published in 1934 by the Selden Society as its 53rd volume
- Rolls of the Justices in Eyre for Yorkshire in 3 Henry III, published in 1937
- Rolls of the Justices in Eyre for Gloucestershire, Warwickshire and Staffordshire (recte Shropshire), 1221, 1222, in 1940
- Pleas before the King or his Justices, 1198–1202, in four volumes between 1952 and 1968
- English Society in the Early Middle Ages (1066–1307), published in 1951 as the third volume for the Pelican History of England
- English Justice between the Norman Conquest and the Great Charter 1066–1215: the Jayne Lectures for 1963: the Jayne Lectures were given to the American Philosophical Society.
- The English Woman in History, published in 1957
