= Thurgarton =

Village and civil parish in Nottinghamshire, England

Coordinates: 53.036°N 0.965°W

- Village and civil parish
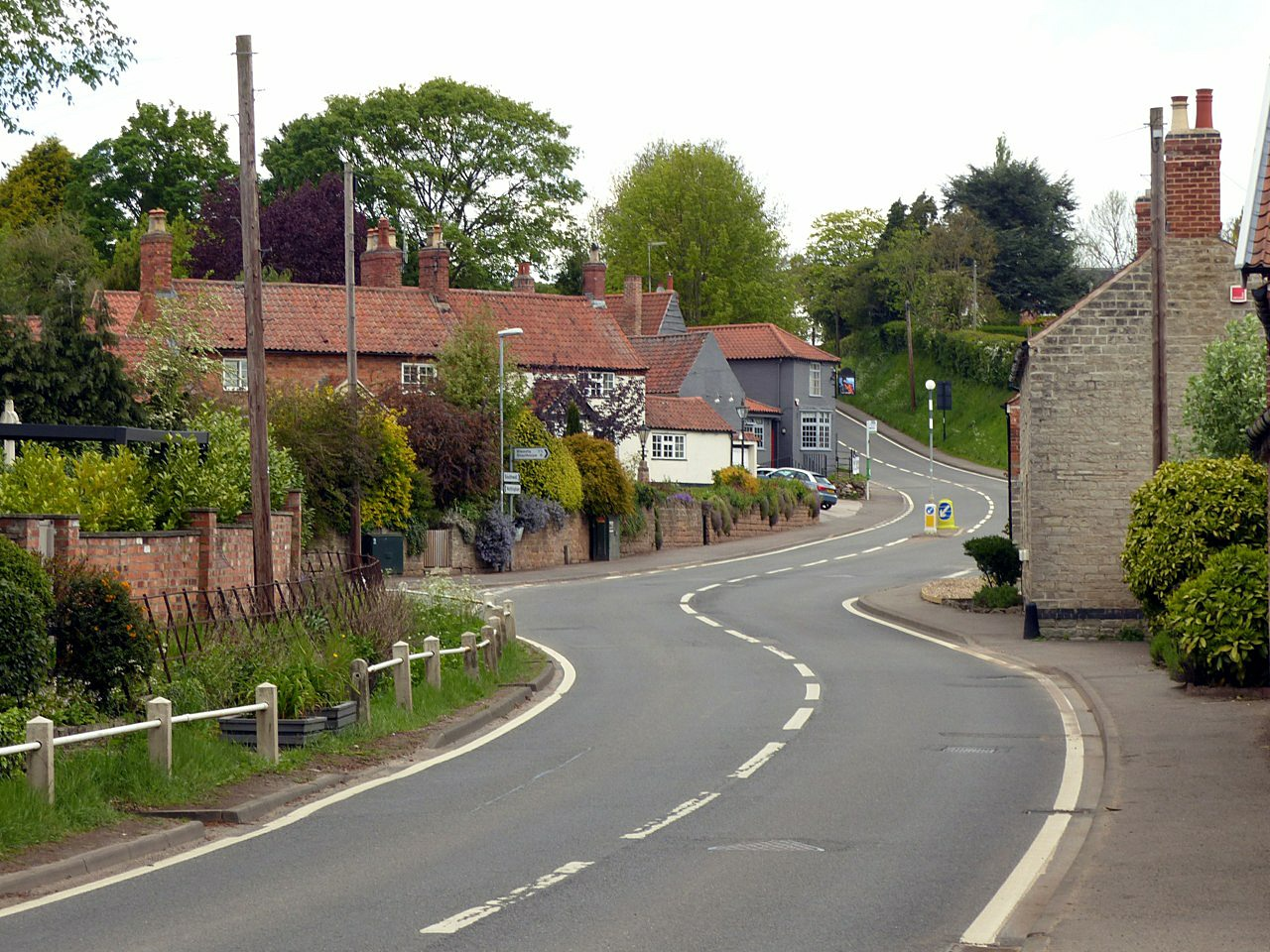
- Village Scene

- Location within Nottinghamshire
- Interactive map of Thurgarton
- Area: 4.01 sq mi (10.4 km^{2})
- Population: 445 (2021)
  - Density: 111/sq mi (43/km^{2})
- OS grid reference: SK 69393 49263
  - London: 110 mi (180 km) SSE
- District: Newark and Sherwood
- Shire county: Nottinghamshire
- Region: East Midlands
- Country: England
- Sovereign state: United Kingdom
- Post town: NOTTINGHAM
- Postcode district: NG14
- Dialling code: 01636
- Police: Nottinghamshire
- Fire: Nottinghamshire
- Ambulance: East Midlands
- UK Parliament: Newark
- Website: www.thurgarton.org.uk

Thurgarton /ˈθɜːrɡərtən/ is a small village in rural Nottinghamshire, England. The village is close to Southwell, and Newark-on-Trent and still within commuting distance to Nottingham. It is served by Thurgarton railway station. According to the 2001 census it had a population of 412, increasing to 440 at the 2011 census and marginally to 445 at the 2021 census.

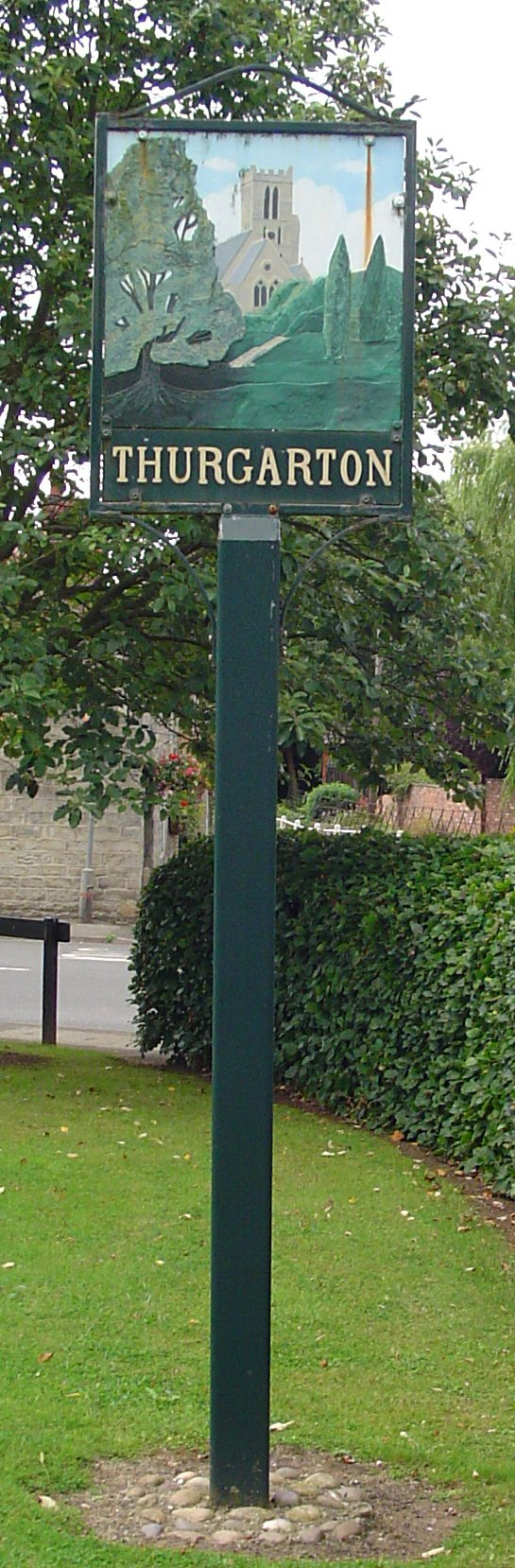
Signpost in Thurgarton

== Location ==
Thurgarton village and parish lie approximately 11 miles (18 km) to the north-east of Nottingham, and around 3 miles (5 km) to the south of Southwell. The River Trent is about a mile away, to the south-east. The parish covers around 2,570 acres (10.40 km^{2}; 4.02 sq mi) of land. Gonalston is to the south-west and Bleasby to the south-east.

The A612 road runs through Thurgarton, heading south out of Southwell. An alternative route is the A6097 trunk road. The ordnance survey grid reference is SK 6949.

== Christian links ==
Thurgarton is a lesser known place of pilgrimage for Christians wishing to pay respects to the mystical prelate, Walter Hilton. Born in 1343, "Walter Hilton studied Canon Law at Cambridge but after a period as a hermit, he joined the community of Augustinian Canons at Thurgarton in Nottinghamshire in about 1386. Highly regarded in his lifetime as a spiritual guide, he wrote in both Latin and English and translated several Latin devotional works. Controversy with "enthusiasts" and with the Lollard movement gave a sharper definition to his exposition of the aims, methods and disciplines of traditional spirituality. Among his major works, Ladder of Perfection (Book Two) declares that contemplation, understood in a profoundly Trinitarian context as awareness of grace and sensitivity to the Spirit, may and should be sought by all serious Christians." He died on 24 March 1396.

== History ==
The following is adapted from an extract from White's Directory of Nottingham, from the 1853 edition: "Thurgarton is a pleasant village and parish, situated at the foot of a declivity overlooking the vale of the Trent, three miles (5 km) south of Southwell. It contains 385 inhabitants and 2,477 acres (10 km^{2}) of land, enclosed about 80 years ago, when land was allotted for the tithes to Trinity College, Cambridge, which has the patronage of the curacy, and about one third of the lordship. The greater part of the remainder belongs to Richard Milward Esq., who is lord of the manor, and who resides at Thurgarton Priory, a large handsome mansion. The grounds about it rise in gentle swells, and are agreeably diversified with wood and water. The worthy owner has made great improvements since the estate came into his possession.

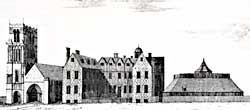
Priory in 1726

"The old priory was taken down in the mid-18th century by J. G. Cooper Esq., who erected the present mansion on its site, the cellars of which are the only portions of the religious sanctuary that now remain. The ancient priory was founded in 1130 by Ralph de Ayncourt, for canons of the order of St Augustine. He dedicated it to Saint Peter, and left God's favour to his heirs if they preserved it, but God's anger and curse if they did not. It possessed, at the dissolution, a yearly revenue of £259 15s 10d. (equivalent to £220,000 as of 2023), The antiquary must be allowed to lament the false taste which dictated the destruction of so noble a monument of ancient grandeur. The Rev. Thomas Coates Cane also has an estate here.

"The church, dedicated to St Peter, is situated near the priory, and has been a large magnificent structure, though it now consists only of one aisle. The curacy was certified at £56, and has been augmented with two lots of Queen Anne's Bounty. It is annexed to that of Hoveringham. The two livings have recently been augmented to the value of £450 by Trinity College, Cambridge, and in 1850 a large, handsome parsonage house was erected for the present incumbent, the Rev. Henry Lea Guilleband MA, who is now erecting a neat Sunday school. The school has a rent charge of £10 for the education of 20 boys of this parish, and Hoveringham. The poor of Thurgarton have the interest of £110 left by the families of Baker and Matthews. The Midland Company's Railway, Nottingham and Lincoln Branch, pass through this parish, and has a neat station here.

"Bankwood, 2 miles (3 km) west, Thurgarton Hill, half a mile west, Thurgarton Quarters, 2½ miles west, Magsdale, half a mile north of the village, are farms which belong to Richard Milward Esq. At Magsdale, in about 1810, many human bones and spear heads were dug up on the Sheep Close. The spear heads &c. are in the possession of Richard Milward Esq., and also a piece or pig of lead, which is more than one man can lift. This was found in 1849, at Upper Hexgrave, near Southwell."

== Religious sites ==
The Priory Church of St Peter, Thurgarton is adjacent to the Priory. It was restored in 1853. Parish registers exist from 1721, whereas earlier records were lost in 1780. There is also a Methodist chapel in Thurgarton.

== See also ==
- Listed buildings in Thurgarton

== Works by Walter Hilton ==
- Scale (or Ladder) of Perfection
- Song of Angels
- Treatise Written to a Devout Man
