= St Michael's Church, Hoveringham =

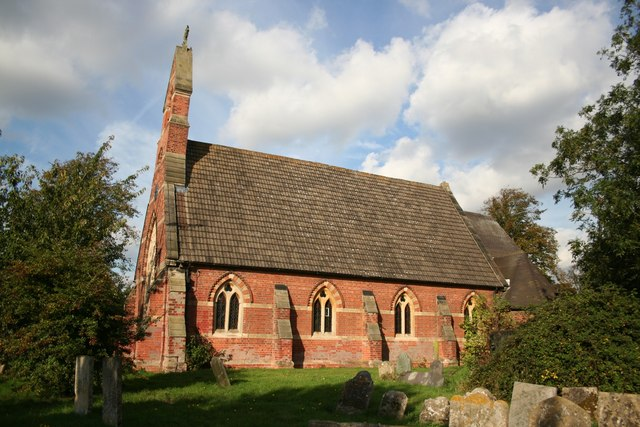
- St Michael's Church, Hoveringham
- St Michael's Church, Hoveringham
- 53°0′43.12″N 0°57′36.74″W
- OS grid reference: SK 69848 46625
- Location: Hoveringham
- Country: England
- Denomination: Church of England

History
- Dedication: St Michael

Architecture
- Heritage designation: Grade II listed

Administration
- Diocese: Diocese of Southwell and Nottingham
- Archdeaconry: Newark
- Deanery: Newark and Southwell
- Parish: Hoveringham

St Michael's Church, Hoveringham is a Grade II listed parish church in the Church of England in Hoveringham, Nottinghamshire, England.

== History ==
The church contains a 12th-century tympanum, but was largely rebuilt in 1865 by William Knight of Nottingham.

It is in a joint parish with:

- St Mary's Church, Bleasby
- St James' Church, Halloughton
- Priory Church of St. Peter, Thurgarton

== Burials ==
- Elizabeth Fitzalan, Duchess of Norfolk and her third husband, Sir Robert Goushill (or Gousell) in the Goushill tomb

== Organ ==
An organ was installed in June 1891 by Charles Lloyd. This was replaced in the early 1970s by an organ from elsewhere installed by Henry Groves & Son. A specification of the organ can be found on the National Pipe Organ Register.

== See also ==
- Listed buildings in Hoveringham
