= Listed buildings in Hoveringham =

Hoveringham is a civil parish in the Newark and Sherwood district of Nottinghamshire, England. The parish contains seven listed buildings that are recorded in the National Heritage List for England. All the listed buildings are designated at Grade II, the lowest of the three grades, which is applied to "buildings of national importance and special interest". The parish contains the village of Hoveringham and the surrounding countryside. Most of the listed buildings are in the village, and consist of a church, a sundial in the churchyard, houses, a cottage and a farmhouse, and outside the village are a mill and a mill house.

== Buildings ==
Name and location	Photograph	Date	Notes
Homeleigh; 53.01573°N 0.95812°W		17th century	The house has a timber framed core, it is encased in rendered brick, and has a half-hipped pantile roof. On the front is a gabled porch, a bow window, a casement window and two raking dormers. Inside, there is surviving timber framing.
Sundial; 53.01229°N 0.96034°W		Early 18th century	The sundial in the churchyard of St Michael's Church consists of a slim octagonal stone shaft with broach stops at the base, on a base with chamfered corners and broach spurs. On the top are the remains of a lead sundial.
St. Michael's Farm House; 53.01217°N 0.96313°W		Mid 18th century	Originally two or three cottages, the farmhouse is in red brick with a blue brick band at the base, raised brick eaves, and a pantile roof with brick coped gables and kneelers. There are two storeys and six bays. The windows are horizontally-sliding sashes, and the ground floor openings have segmental arches.
Hoveringham Mill and Mill Farm House; 53.01230°N 0.98107°W		1778	The mill and the farmhouse straddle Dover Beck, and are in red brick with pantile roofs. The mill has three storeys and attics, and three bays, and recessed to the right is a single-storey wing housing the waterwheel. The house has two storeys and two bays, and a later two-storey three-bay range. Over the mill race is a single-storey wing on two segmental arches. The windows in both parts are sashes.
St. Michael's Cottage; 53.01207°N 0.96303°W	—	Early 19th century	The cottage is in rendered red brick on a plinth, with a floor band, a raised eaves band and a slate roof. There are two storeys and three bays, and two-storey wings and extensions at the rear. In the centre is a gabled porch with a tile roof and bargeboards, and a doorway with a fanlight. The windows are sashes, those in the ground floor under segmental arches.
Southfield Lodge; 53.01346°N 0.95893°W		c. 1830	The house, which is in painted brick with a slate roof and two storeys, was extended in the 20th century. The original part has three bays, the middle bay projecting, with three storeys and an attic, and a pyramidal roof, forming a turret. The outer bays are gabled with decorative bargeboards, and in the middle bay is a doorway and a gabled dormer, and the other windows are sashes. In front of the house is a lean-to verandah. The extension to the right is recessed and has two bays on a chamfered plinth. The bays are gabled with plain bargeboards, and the windows are sashes.
St Michael's Church; 53.01241°N 0.96034°W		1865	The church was rebuilt incorporating earlier material. It is in red brick with details in yellow brick and stone, and it has a roof of tile and pantile with coped gables. It consists of a nave, a north porch, a south vestry and a chancel. On the west gable apex is a gabled bell turret. The porch is gabled and timber framed, and the inner doorway has a 12th-century tympanum with a variety of carvings, including one of St Michael.
