= St James' Church, Halloughton =

Church in Halloughton, Nottinghamshire, England

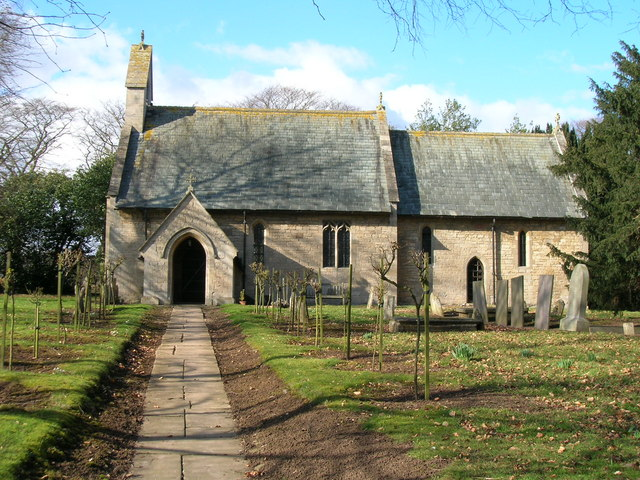
- St James' Church, Halloughton
- St James' Church, Halloughton
- 53°3′32.7″N 0°58′15.64″W
- OS grid reference: SK 69040 51810
- Location: Halloughton
- Country: England
- Denomination: Church of England

History
- Dedication: St James

Architecture
- Heritage designation: Grade II listed

Administration
- Diocese: Diocese of Southwell and Nottingham
- Archdeaconry: Newark
- Deanery: Newark and Southwell
- Parish: Halloughton

St James' Church, Halloughton is a Grade II listed parish church in the Church of England in Halloughton.

== History ==
The church dates from the 13th century. It was restored between 1879 and 1882 by Ewan Christian.

It is in a joint parish with:

- St Mary's Church, Bleasby
- St Michael's Church, Hoveringham
- Priory Church of St Peter, Thurgarton

== See also ==
- Listed buildings in Halloughton
