= Ethel Stokes =

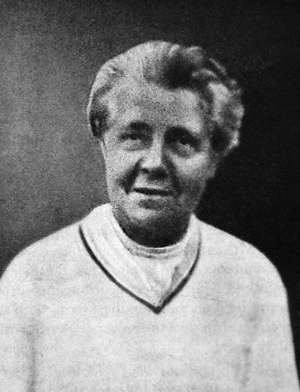
- in 1934 by unknown
- Born: 17 January 1870; Holloway
- Died: 19 October 1944 (aged 74); London
- Occupation: record preserver
- Employer: Public Record Office

Ethel Stokes (17 January 1870 – 19 October 1944) was a British (historic) record agent who played an integral role in establishing a system for preservation of local archives throughout England, and was involved in several major historical, literary and archival endeavours.

== Life ==
Stokes was born in 1870 in Holloway in London to Edwin James Stokes, a stockbroker's clerk, and Elizabeth ("Fanny") Augusta (née Baker). The family were middle-class, and lived at Finsbury in Central London. Her parents gave her a liberal education, telling her to travel where she wished and to read what she wanted to. As a result she had travelled around a lot in London by the age of twelve.

Stokes went to Ada Aubrey's school in Margate, Miss Sutton's Collegiate School at Highgate, and in 1885 to Notting Hill High School, where she did well academically, despite having no interest in attending university, which at any rate was not possible due to family circumstances. She then went to work at the Public Record Office in 1891. She had found her life's work. By 1900 she had a business, "Stokes & Cox", in Chancery Lane looking at records with her business partner and friend, Mary Cox, with whom she would live and work for 35 years. Her father had left her mother by 1911 and she was living with her mother and an aunt. In the 1911 census she described her job as "hunting up genealogies and other historical records in British Museum and other places". They worked in support of some biographers but they gained a lot of work investigating and documenting the necessary evidence to support claims to a British peerage.

Stokes became involved with The Complete Peerage though her association with Herbert Arthur Doubleday. Doubleday had initially been the publisher of the volumes as they were put together by Vicary Gibbs, but he became assistant editor until by volume six he was the lead editor. She had first worked with Doubleday on the Victoria History of the Counties of England. In the section on Essex, Stokes is the co-author of the section on Essex's political history.

She put together the Records Preservation Section of the British Records Association. Joan Wake said much later in 1954 that "If there is one person to whom historians of the present and the future should acknowledge their debt, that person is Ethel Stokes". Stokes had been aware that many documents were now thought to be redundant. From 1933 to 1939 she worked with volunteers to sort through 270 archives in London and then post them out to the growing number of local studies libraries in the provinces.

Stokes died in London in 1944 when she suffered a head injury after being hit by a lorry during the blackout. Mary Cox had died in 1936 from heart failure.
