= Listed buildings in Halloughton =

Halloughton is a civil parish in the Newark and Sherwood district of Nottinghamshire, England. The parish contains five listed buildings that are recorded in the National Heritage List for England. Of these, one is at Grade II*, the middle of the three grades, and the others are at Grade II, the lowest grade. The parish contains the village of Halloughton and the surrounding area. All the listed buildings are in the village, and consist of a farmhouse, farm buildings and a church.

== Key ==
Grade	Criteria
II*	Particularly important buildings of more than special interest
II	Buildings of national importance and special interest

== Buildings ==
Name and location	Photograph	Date	Notes	Grade
Halloughton Manor Farm House; 53.05854°N 0.97112°W		13th century	The farmhouse has been altered and extended through the centuries. The oldest part is a stone tower with some brick at the top, on a deep plinth, that has a pantile roof with brick coped gables and kneelers. There are three storeys and a single bay, and its openings include an arched doorway, a window with two ogee-headed lights, and a two-light mullioned casement window. Attached to the tower is a wing with a timber framed core, encased in red brick. To the right of this is an 18th-century wing in painted brick, with two storeys and five bays. On the front is a doorway with a hood, and sash windows.	II*
St James' Church; 53.05914°N 0.97129°W		13th century	The church was largely rebuilt in 1879–80 by Ewan Christian. It is in stone with slate roofs, and consists of a nave with a south porch, and a chancel with a north vestry. On the west gable is a bellcote with an arched opening.	II
Barn, Bridle Road Farm; 53.05663°N 0.97660°W		Late 18th century	The barn is in red brick on a plinth, with dogtooth and raised eaves, a pantile roof with brick coped gables and kneelers, and two storeys. There is a projecting porch with a catslide roof, and a lean-to extension at the rear. The barn contains cross and slit vents, and other openings, some blocked.	II
Pigeoncote, granary and stable block, Manor Farm; 53.05822°N 0.97119°W	—	Late 18th century	The farm buildings are in red brick, with dogtooth eaves, and a pantile roof with brick coped gables and kneelers. There are two storeys and a loft, and two bays. The buildings contain doorways, blocked entrances, a part flight of steps, the remains of seven flight perches, and blocked pigeon entrances.	II
Barn, Manor Farm; 53.05839°N 0.97178°W		Early 19th century	The barn is in red brick, with dogtooth and raised eaves and a pantile roof. There are two storeys and lofts, and five bays. The barn contains a large doorway, a stable door, a post box, an inscribed board, and slit vents.	II
