= Thurgarton railway station =

Grade II listed railway station in Thurgarton, England

Coordinates: 53°01′45″N 0°57′43″W

Thurgarton
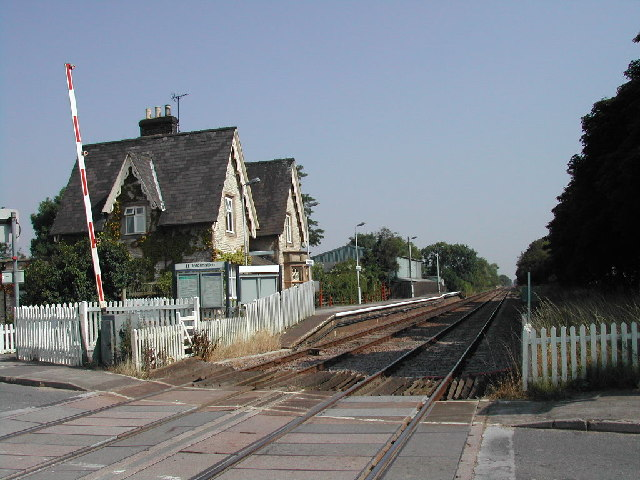

General information
- Location: Thurgarton, Newark and Sherwood; England
- Grid reference: SK697484
- Manager: East Midlands Railway
- Platforms: 2

Other information
- Station code: THU
- Classification: DfT category F2

History
- Opened: 3 August 1846

Passengers
- 2021/22: ▲1,728
- 2022/23: ▼1,584
- 2023/24: ▲2,518
- 2024/25: ▲3,204
- 2025/26: ▲4,430

Listed Building – Grade II
- Feature: Thurgarton Railway Station. Principal Passenger Buildings
- Designated: 21 November 1974
- Reference no.: 1179030
Location
Notes
- Passenger statistics from the Office of Rail and Road

Thurgarton railway station is a Grade II listed station which serves the small village of Thurgarton in Nottinghamshire, England.

== History ==
It is on the Nottingham to Lincoln Line, which was engineered by George Stephenson and opened by the Midland Railway on 3 August 1846. The contractors for the line were Craven and Son of Newark and Nottingham; the station buildings are in the neo-Tudor style and were probably designed by Thomas Chambers Hine.

At the station much of the original décor remains apart from the electric barriers added later.

=== Stationmasters ===
- J. Howitt 1846 - 1865
- C. Brown 1865 - 1866
- John Kind 1866 - 1898
- Job Frederick Fisher 1898 - 1921 (formerly station master at Bleasby)
- Sidney Richard Holden ca. 1924 - 1932 (afterwards station master at Ullesthorpe)
- J.F. Georgeson from 1937 (also station master at Lowdham)
- H. Simpson ca. 1950

== Facilities ==
The station is unstaffed and offers limited facilities other than two shelters, timetables and modern help points. The full range of tickets can be purchased from the guard on the train at no extra cost as there are no ticket issuing facilities at this station.

== Services ==
All services at Thurgarton are operated by East Midlands Railway.

The typical off-peak service is:

- 1 train every 2 hours to Crewe via Nottingham
- 1 train every 2 hours to Lincoln

Preceding station	National Rail	Following station
Lowdham	East Midlands Railway Nottingham to Lincoln Line	Bleasby

== See also ==
- Listed buildings in Thurgarton

== Gallery ==
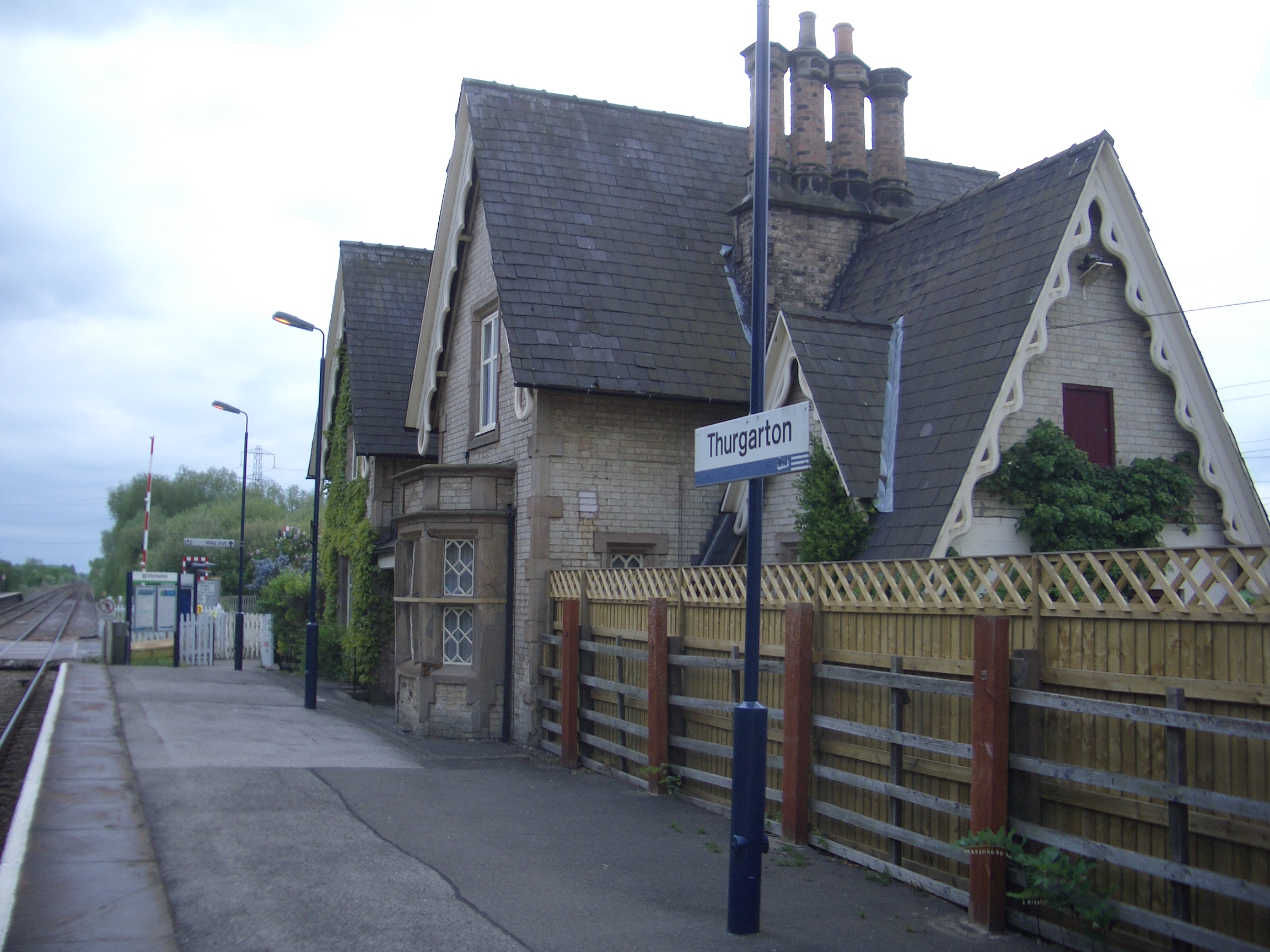
17 May 2008

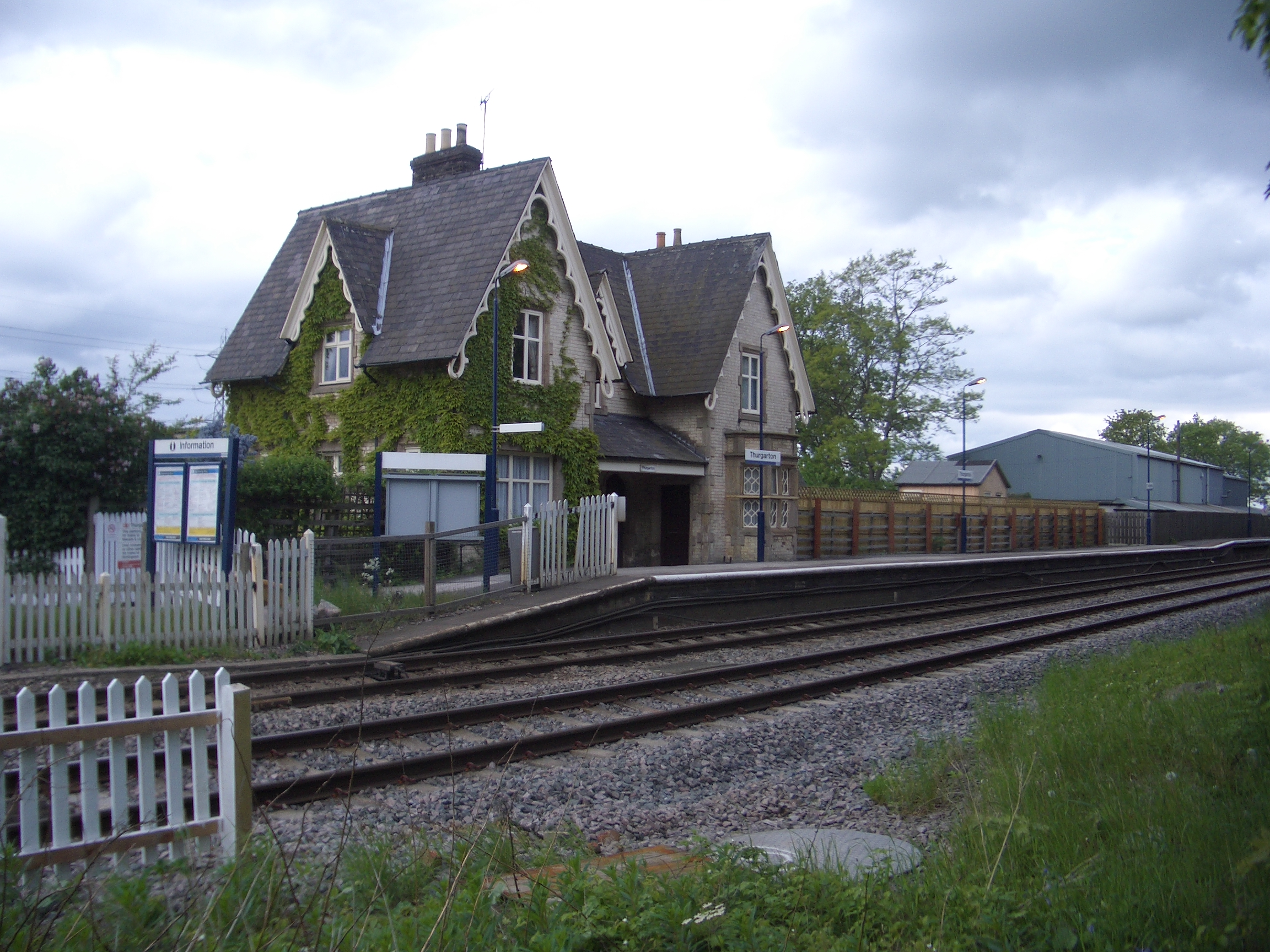
17 May 2008

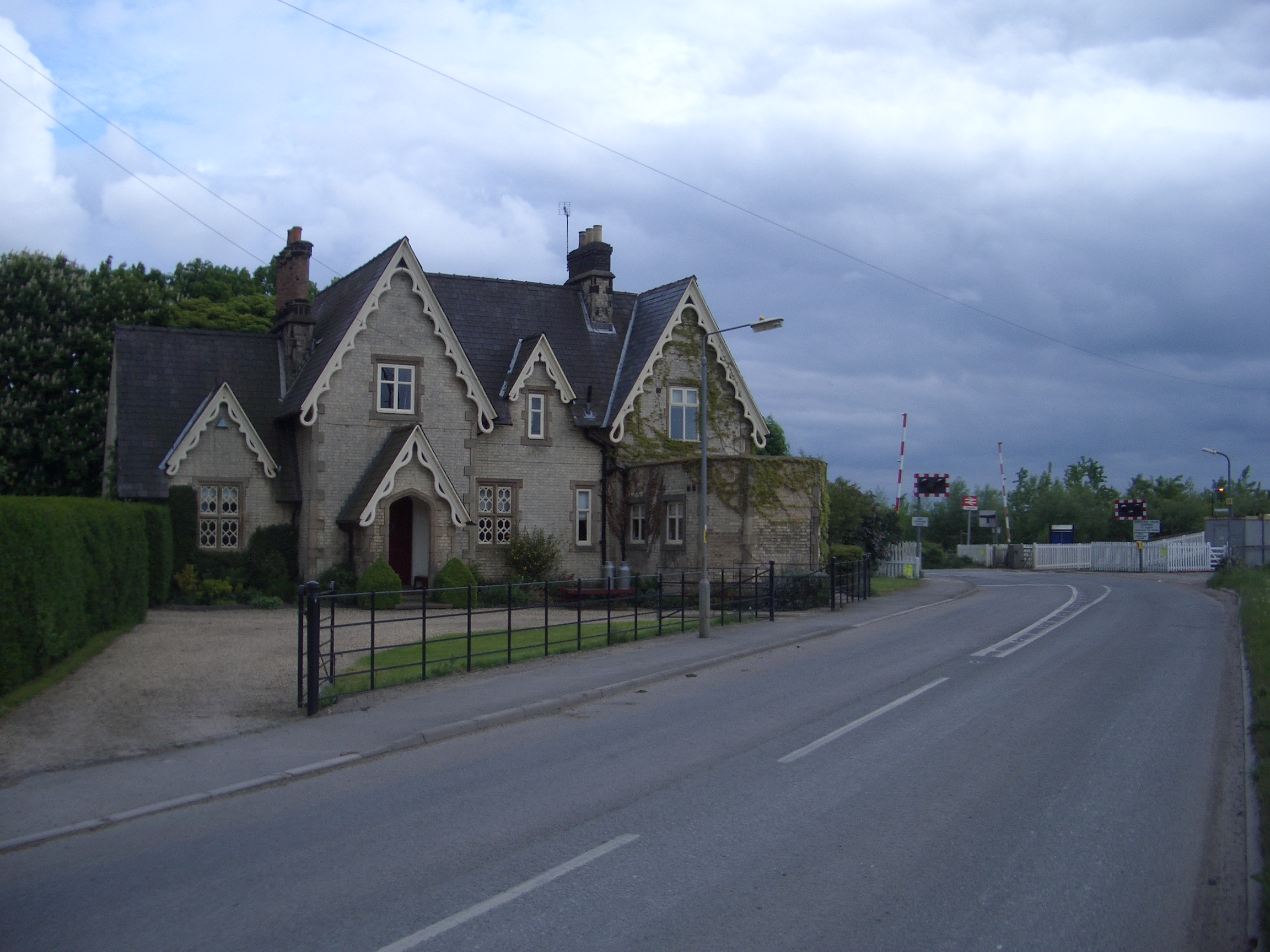
17 May 2008
