= Listed buildings in Thurgarton =

Thurgarton is a civil parish in the Newark and Sherwood district of Nottinghamshire, England. The parish contains eleven listed buildings that are recorded in the National Heritage List for England. Of these, one is listed at Grade I, the highest of the three grades, one is at Grade II*, the middle grade, and the others are at Grade II, the lowest grade. The parish contains the village of Thurgarton and the surrounding countryside. The most important listed buildings in the parish are a priory church and an associated house. The others consist of houses, cottages, farmhouses and farm buildings, a sheepwash and a footbridge, and a railway station.

== Key ==
Grade	Criteria
I	Buildings of exceptional interest, sometimes considered to be internationally important
II*	Particularly important buildings of more than special interest
II	Buildings of national importance and special interest

== Buildings ==
Name and location	Photograph	Date	Notes	Grade
Priory Church of St Peter; 53.03560°N 0.96986°W		13th century	The remains of the priory church were restored in 1853–54 by T. C. Hine, who also added a chancel. The church is built in stone with slate roofs, and it consists of a nave, a north aisle, a north porch, a chancel, and a northwest tower. The tower has six stages, bands, clasping buttresses, a west doorway, blind arcading, lancet windows, and an embattled parapet with the remains of four pinnacles.	I
Thurgarton Priory; 53.03537°N 0.96985°W		13th century	The house was built in 1777 over the undercroft of the priory, and has later been used for other purposes. It is in red brick with stone dressings, floor bands, and a hipped slate roof. There are two storeys and attics, and five bays, the middle bay projecting under a pediment, and flanking wings. In the centre is a porch with a moulded pediment, and a doorway with pilasters and a fanlight. The windows are sashes with moulded architraves and impost bands. In the middle floor of the central bay is a spaced Venetian window, and above it is a Diocletian window.	II*
The Old Sheepwash and footbridge 53.03816°N 0.99572°W		Late 17th century	The sheepwash and footbridge are in stone. The sheepwash has walls, steps and a trough, and the footbridge has a single arch and parapets.	II
Manor Farm House; 53.03474°N 0.96471°W	—	Mid 18th century	The farmhouse is in red brick, with a floor band, dentilled eaves, and a slate roof with brick coping and kneelers. There are two storeys and attics, and six bays. The windows are a mix of casements, and sashes, some horizontally-sliding, some under segmental arches. There are two doorways, one under a segmental arch, and the other flanked by a rusticated buttress.	II
Rose Cottage; 53.03742°N 0.96110°W		Mid 18th century	The cottage is in red brick, and has a pantile roof with brick coping and kneelers. There is a single storey and attics, and four bays, to the right is a lean-to, and at the rear is a single-storey outbuilding. The windows are casements with Gothic glazing, and above are sloping dormers.	II
Pigeoncote, stabling and granary, Manor Farm; 53.03480°N 0.96433°W	—	Late 18th century	The farm buildings are in stone and brick with pantile roofs. The pigeoncote has two storeys and a loft, and a single bay, and it contains three rows of pigeonholes and perches. The stabling and granary are later and lower, with two storeys and three bays. They have a flight of external steps, and contain doorways and vents.	II
Sycamore Cottage; 53.03409°N 0.96370°W		Late 18th century	The cottage is in red brick with dentilled eaves, and a pantile roof with a brick coped gable and kneelers on the left. There are two storeys and three bays, the left bay higher and recessed, and to the right is a single-storey single-bay wing. In the ground floor is a doorway and horizontally-sliding sash windows under segmental arches, and the upper floor contains one similar sash window and two small tripartite casements.	II
Hill Farm House; 53.04066°N 0.97689°W	—	Early 19th century	The farmhouse is in stone on a plinth, with quoins, floor bands, a moulded cornice, and a hipped slate roof. There are three storeys and three bays. Four steps lead up to a central doorway with pilasters, a fanlight with Gothic glazing, and a slightly projecting hood. The windows are sashes with moulded surrounds.	II
Maley Cottage; 53.03684°N 0.96233°W		Early 19th century	The cottage is in red brick with some stone and some render, and has dogtooth eaves and a tile roof. There is a single storey and an attic, and three bays, flanked by single storey extensions with pantile roofs. The central doorway has a stone hood mould, the ground floor windows are horizontally-sliding sashes, and in the attic are gabled dormers.	II
Cart shed, Manor Farm; 53.03441°N 0.96440°W		Early 19th century	The cart shed has a single storey and three bays, and is open on two sides. The gable walls are in stone, there are two red brick posts with stone caps, and a pantile roof.	II
Thurgarton railway station 53.02922°N 0.96208°W		1847	The railway station was built for the Nottingham–Lincoln line, and is in Tudor style. It is in yellow brick with stone dressings, quoins, and a slate roof with pierced and scalloped bargeboards. There are two storeys and attics, and three bays, the outer bays projecting and gabled, and a recessed single-storey single-bay extension to the right. On the platform front, the middle bay contains a doorway and a casement window with quoined surrounds, and over them is a sloping slate roof. The left bay contains a tripartite casement window, in the right bay is a polygonal bay window with a parapet, and the upper floor contains fixed lights.	II
