= Halloughton =

Village in Nottinghamshire

Coordinates: 53.057°N 0.974°W

- Hamlet and civil parish
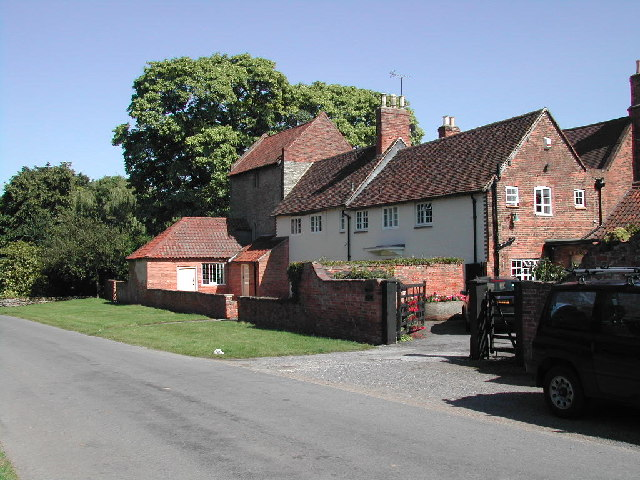
- Halloughton in 2005.

- Location within Nottinghamshire
- Interactive map of Halloughton
- Area: 1.54 sq mi (4.0 km^{2})
- Population: 65 (2021)
  - Density: 42/sq mi (16/km^{2})
- OS grid reference: SK 68756 51608
  - London: 110 mi (180 km) SSE
- District: Newark and Sherwood
- Shire county: Nottinghamshire
- Region: East Midlands
- Country: England
- Sovereign state: United Kingdom
- Post town: SOUTHWELL
- Postcode district: NG25
- Dialling code: 0115
- Police: Nottinghamshire
- Fire: Nottinghamshire
- Ambulance: East Midlands
- UK Parliament: Newark

Halloughton /ˈhælətən/ is a hamlet and civil parish in Nottinghamshire, England, 9 miles west of Newark-on-Trent. It lies in the district of Newark and Sherwood. Most of the property there was owned by the Church Commissioners until 1952. The resident population of the parish was 65 at the 2021 census.

== Historic buildings ==
The parish church of St James was rebuilt in 1879–1882. Halloughton Manor House is a 13th-century prebendal house of the college of Southwell. Its medieval tower house is now incorporated into a farmhouse built in the late 18th century.

Most of the farms and properties in the parish were owned by the Church Commissioners until 1952, when they were put for sale to their sitting tenants.

== Governance ==
Halloughton, as a small village, holds an annual parish meeting, rather than running a parish council. It lies in the district of Newark and Sherwood and the UK parliamentary constituency of Newark.

== Location and transport ==
The village stands at an altitude of about 65 metres (213 ft). Its population is included with Southwell's. It lies just to the north of Halloughton Dumble, a wooded valley, some 3 miles (5 km) from the River Trent at Bleasby.

Halloughton is on the main A612 road, with Nottingham (11 miles, 18 km) away and Southwell (3 miles, 5 km). It has regular daytime and evening bus services to both destinations. The nearest railway station is at Bleasby (2.5 miles, 4 km) on the Nottingham–Lincoln line.

== See also ==
- Listed buildings in Halloughton
