= Kathleen Major =

British historian & college principal

Kathleen Major FBA
- Born: 10 April 1906; London, England
- Died: 19 December 2000 (aged 94); Lincoln, England
- Title: Principal of St Hilda's College, Oxford (1955–1965)

Academic background
- Education: St Hilda's College, Oxford
- Academic advisor: F. M. Powicke
- Influences: V. H. Galbraith

Academic work
- Discipline: History
- Institutions: St Hilda's College, Oxford

Kathleen Major (10 April 1906 – 19 December 2000) was a British historian, and principal of St Hilda's College, Oxford, from 1955 to 1965. The Daily Telegraph called her "the foremost historian of the medieval cathedral and diocese of Lincoln".

Major was born on 10 April 1906 in Holloway, London, where her father George Major was a potato merchant. The success of her father's business led the family to move to Holbeach in Lincolnshire before the end of the First World War. She went up to Oxford in 1925 to read history.

Major received a bachelor's degree from St Hilda's College, Oxford, and after graduating she was the College Librarian until 1935. She was a fellow of the college from 1945. She began to assist F. M. Powicke in his work on Stephen Langton, Archbishop of Canterbury, working in many cathedral and diocesan archives in England and Wales. The archival research on Langton also took her to Lincoln Cathedral, where she met Canon C. W. Foster, the principal founder of both the Lincoln Record Society and the Lincoln Diocesan Record Office. In 1935, with the help of a strong reference from Frank Stenton, she was appointed chief officer of the Lincoln Diocesan Record Office, and from 1935 to 1975 she served as general editor of the Lincoln Record Society, combining the post with the secretaryship from 1935 to 1956. From the 1960s onwards, she produced a number of pamphlets for the Friends of Lincoln Cathedral. She was also an active member of the British Records Association. She died on 19 December 2000.

Academic offices
Preceded by Julia de Lacy Mann	Principal of St Hilda's College, Oxford; 1955–1965	Succeeded by Mary Bennett
