= The Complete Peerage =

Set of books by G. E. Cokayne and others

- 1910–1998
- Author: G. E. Cokayne et al.
- Language: English
- Genre: Genealogy
- Publisher: George Bell & Sons
- Publication place: United Kingdom of Great Britain and Ireland (From 1927, United Kingdom and Irish Free State)
- ISBN: 0-904387-82-8
- OCLC: 60066829
- Dewey Decimal: 929.7/2 19
- LC Class: CS421 .C7 1982

The Complete Peerage (full title: The Complete Peerage of England, Scotland, Ireland, Great Britain, and the United Kingdom Extant, Extinct, or Dormant); first edition by George Edward Cokayne, Clarenceux King of Arms; 2nd edition revised by Vicary Gibbs et al.; 3rd edition in progress) is a comprehensive work on the titled aristocracy of the British Isles.

== History ==
The Complete Peerage was first published in eight volumes between 1887 and 1898 by George Edward Cokayne (G. E. C.).

This version was effectively replaced by a new and enlarged edition between 1910 and 1959, edited successively by Vicary Gibbs (Cokayne's nephew), H. A. (Herbert Arthur) Doubleday, Duncan Warrand, Lord Howard de Walden, Geoffrey H. White and R. S. Lea. The revised edition, published by the St Catherine Press Limited, was in twelve volumes, with volume twelve issued in two parts.

Volume thirteen was issued in 1940, not as part of the alphabetical sequence, but as a supplement covering creations and promotions within the peerage between 1900 and 1938. The leading researcher on the project was Ethel Stokes and the five volumes from 1929 to 1949 acknowledge her major contribution.

The work has been reprinted in a number of formats, most notably by Alan Sutton Publishers who reduced it in size to six volumes in a photographically reduced format. This contains four page images on each smaller page.

It was available on CD. A further reprint in six volumes appeared in 2000, together with Volume 14, which is an appendix, correcting the original publication (1910–1938) and briefly updating it to 1995.

A fully revised and modernised third edition in 18 volumes is due to be published by Alan Sutton Publishing between 2025 and 2027, with an online edition to become available on a subscription basis in 2027.

== Volumes ==
=== 1st edition ===
Volume	Pub date	Additional material
I. A to Bo	1887	Page ix – Irish Peerage, &c. before the Sixteenth Century
II. Bra to C	1889	
III. D to F	1890	
IV. G to K	1892	Page i – Papal dispensations referring to Scotland
V. L to M	1893	
VI. N to R	1895	
VII. S to T	1896	
VIII. U to Z, appendix, corrigenda, occurrences after 1 January 1898, and general index to notes, &c.	1898	

All volumes edited by George Cokayne.

=== 2nd edition ===
Volume	Pub date	Editors	Additional material
I. Ab-Adam to Basing	1910	Hon. Vicary Gibbs	Appendix A – page 457 – Some observations on early Irish Baronies; Appendix B – page 465 – The dukedom of Châtellerault; Appendix C – page 469 – Precedency of peers in Parliament by Royal prerogative Appendix D – page 472 – Precedency anomalously allowed Appendix E – page 475 – Scottish peerages forfeited after the Risings of 1715 and 1745, and subsequent restorations Appendix F – page 480 – Jacobite Peerages; Appendix G – page 490 – Eldest sons of peers summoned to Parliament v.p. in one of their father's peerages Appendix H – page 496 – Amusements of men of fashion in 1782; Appendix I – page 499 – Politics of Peers; Appendix J – page 503 – Grant of the Comté of Aumale to Richard, Earl of Warwick
II. Bass to Canning	1912	Hon. Vicary Gibbs	Appendix A – page 525 – The Loyalists Bloody Roll; Appendix B – page 527 – The Order Of The Garter; Appendix C – page 597 – The Battle Of Boroughbridge; Appendix D – page 603 – The Great Offices Of State; Appendix E – page 649 – Officers Of The College Of Arms; Appendix F – page 651 – Coronation Peerages; Appendix G – page 656 – Lord Lieutenants Dismissed By James II; Appendix H – page 658 – Principal Persons In Arms For The Prince Of Orange
III. Canonteign to Cutts	1913	Hon. Vicary Gibbs with the assistance of H. A. Doubleday	Appendix A – page 589 – Surrender of peerages in England; Appendix B – page 592 – A list of peers and heirs apparent of peers who served in the South African War of 1899–1902; Appendix C – page 597 – Some observations on medieval names Appendix D – page 631 – Peers present in and absent from James II's Irish parliament of 7 May 1689; Appendix E – page 635 – Peerage titles chosen to commemorate foreign achievements Appendix F – page 637 – Special remainders granted to commoners Appendix G – page 639 – Peers and peeresses converted to the Roman Catholic faith since 1850; Appendix H – page 642 – Profuse creations and promotions in the Irish peerage Appendix I – page 648 – Peers who voted against the third reading of the Reform Bill
IV. Dacre to Dysart	1916	Hon. Vicary Gibbs with the assistance of H. A. Doubleday	Appendix A – page 571 – Peers (present or future) included in "Fox's Martyrs" at the election of 1784; Appendix B – page 573 – Peers who were commanders or captains in the Commonwealth armies Appendix C – page 575 – The greatest estates in Ireland in 1799; Appendix D – page 576 – Earldoms created by Stephen and the Empress Maud; Appendix E – page 580 – Courtesy titles Appendix F – page 583 – Peers who have been Presidents of the Union Societies at Oxford and Cambridge; Appendix G – page 585 – The Protectorate House of Lords, commonly known as Cromwell's "Other House," 1657–1659; Appendix H – page 651 – Earldoms and baronies in history and in law, and the doctrine of abeyance Appendix I – page 761 – Peverel of Nottingham; Appendix J – page 772 – The entail of the Desmond lands in 1342/3
V. Eardley of Spalding to Goojerat	1921/6	Hon. Vicary Gibbs with the assistance of H. A. Doubleday	Appendix A – page 753 – Persons who are said to have been summoned to Parliament in right of their wives Appendix B – page 776 – Consolation peerages conferred on members and candidates defeated at the polls 1833–1900; Appendix C – page 780 – Peers who were directors of companies in 1896 and 1920; Appendix D – page 784 – The Battle of Flodden; Appendix E – page 785 – Peerages created by Charles II while in exile Appendix F – page 787 – Peerage titles assumed by peers Appendix G – page 792 – Titles conferred on children or male issue of the sovereigns of England; Appendix H – page 798 – The title of Marquess; Appendix I – page 800 – A note on the Fitzwarin peerage case Appendix J – page 802 – The petition of Reynold West, Lord la Warre
VI. Gordon to Hurstpierpoint	1926	H. A. Doubleday, Duncan Warrand and Lord Howard de Walden	Appendix A – page 689 – The use of the particle "de" in titles Appendix B – page 694 – The Field of Cloth of Gold; Appendix C – page 697 – Claims to the baronies of Grey (of Powis) and Cherleton; Appendix D – page 702 – The barony of Hastings of Hungerford; Appendix E – page 704 – Some examination of the grounds for the decision of the Lords in the case of the earldom of Norfolk; Appendix F – page 706 – Bastards of Charles II; Appendix G – page 709 – Dates of English parliaments before 1500 in writs to which baronies by writ now existing have their origin Appendix B – page 713 – Peers holding above 100,000 acres in 1883
VII. Husee to Lincolnshire	1929	H. A. Doubleday and Lord Howard de Walden	Appendix A – page 703 – Baronies created by patent or charter before the sixteenth century Appendix B – page 704 – The Lordship of the Isle of Wight; Appendix C – page 705 – The Barony of Berkeley; Appendix D – page 708 – The ancestors of Simon de Montfort, Earl of Leicester; Appendix E & F - page 718 - Limitations to "heirs male" Appendix G – page 734 – Peerage titles of a higher grade held without a barony Appendix H – page 735 – Claims to the barony of Delvin; Appendix I – page 737 – Waleran, Count of Meulan, and his successors Appendix J – page 743 – The Countess Lucy; Appendix K – page 747 – Attempted French invasion of Scotland, 1708
VIII. Lindley to Moate	1932	H. A. Doubleday and Lord Howard de Walden	Appendix A – page 721 – The ducal title in the British Isles; Appendix B – page 749 – A note on the representation of the family of Keith; Appendix C – page 751 – Life peerages Appendix D – page 754 – Margaret Fleming; Appendix E – page 757 – Surnames of foreign dynasties Appendix F – page 759 – Peers and sons of peers who served in the Great War, 1914–18; Appendix G – page 827 – Some observations on the two earldoms of Mar
IX. Moels to Nuneham	1936	H. A. Doubleday and Lord Howard de Walden	[Appendices are on separately numbered pages in Volumes IX to XII] Appendix A – page 3 – A note on the relationship between the families of Mortimer and Warenne; Appendix B – page 8 – English baronies created by Henry III; Appendix C – page 23 – Cardinal Beton's secret bond Appendix D – page 25 – The ancestry of Sir Edward Montagu of Boughton, Chief Justice of the King's Bench 1539; Appendix E – page 30 – Observations on the baronies of Montagu and Monthermer; Appendix F – page 44 – A note on the creation of the barony of Monteagle; Appendix G – page 45 – Some observations on the Mowbray and Segrave case of 1877; Appendix H – page 58 – The Lords Morley and the Marshalcy of Ireland; Appendix I – page 61 – The Montmorency pedigree and the family of Morres; Appendix J – page 75 – The Mar case
X. Oakham to Richmond	1945	H. A. Doubleday and Lord Howard de Walden	Appendix A – page 3 – Norse predecessors of the Earls of Orkney; Appendix B – page 32 – The Earldom of Carrick; Appendix C – page 35 – Creation-charters of Irish Earldoms; Appendix D – page 40 – The Earldom of Ormond; Appendix E – page 45 – The restoration of the Earldom of Oxford in 1393; Appendix F – page 47 – The office of Lord Great Chamberlain of England; Appendix G – page 91 – The rise of the Marshal; Appendix H – page 100 – The families of the first and second Earls of Pembroke; Appendix I – page 105 – Creation and investitutre Appendix J – page 110 – The early Veres; Appendix K – page 121 – Remainders in the creation-charters of 14th-century Earldoms; Appendix L – page 127 – The succession to the Earldom of Pembroke; Appendix M – page 130 – Secret service payments to the Duchess of Portsmouth; Appendix N – page 132 – The Flodden augmentation
XI Rickerton to Sisonby	1949	G. H. White	Appendix A – page 2 – The Irish peerage before 1500; Appendix B – page 7 – The Battle of Bannock Burn; Appendix C – page 39 – Heralds of the nobility Appendix D – page 105 – Henry I's illegitimate children Appendix E – page 122 – Marshals under the Conqueror; Appendix F – page 126 – The Earldoms of Wiltshire and Salisbury; Appendix G – page 133 – The Plantagenet enamel at Le Mans; Appendix H – page 143 – Soi-disant Scottish peers: Ruthven and Rutherford; Appendix I – page 148 – The Baronies of Saye and Sele; Appendix J – page 152 – The descent of Scales; Appendix K – page 155 – The date of the creation of the Earldom of Shrewsbury
XII (part 1) Skelmersdale to Towton	1953	G. H. White	Appendix A – page 2 – Baronies by writ Appendix B – page 4 – "Tête-à-tête portraits" in The Town and Country Magazine; Appendix C – page 5 – Peers who married actresses, singers or dancers Appendix D – page 6 – Slane peerage case, 1830–35 "The case of George Bryan, Esq."; Appendix E – page 8 – The descent of the Barony of Spynie; Appendix F – page 11 – Nicholas de Stafford and Nicholas the Sheriff; Appendix G – page 14 – The soi-disant Earls of Stirling; Appendix H – page 18 – The succession to the Barony of Strange (of Blackmere); Appendix I – page 21 – The sons of John (de la Pole), 2nd Duke of Suffolk, by Elizabeth (of York), sister of Edward IV and Richard III; Appendix J – page 26 – The Warenne group of checkered shields Appendix K – page 30 – The Conqueror's brothers and sisters Appendix L – page 35 – The Battle of Hastings and the death of Harold
XII (part 2) Tracton to Zouche	1959	G. H. White	Appendix A – page 2 – The Norman Earls of Warwick; Appendix B – page 7 – The origin of Eustace FitzJohn; Appendix C – page 12 – The soi-disant Earls of Tyrone; Appendix D – page 14 – The creation of the Barony of Wharton in 1544; Appendix E – page 18 – The soi-disant Earls of Wigtown; Appendix F – page 20 – Peers and sons of peers who have won the Victoria Cross; Appendix G – page 25 – Portraits at Gorhambury; Appendix H – page 26 – The alleged attainder of the Duke of Berwick-upon-Tweed; Appendix I – page 29 – The early heraldry of de Quency; Appendix J – page 32 – The Princes in the Tower; Appendix K – page 40 – Problems of the Bayeux Tapestry; Appendix L – page 45 – Claims to the alleged Barony of Wahull
XIII. Peers created 1901 to 1938	1940	H. A. Doubleday and Lord Howard de Walden	Appendix A – page 609 – The ancestry of Viscount Nuffield; Appendix B – page 613 – Lord Nuffield's gifts of £25,000 and upwards
XIV. Addenda & corrigenda	1998	Peter W. Hammond	

Volumes 1–5 have the title Complete peerage of England, Scotland, Ireland, Great Britain and the United Kingdom, extant, extinct or dormant, and volumes 6–13: The complete peerage; or, A history of the House of lords and all its members from the earliest times.

== See also ==
- Burke's Peerage
