= Thorpe in the Fallows =

Small hamlet and civil parish in the West Lindsey district of Lincolnshire, England

Coordinates: 53.314931°N 0.632524°W

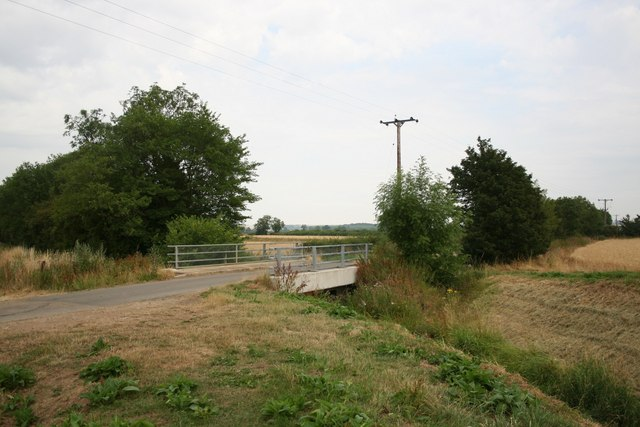
- Bridge at Thorpe in the Fallows

- Location within Lincolnshire
- OS grid reference: SK912806
  - London: 125 mi (201 km) S
- District: West Lindsey
- Shire county: Lincolnshire
- Region: East Midlands
- Country: England
- Sovereign state: United Kingdom
- Post town: Lincoln
- Postcode district: LN1
- Police: Lincolnshire
- Fire: Lincolnshire
- Ambulance: East Midlands
- UK Parliament: Gainsborough

Thorpe in the Fallows, also known as Thorpe le Fallows, is a small hamlet and civil parish in the West Lindsey district of Lincolnshire, England, approximately 6 miles (10 km) north from the city and county town of Lincoln. It has sometimes been called "West Thorpe", with the nearby parish of Aisthorpe known as "East Thorpe". The population of the hamlet is included in the civil parish of Stow.

The area surrounding the existing hamlet is scheduled and includes the earthwork remains of the larger medieval village, which was established before the late 11th century. Documentary evidence for a church first occurs in the mid-12th century. Following the Dissolution in the 16th century, the parish came under the ownership of the Dean of Lincoln, and in the 17th and 18th centuries the village gradually became depopulated. The church, which was dedicated to Saint Mary Magdalen, was demolished early in the 17th century. A war memorial marks the site of the church, located within a rectangular enclosure representing the churchyard, the remains of the church survive as buried building foundations.
