= St Mary's Church, Bleasby =

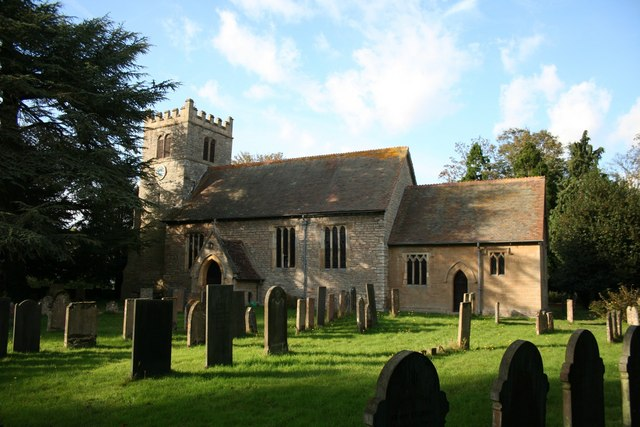
- St Mary's Church, Bleasby
- St Mary's Church, Bleasby
- 53°2′19.63″N 0°55′54.55″W
- OS grid reference: SK 71766 49580
- Location: Bleasby, Nottinghamshire
- Country: England
- Denomination: Church of England

History
- Dedication: St Mary

Architecture
- Heritage designation: Grade II listed

Administration
- Diocese: Diocese of Southwell and Nottingham
- Archdeaconry: Newark
- Deanery: Newark and Southwell
- Parish: Bleasby

St Mary's Church, Bleasby is a Grade II listed parish church in the Church of England in Bleasby, Nottinghamshire.

== History ==
The church dates from the 13th century. It was restored in 1853, and again in 1869 by Ewan Christian.

It is in a joint parish with:

- St James' Church, Halloughton
- St Michael's Church, Hoveringham
- Priory Church of St. Peter, Thurgarton

== Organ ==
The organ dates from 1863 by Gray & Davison. A specification of the organ can be found on the National Pipe Organ Register.

== See also ==
- Listed buildings in Bleasby, Nottinghamshire
