= Goverton =

Coordinates: 53.04°N 0.95°W

- Location within Nottinghamshire
- OS grid reference: SK704500
- District: Newark and Sherwood
- Shire county: Nottinghamshire
- Region: East Midlands
- Country: England
- Sovereign state: United Kingdom
- Post town: BLEASBY
- Postcode district: NG14
- Dialling code: 01636
- Police: Nottinghamshire
- Fire: Nottinghamshire
- Ambulance: East Midlands
- UK Parliament: Newark

Goverton is a village in Nottinghamshire, England in the civil parish of Bleasby(where population details are included). It is located 3 miles (5 km) south of Southwell.
