= Lincolnshire Archives =

Coordinates: 53.2293°N 0.5346°W

Lincolnshire Archives is the county record office of Lincolnshire, England. It was established as a county service in 1948 by the Lincolnshire Archives Committee, which had been formally constituted on 24 October 1947 with Sir Robert Pattinson as chairman. The Times, surveying the trend towards County Record Offices at the end of 1948, reported Lincolnshire as a "notable recent development": "the three county councils of the shire, the Diocese of Lincoln, the Dean and Chapter, and the city council are combining to convert the austerely beautiful building, the old gaol at Lincoln, into a joint record office for all six." The first County Archivist, Joan Varley, delivered her first annual report in spring 1949. Assistant archivist from 1948 to 1958 was Dorothy Owen; she was succeeded as Varley's deputy by Mary Finch, who would herself become County Archivist in 1982.

The service is now part of the Culture department of Lincolnshire County Council and is housed in modern offices in St Rumbold Street, Lincoln.
