= Bleasby railway station =

Railway station in Nottinghamshire, England

Coordinates: 53°2′30″N 0°56′36″W

Bleasby
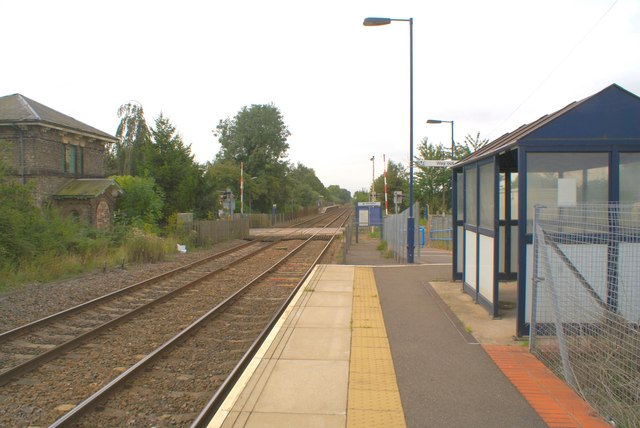

General information
- Location: Bleasby, Newark and Sherwood, Nottinghamshire; England
- Grid reference: SK709499
- Owner: Network Rail
- Manager: East Midlands Railway
- Platforms: 2

Other information
- Station code: BSB
- Classification: DfT category F2

Passengers
- 2021/22: ▲3,742
- 2022/23: ▲5,284
- 2023/24: ▲6,298
- 2024/25: ▲7,552
- 2025/26: ▲9,162
Location
Notes
- Passenger statistics from the Office of Rail and Road

Bleasby railway station serves the village of Bleasby, Nottinghamshire, England. It is on the Nottingham to Lincoln Line, owned by Network Rail and managed by East Midlands Railway.

== History ==
The station was opened on 4 August 1846 by the Midland Railway. The original station buildings were designed by Thomas Chambers Hine. The station was taken over by the London, Midland and Scottish Railway in 1923, and by British Rail in 1948.

It is now managed by East Midlands Railway.

=== Stationmasters ===
- George Williamson ca. 1857 - 1886
- James B. Palmer 1886 - 1891
- Job Frederick Fisher 1891 - 1898 (formerly station master at Bolsover Castle, afterwards station master at Thurgarton)
- Arthur Edward Kind 1898 - 1899 (afterwards station master at Collingham)
- Ebenezer Tagg 1900 - 1904
- George Ernest Aiers 1904 - 1907(afterwards station master at Lowdham)
- George Butler from 1907 (formerly station master at Lowdham)
- George Stapleton ca. 1911
- G.W. Jay ca. 1914
- J.J. Williams from 1921
- Mr. Holden until 1932 (afterwards station master at Ullesthorpe)
- William George Dudderidge 1932 - 1936 (also station master at Rolleston Junction and Fiskerton)
- Arnold Foster 1936 - 1942
- H.J. Lane until 1947
- F.W.E. Clarke from 1947 (formerly stationmaster at Widmerpool)

== Facilities ==
The station is unstaffed and offers limited facilities other than two shelters, bicycle storage, timetables and modern help points. The full range of tickets can be purchased from the guard on the train at no extra cost as there are no retail facilities at this station.

== Gallery ==
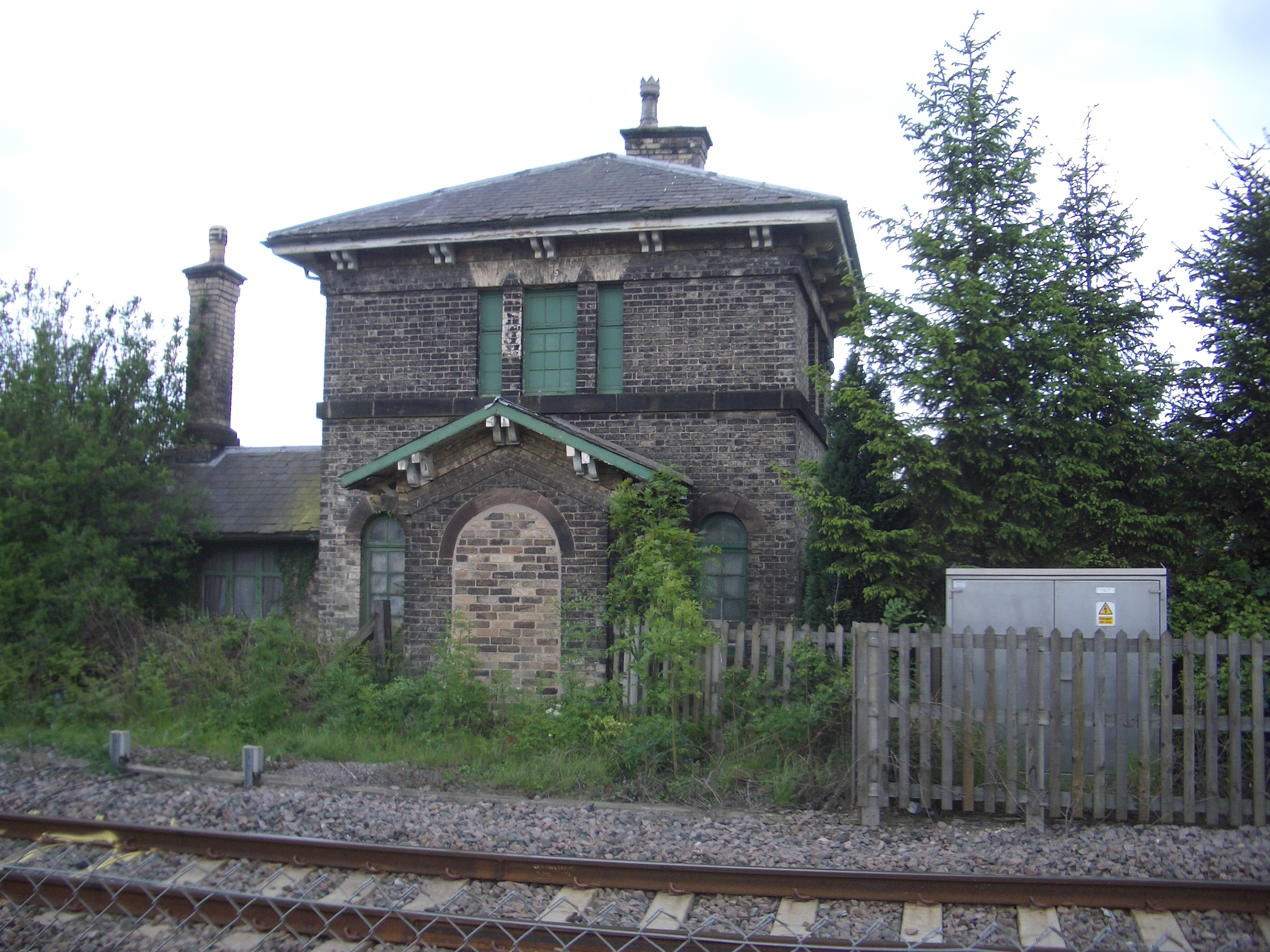

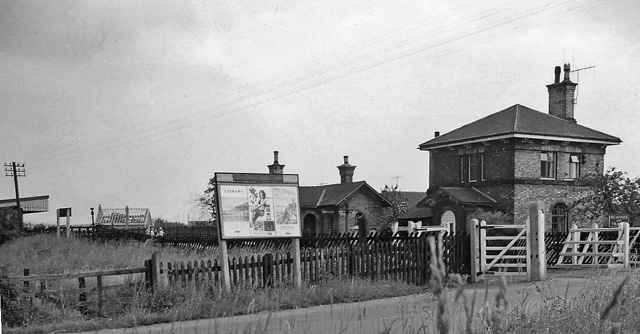
The station in 1963

== Services ==
All services at Bleasby are operated by East Midlands Railway.

The typical off-peak service is:

- 1 train every 2 hours to Crewe via Nottingham
- 1 train every 2 hours to Lincoln

Preceding station	National Rail	Following station
Thurgarton	East Midlands Railway Nottingham to Lincoln Line	Fiskerton
