= British Records Association =

British learned society

- Abbreviation: BRA
- Formation: 1932
- Type: Learned society
- Registration no.: 227464
- Legal status: Charity
- Location: London, United Kingdom
- Region served: United Kingdom
- Patron: The Marquess of Salisbury
- President: Sir Geoffrey Vos, Master of the Rolls
- Chairman: Julia Sheppard
- Website: https://www.britishrecordsassociation.org.uk/

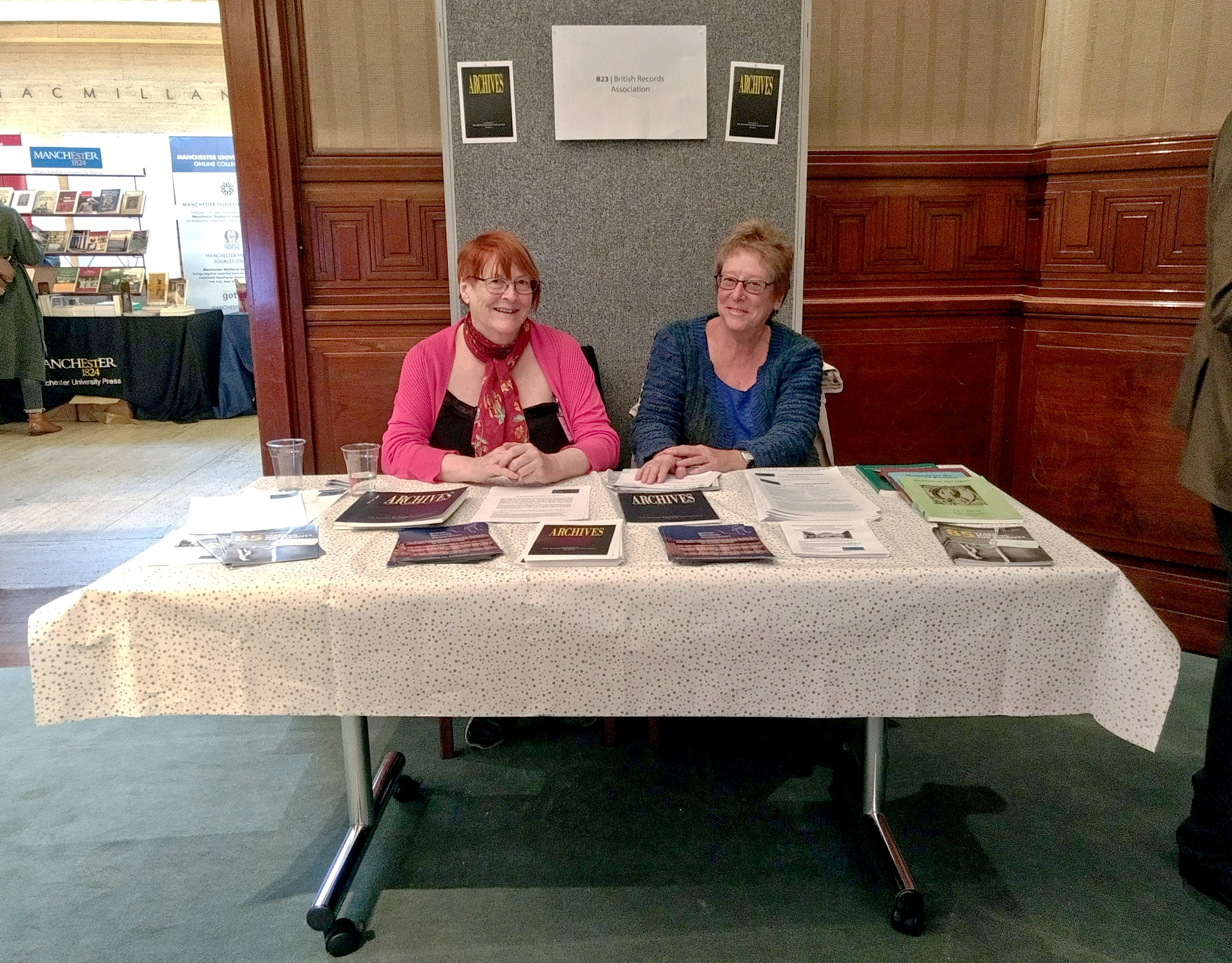
British Records Association at the School of Advanced Study History Day, 2017

The British Records Association (widely known as the BRA, pronounced as three letters) is a British learned society founded in 1932 to promote the preservation, understanding, accessibility and study of historic records and archives. It is a registered charity (no. 227464). It issues a journal, Archives, and other publications; hosts conferences and seminars; and undertakes other activities to promote the care and preservation of archives and the interests of archive users at a national level. Membership is open to all, and the association (in contrast to exclusively scholarly bodies, and exclusively professional bodies) therefore plays a particular role as a forum which brings together owners of archives, academic and amateur documentary researchers, archivists and librarians, and institutions and societies concerned with archives.

== History ==
The association was formally founded in 1932, but it took over the Records Preservation Section established three years earlier in 1929 by the British Record Society (see below). The similarity of name between the two bodies was a deliberate choice, made in order to emphasise continuity.

The formation of the new association – and its not entirely amicable split from the BRS – was largely the initiative of (Sir) Hilary Jenkinson. He remained the BRA's guiding force for nearly 30 years. From 1930 to 1932 he had served as Secretary of the Drafting Committee which established the association; and he subsequently served as its Joint Honorary Secretary 1932–47; Chairman of the Records Preservation Section 1947–61; Vice-President of the association 1954–61; and as a member of most of its committees. Other active members in the early years included G. H. Fowler, Joan Wake, Ethel Stokes, Irene Churchill, Kathleen Major, William Le Hardy, and H. M. Cashmore.

Prior to the establishment of the Society of Local Archivists in 1947, the BRA was the closest that Britain had to a professional association for archivists, and it played a central role in laying down professional standards and principles, and in promoting the establishment of professionally staffed local archive services in the post-War years.

During the Second World War, when the British government promoted a salvage campaign to encourage the recycling of waste paper, the BRA ran a vigorous counter-campaign to safeguard against the over-enthusiastic destruction of records of historical value. In 1943, it produced a report on British Records after the War, which proposed legislation to control local and private archives. Although most of its proposals proved to be too draconian for general acceptance, they did lead to the establishment of the National Register of Archives in 1945.

From 1974 to 1992, the BRA's administrative secretary was the former Soviet spy John Vassall, who, following his release from prison, had begun a new life under the name John Phillips.

== Presidency ==
By tradition, the president of the association is the Master of the Rolls of the day. At the time of the BRA's foundation, and until 1958, the Master of the Rolls was also Keeper of Public Records, and nominal head of the Public Record Office. Under the Public Records Act 1958, responsibility for public records was transferred from the Master of the Rolls to the Lord Chancellor; but the BRA chose not to follow this lead. The current president is therefore Sir Geoffrey Vos.

== Publications ==
=== Journal ===
The association has published a journal, Archives, twice-yearly since 1949. It is peer-reviewed, and contains a range of articles relating to the history, preservation, accessibility and use of archives, historical case-studies drawing heavily on archival research, and discussions of archival trends, theories and practices. It also carries reports and reviews of recent archival publications, web sites, exhibits and events. Since 2019, the journal has been published on behalf of the Association by Liverpool University Press.

The journal's editors have been: Roger Ellis, 1949–57; Joan Lancaster, 1957–63; Arthur Owen, 1964–76; Andrew Cook, 1977–84; John Warner-Davies/Davies, 1985–89; Jeremy Black, 1990–2005; Ruth Paley, 2006–date.

=== Archives and the User ===
Since 1970, the association has published a series of handbooks providing introductory guides to historical documentary sources for researchers and editors, under the series title "Archives and the User". Titles published to date are:

- Owen, Dorothy M. (1970). The Records of the Established Church in England. Archives and the User. Vol. 1. London: British Records Association.
- Hunnisett, R. F. (1972). Indexing for Editors. Archives and the User. Vol. 2. London: British Records Association. ISBN 0-900222-02-6.
- Harvey, John H. (1974). Sources for the History of Houses. Archives and the User. Vol. 3. London: British Records Association. ISBN 0-900222-04-2.
- Hunnisett, R. F. (1977). Editing Records for Publication. Archives and the User. Vol. 4. London: British Records Association. ISBN 0-900222-05-0.
- Harvey, P. D. A. (1984). Manorial Records. Archives and the User. Vol. 5. London: British Records Association. ISBN 0-900222-06-9.
- Prochaska, Alice (1986). Irish History from 1700: a Guide to Sources in the Public Record Office. Archives and the User. Vol. 6. London: British Records Association. ISBN 0-900222-07-7.
- Stephens, W. B.; Unwin, R. W. (1987). Materials for the Local and Regional History of Schooling. Archives and the User. Vol. 7. London: British Records Association. ISBN 0-900222-08-5.
- Mullett, Michael (1991). Sources for the History of English Nonconformity. Archives and the User. Vol. 8. London: British Records Association. ISBN 0-900222-09-3.
- Creaton, Heather (1998). Sources for the History of London, 1939-45: a Guide and Bibliography. Archives and the User. Vol. 9. London: British Records Association. ISBN 0-900222-12-3.
- Alcock, N. W. (2003). Documenting the History of Houses. Archives and the User. Vol. 10. London: British Records Association. ISBN 0-900222-14-X.
- New, Elizabeth (2010). Seals and Sealing Practices. Archives and the User. Vol. 11. London: British Records Association. ISBN 978-0-900222-15-3.

=== Other publications ===
The association publishes a twice-yearly newsletter (from 2011, in electronic form). It has from time to time issued other occasional publications, including memoranda on good practice; and conference proceedings.

== Conferences and meetings ==
The BRA holds an annual one-day conference, focusing on a particular thematic area of historical records. Until 2017, the conference was normally held in late November or early December; but the decision was then taken to schedule the next conference for Spring 2019 (no conference being held in 2018).

The annual Maurice Bond Memorial Lecture, named after the former Clerk of the House of Lords Record Office, is held in the late autumn (normally October) in conjunction with the association's AGM, and is delivered by a speaker prominent in the world of scholarship, record-keeping or politics. Recent Maurice Bond Lecturers have included Clyde Jeavons, formerly of the National Film and Television Archive (2005), Nicholas Rodger (2006), Nicholas Kingsley of The National Archives (2007), Bamber Gascoigne (2008), Richard Horton, editor-in-chief of The Lancet (2009), Frank Prochaska (2010), Michael Meadowcroft, MP (2011), Peter Hennessy (2012), Professor Eric Ketelaar (2013), Jeremy Musson (2014), Fiona Skillen (2015), Caroline Shenton (2016), Joan Winterkorn (2017), Martin Daunton (2021), Andrew Flynn (2023).

The association also holds other occasional conferences, seminars and training sessions. During the Covid-19 pandemic, it held a series of webinars discussing truth and the archival record, in partnership with the Institute of Historical Research.

== Harley Prize ==
In 2018, the association established the annual Harley Prize in memory of Janette Harley (1951–2015). The prize, of £500, is awarded for the best or most original piece of work published in any media in the previous three years which has met the aims of the association in promoting the preservation, understanding, accessibility or study of archives.

== Records Preservation Section ==
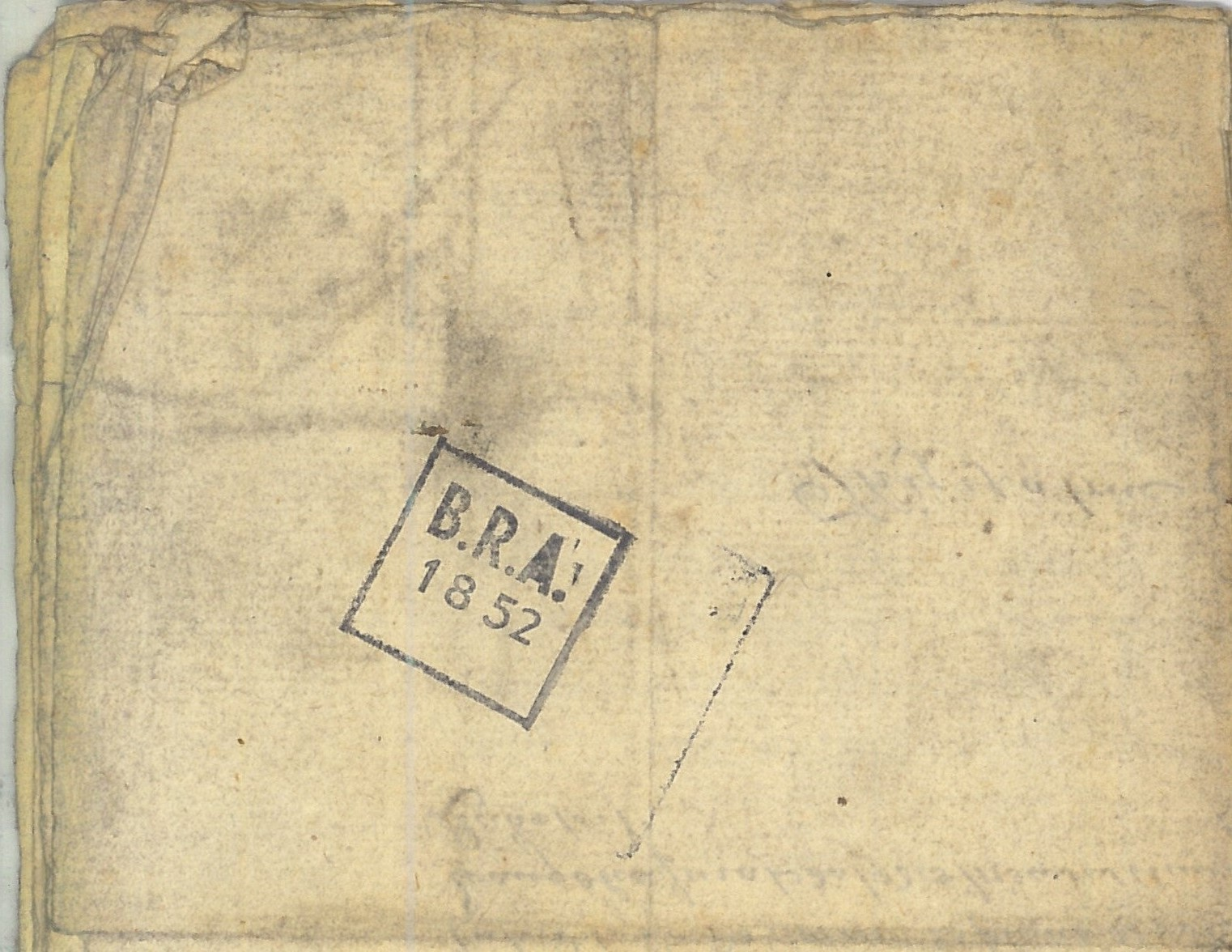
BRA stamp on a historic document, showing that it has passed through the hands of the Records Preservation Section. The number indicates its earlier provenance.

The Records Preservation Section (RPS; originally Records Preservation Committee, or Records Preservation Branch) was established under the auspices of the British Record Society in 1929, in the aftermath of the Law of Property Act 1922 and the Land Registration Act 1925, both of which rendered certain classes of historical property record redundant for legal purposes, and so at risk of destruction. It was partly inspired by (though not directly modelled on) the example of the National Art Collections Fund. Its responsibilities and assets were formally transferred to the newly formed British Records Association in March 1933.

The role of the RPS is to act as a rescue organisation and clearing-house for records deemed to be at risk, passing them on to appropriate institutional custodians. In practice, most of the records it has received have always come from the offices of London solicitors, and have been transferred to county record offices and other local archive repositories around the United Kingdom.

The work of the RPS was carried out largely by volunteers from its foundation until 1948, when a paid executive officer was appointed. From 1950 to 2009 the association was able to employ a qualified archivist (and at times other staff), principally to undertake Records Preservation work. This was made possible in part through the receipt of an annual grant-in-aid from HM Treasury, paid from 1959 to 2000; but the work is now again carried out on an entirely voluntary basis.

== Bibliography ==
- Baker, Penelope (2018). "Back-bone or burden?: the role of the RPS in the BRA". Archives. 53 (136): 27–44.
- Bond, M. F. (1962). "The British Records Association and the modern archive movement". In Hollaender, A. E. J. (ed.). Essays in Memory of Sir Hilary Jenkinson. London: Society of Archivists. pp. 71–90.
- Harris, Oliver D. (1989). "'The drudgery of stamping': a physical history of the Records Preservation Section". Archives. 19 (81): 3–17.
- Jenkinson, Hilary; Churchill, Irene (1948). 1932 to 1947: being a Report from the Joint Secretaries on their Retirement. London: British Records Association.
- Jubilee Essays: the British Records Association, 1932–1992. London: British Records Association. 1992.
- Shepherd, Elizabeth (2009). Archives and Archivists in 20th Century England. Farnham: Ashgate. pp. 131–6, 139–41. ISBN 9780754647850.
- Somerville, Robert (1957). "Ten years and a silver jubilee: report of the late Honorary Secretary, 1947–1957". Archives. 3 (18): 69–77.
