= Dorothy Owen =

English archivist and historian (1920–2002)

- Born: 11 April 1920; Hyde, Cheshire, England
- Died: 13 February 2002 (aged 81); Thimbleby, Lincolnshire, England
- Occupations: Archivist and historian

Dorothy Mary Owen, MBE, née Williamson (11 April 1920 – 13 February 2002) was an English archivist and historian.

== Life ==
Born in Hyde, Cheshire, England, and educated at Manchester University, Dorothy Williamson undertook postgraduate study there under C. R. Cheney, writing her dissertation on the legation of Cardinal Otto of Tonengo in the British Isles, 1237–1241.

From 1948 to 1958, she was assistant archivist at the Lincolnshire Archives. In 1958, she married Arthur Owen, a fellow archivist and historian, and moved to London to be archivist at Lambeth Palace Library. In 1960, the pair moved to Cambridge, where Arthur had been appointed to a job at Cambridge University Library.

Owen was soon instructing students in palaeography and diplomatic, and working on the diocesan records of Ely, recently deposited in the university library. She was formally appointed custodian of ecclesiastical archives in 1968 and keeper of the university archives in 1978. In 1969, she was elected a fellow of Wolfson College. She was active in the British Records Association, and served as chairman of its Records Preservation Section, 1966–71; chairman of council, 1974–78; and vice-president, 1981–91.

In 1987, she held the Sandars Readership in Bibliography at Cambridge.

In 1995, she was appointed MBE. She died in Thimbleby, Lincolnshire.

== Works ==
- The Records of the Established Church in England. Archives and the User. Vol. 1. London: British Records Association. 1970.
- Church and Society in Medieval Lincolnshire. History of Lincolnshire. Vol. 5. Lincoln: Lincolnshire Local History Society. 1971. ISBN 0-902668-04-8.
- The Library and Muniments of Ely Cathedral. Ely: Dean and Chapter of Ely, 1973.
- (ed.) John Lydford's Book. London: H.M.S.O. 1974. ISBN 0-11-440046-6.
- The Making of King's Lynn: a documentary survey. London: British Academy. 1984. ISBN 0-19-726027-6.
- The Medieval Canon Law: teaching, literature, and transmission. Cambridge: Cambridge University Press. 1988. ISBN 0-521-39313-2.
- (ed.) A History of Lincoln Minster. Cambridge: Cambridge University Press. 1994. ISBN 978-0-521-25429-8.
