= Priory Church of St Peter, Thurgarton =

The Priory Church of St Peter, Thurgarton
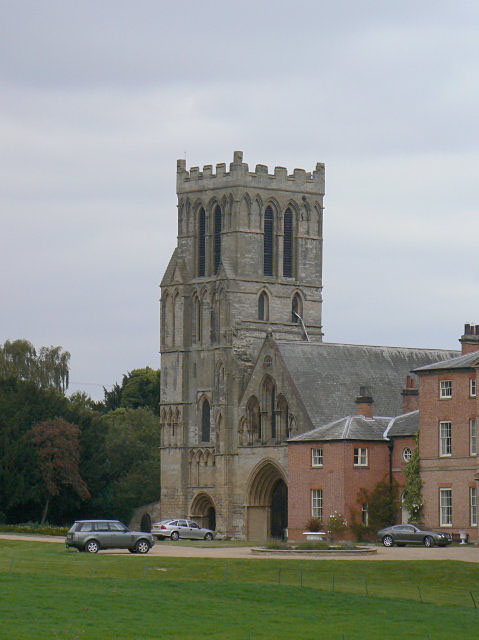
- The Priory Church of St Peter, Thurgarton
- 53°02′07″N 0°58′11″W
- OS grid reference: SK 69173 49192
- Country: England
- Denomination: Church of England
- Churchmanship: Broad Church

History
- Dedication: St Peter

Architecture
- Heritage designation: Grade I listed building
- Architectural type: Gothic
- Groundbreaking: 1119
- Completed: 1230

Administration
- District: Newark and Sherwood
- Province: York
- Archdiocese: York
- Diocese: Diocese of Southwell
- Archdeaconry: Newark
- Deanery: Southwell
- Parish: Thurgarton

Clergy
- Archbishop: Archbishop of York
- Bishop: The Right Reverend Paul Butler
- Dean: The Reverend Canon Tony Tucker

The Priory Church of St Peter, Thurgarton is a former house of Canons Regular or "Black Canons" and now a Church of England church in Thurgarton, Nottinghamshire, England. St Peter's is a Grade I listed building.

The Canons Regular were called "Black Canons" because they wore black cassocks, black capes and hoods.

== History ==
It is thought that a priory was built at Thurgarton for its location in circa 1119. It was in a sheltered valley and had a stream and natural spring very near. It also had a good supply of wood and stone for building.

At the Dissolution of the Monasteries the Valor Ecclesiasticus gave the clear income of £259 9s. 4d. (equivalent to £217,317 in 2025), making it one of richer monasteries of the time. King Henry VIII granted the manor partly to Trinity College, Cambridge, and partly to William Cooper. It was lived in by the Cooper family until at the end of the 17th century the estate passed to John Gilbert, who changed his name to Cooper, by a private act of Parliament, Gilbert's Name Act 1735 (9 Geo. 2. c. 27 Pr.), as a condition of William Cooper's will.

At the end of the 18th century, the owner demolished the old priory, so that nothing of it was left but the cellars, and one aisle of the old church, plus the tower, which make up the present church. The original building would have rivalled nearby Southwell Minster, having two western towers and a nave of seven bays, cloister and a large chancel, plus the monastic houses. The church was restored in 1853 by Thomas Chambers Hine. Parish registers exist from 1721; earlier records were lost in 1780.

The house called Thurgarton Priory was largely rebuilt for John Gilbert Cooper in 1777. It was used as the Bishop of Southwell's palace from 1884 to 1904 until a new one was built next to the cathedral in Southwell. Thurgarton Priory house is Grade II* listed.

=== List of the priors of Thurgarton ===
- Thomas, occurs c. 1190
- Henry, 1209; occurs 1218
- William, occurs 1234-1245
- Richard, occurs 1250-1257
- Adam, occurs 1263-1276
- Robert de Baseford, resigned 1284
- Gilbert de Ponteburg, 1284–1290
- Alexander de Gedling, 1290–1304
- John de Ruddeston, 1304–1319
- John de Hikeling, 1319–1331
- Robert de Hathern, 1331–1337
- John de Ruddeston, re-elected 1337-1338
- Richard de Thurgarton, 1338–1345
- Robert de Hickling, 1345–1349
- Robert de Claxton, 1349
- John de Calveton, died 1381
- William de Saperton, 1381
- Walter Hilton died 1396
- Robert de Wolveden, occurs 1432; resigned 1434
- Richard Haley, 1434
- William Bingham, 1471–1477
- Richard Thurgarton, died 1494
- John Allestre, 1494
- John Goverton, 1505
- John Angear, 1517–1534
- Thomas Dethick, 1534–1536
- John Berwick, 1536

== Parish status ==
It is in a joint parish with:

- St Mary's Church, Bleasby
- St James' Church, Halloughton
- St Michael's Church, Hoveringham

== See also ==
- List of English abbeys, priories and friaries serving as parish churches
- Grade I listed buildings in Nottinghamshire
- Listed buildings in Thurgarton
