= Aisthorpe =

Village in Lincolnshire, England

Coordinates: 53.310605°N 0.577015°W

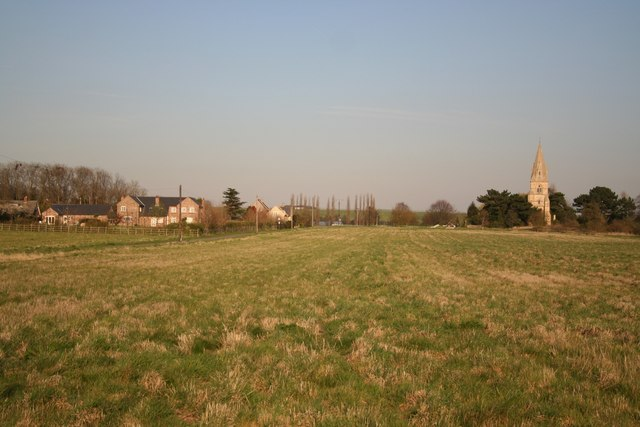
- Aisthorpe with St Peter's Church

- Location within Lincolnshire
- Population: 123 (2011)
- OS grid reference: SK949802
  - London: 125 mi (201 km) S
- Unitary authority: West Lindsey
- Ceremonial county: Lincolnshire
- Region: East Midlands
- Country: England
- Sovereign state: United Kingdom
- Post town: Lincoln
- Postcode district: LN1
- Police: Lincolnshire
- Fire: Lincolnshire
- Ambulance: East Midlands
- UK Parliament: Gainsborough

Aisthorpe is a small village and civil parish in the West Lindsey district of Lincolnshire, England. Aisthorpe is recorded as Æstorp in 1086, probably meaning "the secondary settlement to the east" from the Old English east and Old Danish thorp.

It is situated between Scampton and Brattleby on the B1398, a small back road to the west of, and parallel to, the A15 northern section of Ermine Street out of Lincoln.

Aisthorpe, or East Thorpe, is listed in the 1086 Domesday Book as consisting of 12 households.

The parish church is a Grade II listed building dedicated to Saint Peter and was built in 1867 by T. C. Hine of Nottingham.

Aisthorpe Hall is a Grade II listed country house dating from the 17th century, with later additions. The Hall also has an 18th-century Grade II listed stable block.

== Population ==
Year	Population
1801	71
1811	53
1821	70
1831	89
1841	82
1851	95
1881	112
1891	108
1901	104
1911	76
1921	66
1931	78
1941	N/A (World War II)
1951	89
1961	94
2001	96
2011	123
