= Bleasby, Nottinghamshire =

Village and civil parish in Nottinghamshire, England

Coordinates: 53.03988°N 0.93670°W

Bleasby
- Village and civil parish
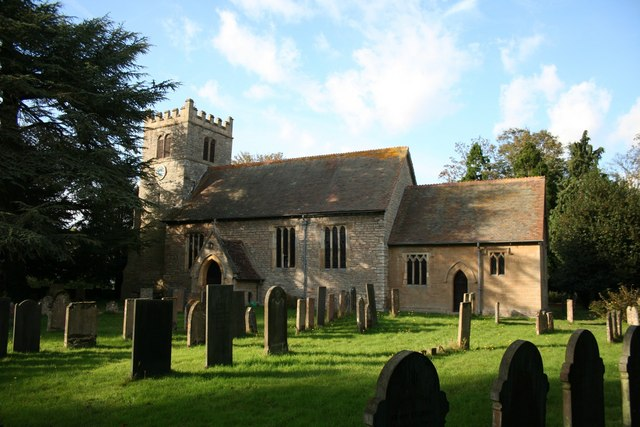
- St Mary's Church, Bleasby

- Location within Nottinghamshire
- Interactive map of Bleasby
- Area: 2.40 sq mi (6.2 km^{2})
- Population: 840 (2021)
  - Density: 350/sq mi (140/km^{2})
- OS grid reference: SK 7149
  - London: 110 mi (180 km) SSE
- District: Newark & Sherwood
- Shire county: Nottinghamshire
- Region: East Midlands
- Country: England
- Sovereign state: United Kingdom
- Post town: NOTTINGHAM
- Postcode district: NG14
- Dialling code: 01636
- Police: Nottinghamshire
- Fire: Nottinghamshire
- Ambulance: East Midlands
- UK Parliament: Newark
- Website: www.bleasbycommunity.uk

Bleasby is a village and civil parish in Nottinghamshire, England, located 15 mi northeast of Nottingham. It has a population of 804 for the 2001 census, increasing to 824 (and including Goverton) at the 2011 census, and 840 at the 2021 census.

== History ==
The village was served by a post office until early 2015, railway station and tea shop. The Saxon charter of 956 records Bleasby as Blisetune, named after a Danish soldier Blesi and tun the Anglo-Saxon word for settlement. Bleasby was the childhood home of William Booth, the founder of The Salvation Army.

== Hazelford Ferry ==
Before the building of the first Gunthorpe Bridge in 1875, it was an important crossing point over the River Trent at the Hazelford Ferry (grid reference SK725488). This was the main route to Lincoln and the coast at Grimsby avoiding expensive bridges at Newark and Nottingham. The ferry continued operating until well after the second world war as a recreational facility as it was adjacent to The Star & Garter public house. The public house has now been converted to a residential home for the elderly and the ferry has ceased operation (although the winding gear has been preserved on the North bank).

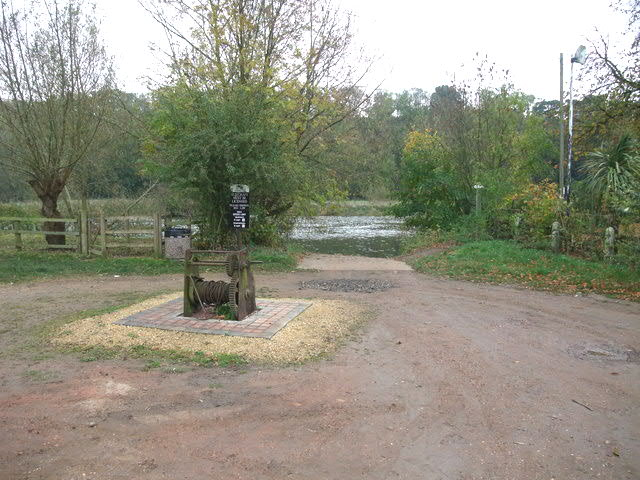
Winding Gear at Hazelford Ferry with boat-launch slipway in background, mostly used by the waterski club members, some having holiday homes to rear of the adjacent old (closed) pub

This location was thought to be the point where King Charles I crossed the Trent on his way to negotiate with the Scots at Southwell, prior to his eventual capture. It was the only part of the Trent close enough to Southwell that was fordable at the time and was far enough away from the Scots garrisoned at Kelham.

Perhaps more importantly it was the site of the baptism of the Saxon court of King Edwin in 627AD. King Edwin was king of all England with the exception of Kent and wished to marry Ethelburgh, the daughter of Ethelbert king of Kent. The problem being that Edwin was Pagan and Ethelbert being a Christian would only allow the marriage if Edwin would convert. Following the marriage on 625AD which for the first time unified the whole of England, the court of Edwin descended upon Bleasby, the Trent considered to be equidistant from Kent and Northumbria, and were all baptised in the shallow waters there by the Roman priest, Paulinus, who later became the first Archbishop of York.

== Amenities ==
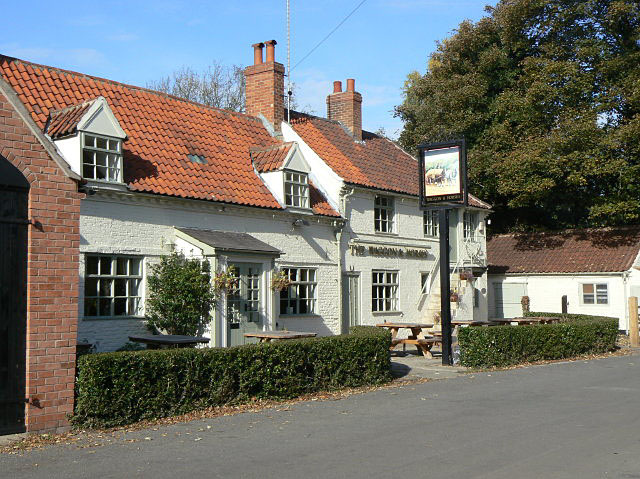
Waggon and Horses pub

Bleasby has a public house near St Mary's, the local parish church, a primary school, three caravan sites for holiday/weekend homes and a walking route around the Jubilee Ponds. The Trent Valley Way passes along the riverbank at this point.

The Trent Powerboat and Ski Club (TPSC) operate at Hazleford north bank, one of four areas nearby on the River Trent

== See also ==
- Listed buildings in Bleasby, Nottinghamshire
