= Steam Navigation Company =

Steam navigation companies became widespread during the 19th century after the development of steam-powered vessels, both steamboats, which were generally used on lakes and rivers, and ocean-faring steamships. Companies that share the name Steam Navigation Company include the following, listed by their country of ownership.

== Australia ==
- Australasian Steam Navigation Company (1839–1887)
- Australian United Steam Navigation Company (1887–1961), formed by the merger of the Australasian Steam Navigation Company and the Queensland Steam Shipping Company
- Clarence, Richmond & Macleay River Steam Navigation Company, 1888 name of the North Coast Steam Navigation Company
- Grafton Steam Navigation Company, 1855 name of the North Coast Steam Navigation Company
- Hunter River Steam Navigation Company, 1839 name of the Australasian Steam Navigation Company
- Illawarra Steam Navigation Company (1858–early 1950s), south coast of New South Wales
- Launceston & Melbourne Steam Navigation Company, taken over by the Tasmanian Steam Navigation Company in 1865
- North Coast Steam Navigation Company (1855–1954)
- River Murray Steam Navigation Company (charter received in 1854)
- Tasmanian Steam Navigation Company (1853–1922), between Tasmania, the Australian Mainland, and New Zealand

== India ==
- Bombay Coast and River Steam Navigation Company (c. 1860s), between Bombay and other Indian ports
- Bombay Steam Navigation Company (late 19th century–1952), passenger ferry and cargo services along the Konkan coast of India; amalgamated with Scindia Steam Navigation Company Ltd.
- Scindia Steam Navigation Company Ltd. (founded in 1919), ceased shipping in 1997
- Shri Ambica Steam Navigation Company (1942–before 1980), western coast of India
- Swadeshi Steam Navigation Company (founded in 1906), between Tuticorin and Colombo

== United Kingdom ==
- Atlantic Steam Navigation Company (1934–1971), roll-on roll-off ferry service
- Barrow Steam Navigation Company, acquired by the Midland Railway in 1907
- Bristol General Steam Navigation Company (1821–1980), between Bristol and ports in southern Ireland
- British India Steam Navigation Company (1862–1972), one of the largest shipowners of all time with; more than 500 ships; absorbed into P&O
- Calcutta and Burmah Steam Navigation Company (1856–1862), began as a mail carrier between Calcutta, India, and Rangoon, Burma; renamed British-India Steam Navigation Company
- Castletown Steam Navigation Company (1854–1858), between Isle of Man and England
- Eastern Steam Navigation Company (1851–c. 1858)
- General Steam Navigation Company (GSNC) (1824–1872), specialized in short sea shipping; acquired by P&O
- Indo-China Steam Navigation Company Ltd. (ICSNC) (1873–1974), established as a subsidiary of Hong Kong-based Jardine
- Neptune Steam Navigation Company, see SS Trondhjemsfjord
- North of Scotland, Orkney & Shetland Steam Navigation Company or The North Company (founded in 1875), part of NorthLink Ferries
- North Lancashire Steam Navigation Company (1843–1870), between Fleetwood and, principally, Belfast, Northern Ireland
- Orient Steam Navigation Company or Orient Line (1878–1966), absorbed into P&O
- Pacific Steam Navigation Company (1838– 1965), operated on the Pacific coast of South America
- Peninsular and Oriental Steam Navigation Company (P&O) (founded 1822), originally service between London, Spain and Portugal
- White Star Line or Oceanic Steam Navigation Company (1845–1934), merged with Cunard Line
- Scilly Isles Steam Navigation Company (1858–1872), between Cornwall and the Isles of Scilly
- Ullswater Steam Navigation Company (founded 1855), passenger transportation on Ullswater, English Lake District

== United States ==
- British and American Steam Navigation Company (1839–1841), London-New York service
- California Steam Navigation Company (1854–1871), transporta along the coast and inland waters of California, Oregon, and British Columbia
- Inter-Island Steam Navigation Company (1883–1947), passenger and cargo service between the Hawaiian Islands
- Ocean Steam Navigation Company (1847–1857), oceanic mail transportation for the U.S. government
- Oregon Steam Navigation Company (founded 1860), transport between San Francisco and ports along the Columbia River
- Colorado Steam Navigation Company (1867—1877), transport on the Colorado River, sold to the Southern Pacific Company
- Willamette Steam Navigation Company (1865–1866), transport on the Willamette River

== Other countries ==
- China Merchants' Steam Navigation Company (founded 1872)
- General Steam Navigation Company of Greece (1939–1975), passenger ship line
- Russian Steam Navigation and Trading Company (1856–1918)
