= SS Ellan Vannin =

Ellan Vannin was the name of a number of ships:

- SS Ellan Vannin (1854), a packet steamer built by John Laird, Birkenhead in 1854 for service with the Castletown Steam Navigation Company.
- SS Ellan Vannin (1860), originally constructed as an iron paddle steamer and named Mona's Isle. Name changed to Ellan Vannin following a re-build in 1883. Foundered between the Bar Light Ship and the Q1 Buoy in the River Mersey, December 3, 1909.

== See also ==
- Ellan Vannin
