= History of Bombay under British rule (1661–1947) =

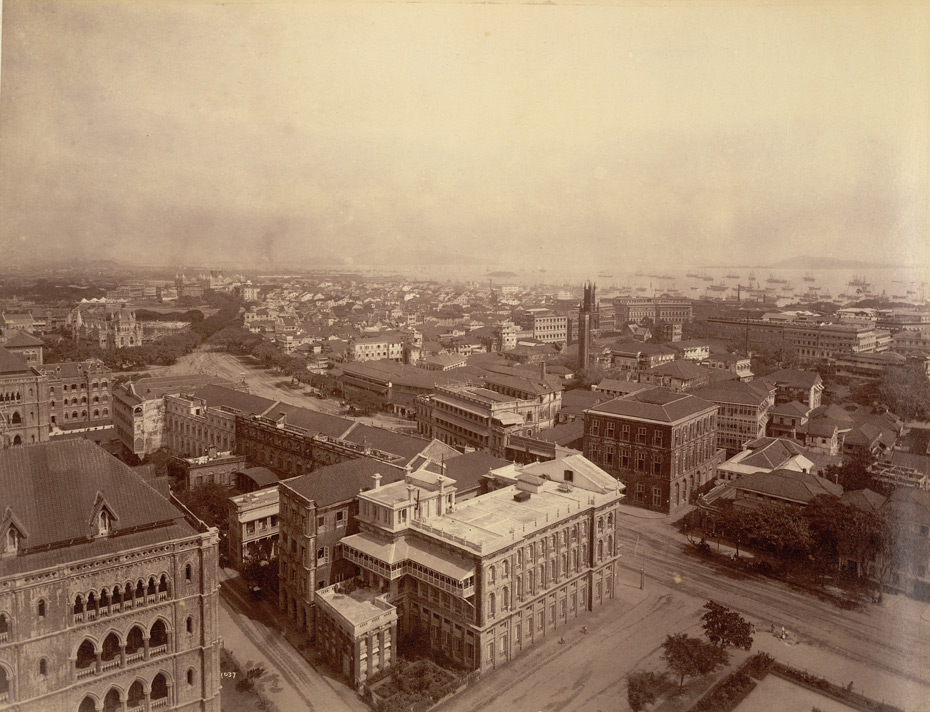
Bombay in the 1880s

Bombay, also called Bom baim in Portuguese, is the financial and commercial capital of India and one of the most populous cities in the world.

The city was once an archipelago of seven islands, obtained by the Portuguese via the Treaty of Bassein (1534), from the Sultan Bahadur Shah of Gujarat.

The island group would later form part of the dowry of Catherine of Braganza, daughter of King John IV of Portugal. Her 23 June 1661 Marriage Treaty gifted the islands to Charles II of England, along with the port of Tangier, trading privileges in Brazil and the Portuguese East Indies, religious and commercial freedom for English residents in Portugal, and two million Portuguese crowns (about £300,000), on completion of the marriage.

The Islands of Bombay were regarded as a political and financial liability and were leased by Charles, to the English East India Company, on 27 March 1668, for a nominal £10 rent.

== Establishment of the Company Settlement (1661–1817) ==
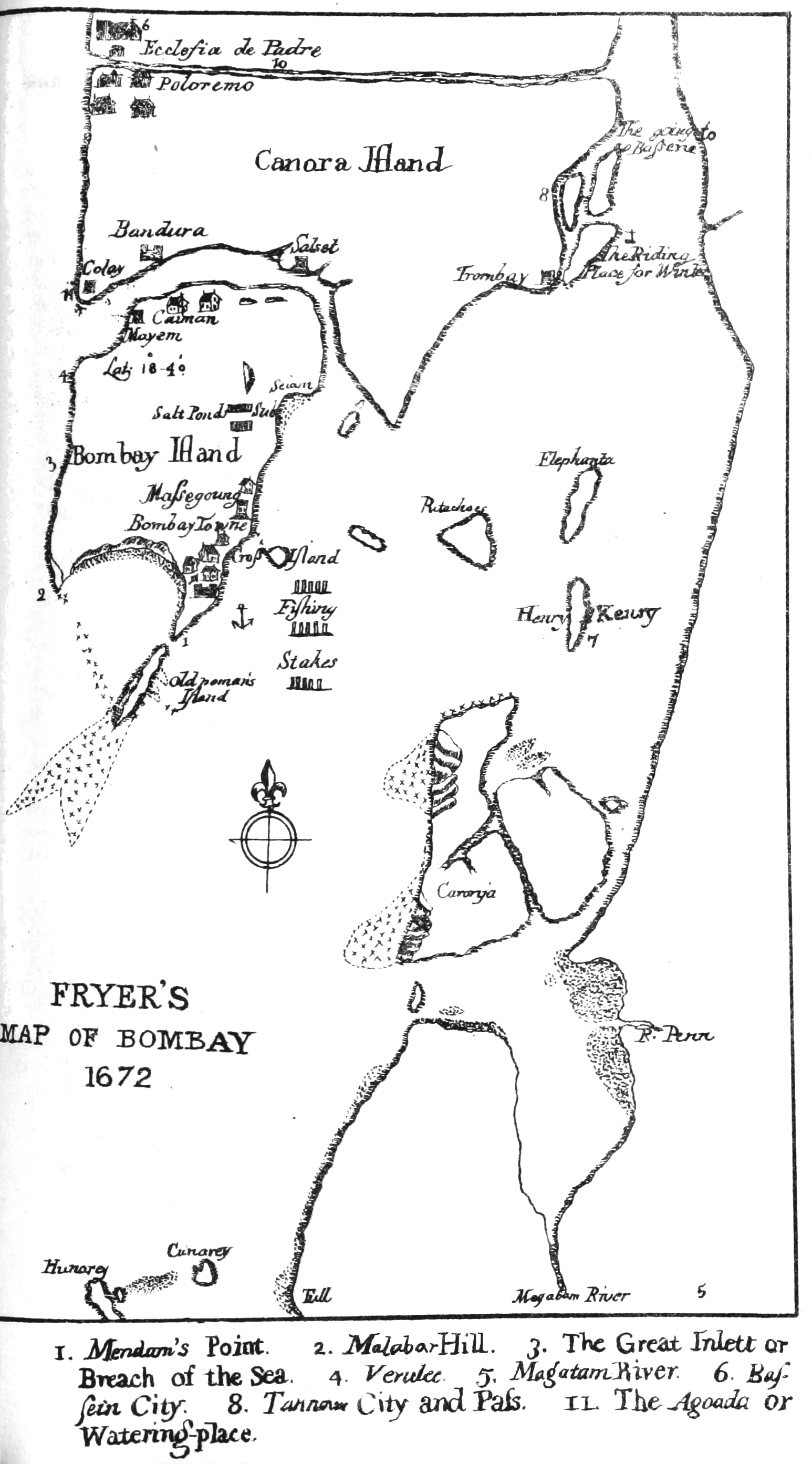
Bombay, 1672

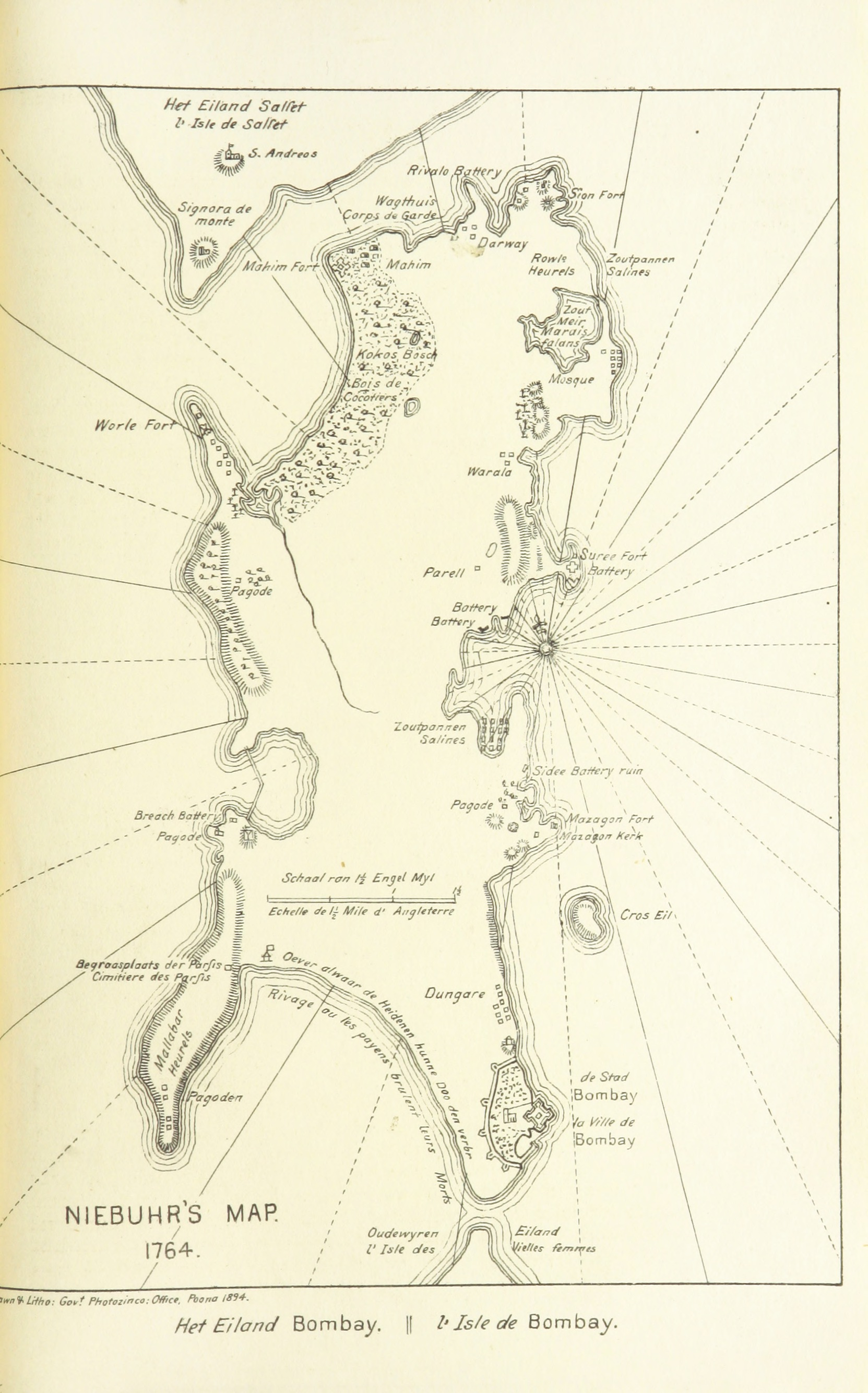
Bombay, Niebuhr's Map, 1764

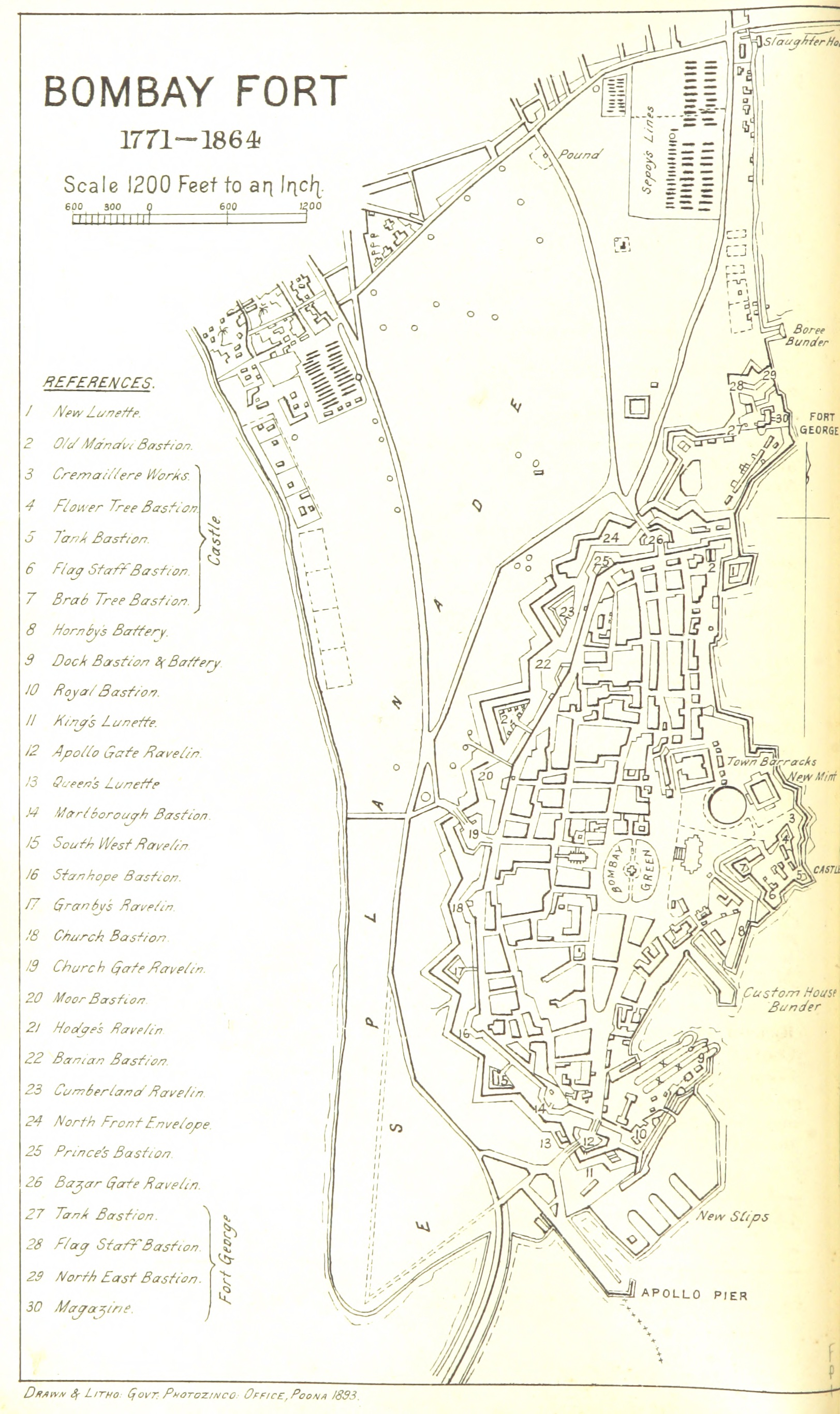
Bombay Fort, 1771–1864

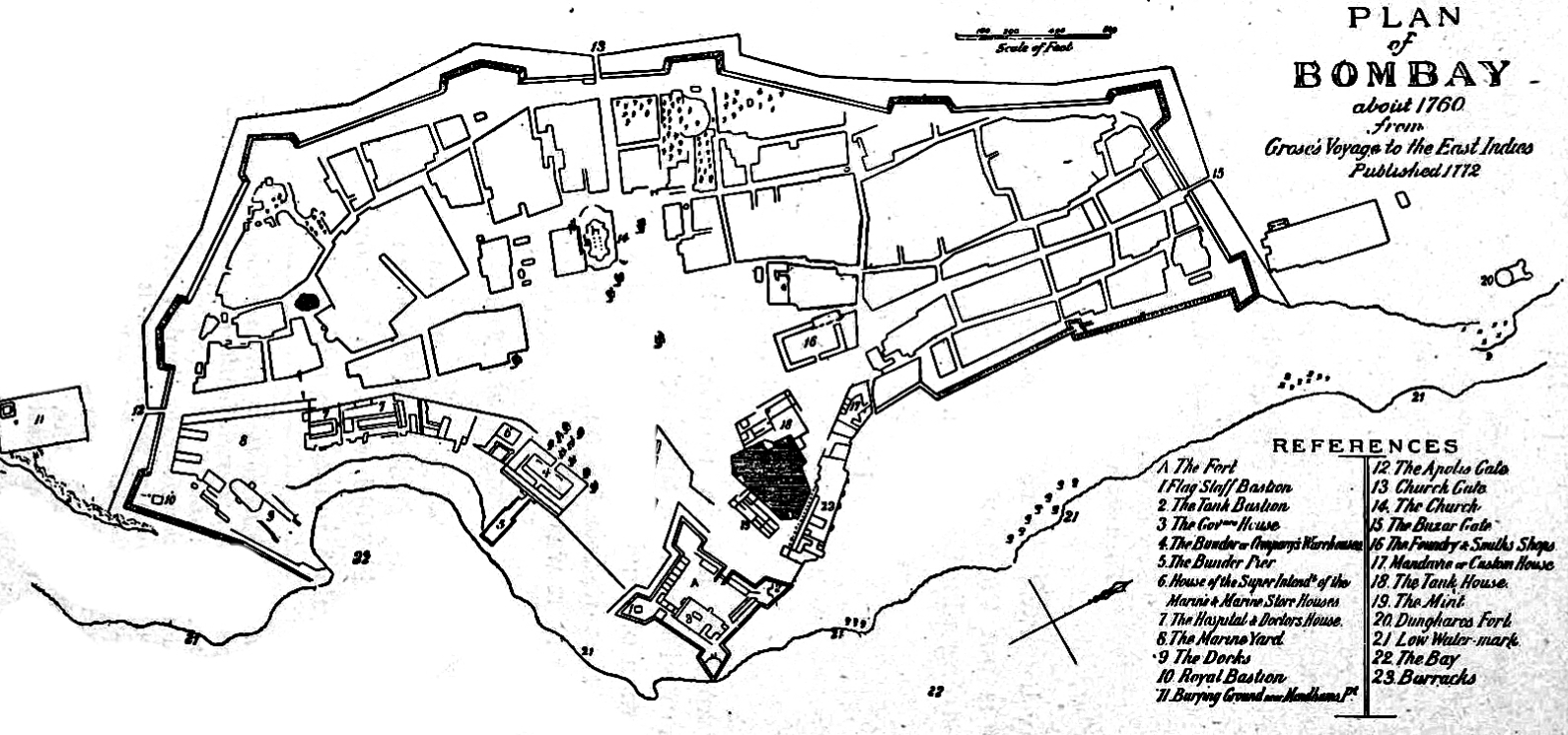
Plan of Bombay, 1760

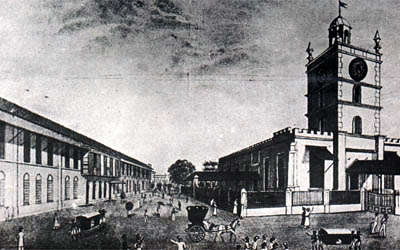
St. Thomas Cathedral, constructed by Charles Boone in 1718, was the first Anglican Church in Bombay.

=== 1660s ===
On 18 January 1665, King Charles II of England granted Humphrey Cooke the possession of Bombay. However, Salsette, Mazagaon, Parel, Worli, Sion, Dharavi, and Wadala still remained under Portuguese possession. Later, Cooke managed to acquire Mahim, Sion, Dharavi, and Wadala for the English. Sir Gervase Lucas, 1st Baronet, who was appointed Governor of Bombay on 5 November 1666, reported that Bombay included all the islands except Colaba and Old Woman's Island.

On 21 September 1668, the Royal Charter of 27 March 1668 led to the transfer of Bombay from Charles II to the English East India Company for an annual rent of £10. Sir George Oxenden became the first Governor of Bombay under the regime of the English East India Company. Gerald Aungier, who became Governor of Bombay in July 1669, established the mint and printing press in Bombay and developed the islands into a centre of commerce. He also offered various business incentives, which attracted various communities like Gujuratis, Parsis, Dawoodi Bohras, and Jews.

=== 1670s ===
On 20 February 1673, Rijckloff van Goens, the Governor-General of Dutch India attacked Bombay, but the attack was resisted by Aungier. The Treaty of Westminster (1674), concluded between England and Holland, relieved the English settlements in Bombay of further apprehension from the Dutch.

=== 1680s ===
In 1682, the Company fortified the Middle Ground Coastal Battery isle in the archipelago to curb the sea piracy in the area. Between 1678 and 1682, Yakut Khan, the Siddi admiral of the Mughal Empire, landed at Sewri and torched Mahim. By 15 February 1689, Khan conquered almost the whole island, and razed the Mazagon Fort in June 1690. After a payment made by the English to Aurangzeb, the ruler of the Mughal Empire, Yakut evacuated Bombay on 8 June 1690.

Sidi Qasim, or Yakut Khan, who acted as Mughal Empire empire navy officer, wintered the Bombay port as in practice the Mughals, and Maratha sailors are treating Bombay as their own. The Siddi sailors under Yakut Khan dominance in Bombay even prevented Sir John Child to seek retribution towards them when there is accident between Yakut Khan sailors with the english sailors in 1683.

=== 1710s ===
In 1715, the construction of Bombay Castle was finished, which fortified the island of Bombay from sea attacks by the Portuguese and Mughals. By 26 December 1715, Charles Boone assumed the Governorship of Bombay, and constructed the St. Thomas Cathedral in 1718, which was the first Anglican Church in Bombay.

=== 1730s ===
In 1737, Salsette was captured by the Maratha Empire and most of the Portuguese provinces in Bombay was ceded to the Marathas in 1739. In 1753, the Naval Dockyard was opened which remains the oldest docks in the city. The first land-use laws were also enacted in Bombay during this period. The British occupied Salsette in 1774, which was formally ceded to the British East India Company by the Treaty of Salbai signed in 1782.

=== 1780s ===
In 1782, William Hornby assumed the office of Governor of Bombay, and initiated the Hornby Vellard engineering project of connecting the isles in 1784. However, the project was rejected by the British East India Company in 1783. The construction of the Sion Causeway commenced in 1798 and was completed in 1803.

=== 1800s ===
In 1803, Bombay was hit by a severe famine, which led to a large-scale emigration. On 5 November 1817, the British East India Company defeated Bajirao II, the Peshwa of the Maratha Empire, in the Battle of Kirkee which took place on the Deccan Plateau. The success of the British campaign in the Deccan witnessed the freedom of Bombay from all attacks by native powers.

== City development (1817–1886) ==
Tanna railway viaducts
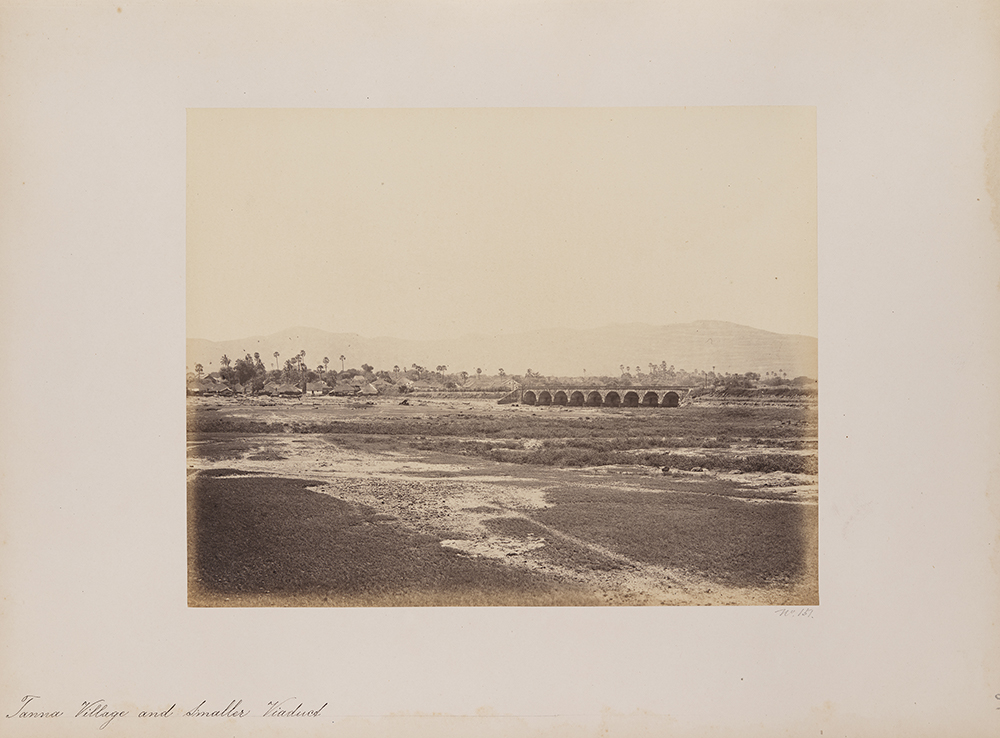
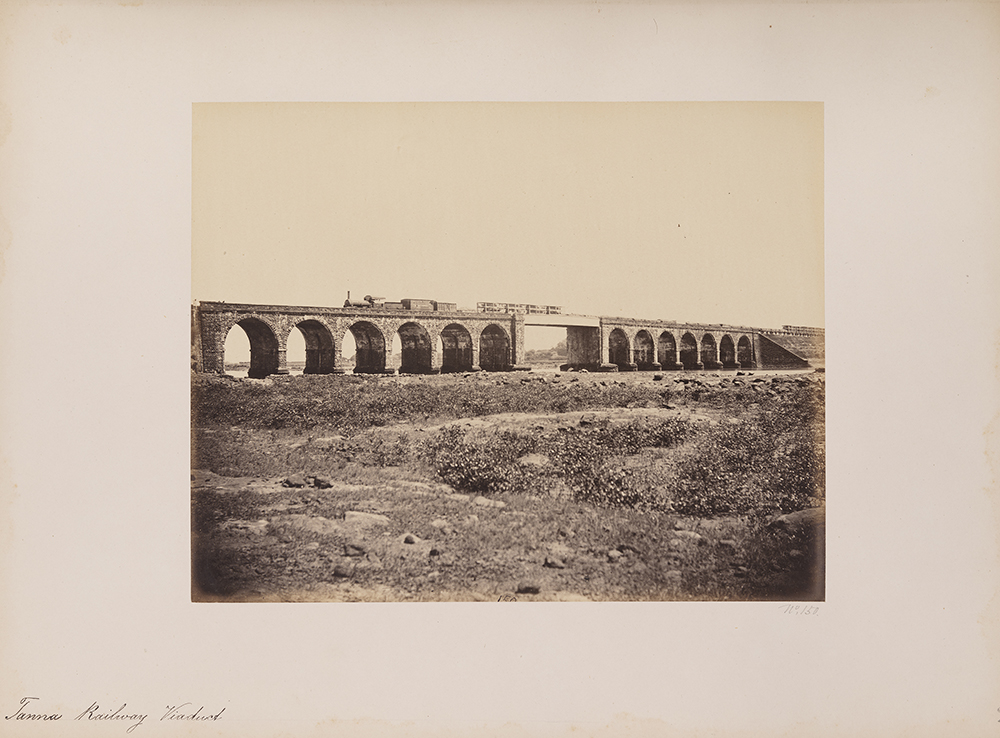
The smaller railway viaduct (top) and the longer railway viaduct (bottom) near Tanna (circa 1855)

=== 1810s ===
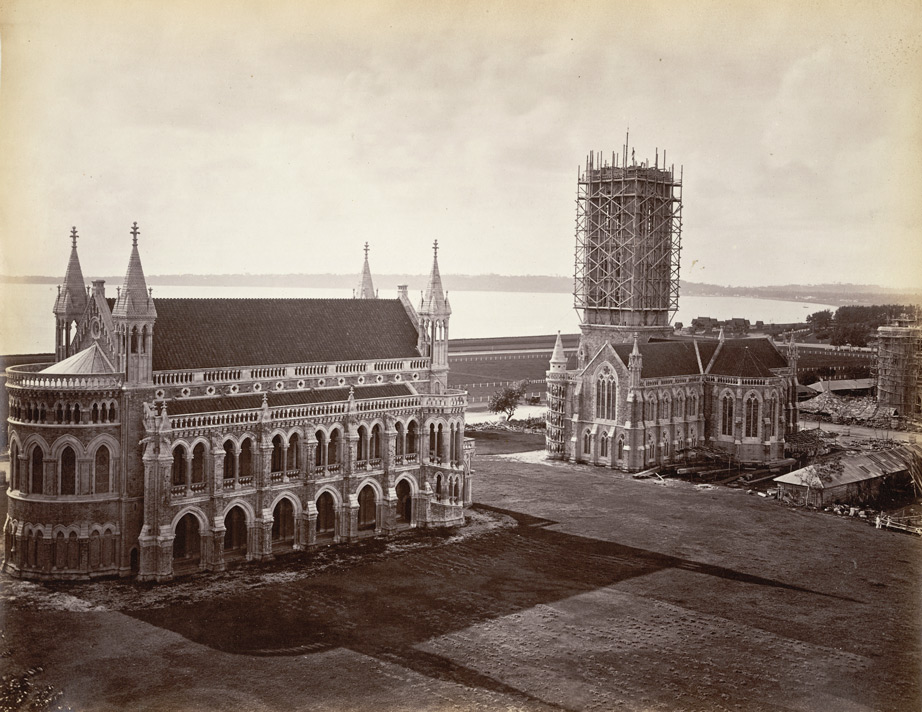
A file photo of University of Bombay's Campus (circa 1870)

The encouragement of the trade of Bombay with Jeshwanth combined with the company's military successes in the Deccan paved the way for the educational and economic progress which characterized the city during the nineteenth century. The Hornby Vellard project gained momentum in 1817. One of the chief improvements to the north of Colaba was the construction of the Wellington Pier (Apollo Bundar) the present Gateway of India area, which was opened for passenger traffic in 1819. Bombay was hit by a water famine in 1824.

=== 1830s ===
In July 1832, the Parsi-Hindu riots took place in consequence of a Government order for killing of dogs. In 1838, the islands of Colaba and Little Colaba were connected to Bombay by the Colaba Causeway.

=== 1840s ===
The Bank of Bombay was opened in 1840, which remains the oldest bank in the city. By 1845, all the seven islands had been connected to form a single island called Old Bombay having an area of 435 km^{2} (167.95 sq mi) by the Hornby Vellard project.

In 1845, the Mahim Causeway, which connected Mahim to Bandra was completed. In 1845, the Grant Medical College and hospital, the third in the country, was founded by Governor Robert Grant.

=== 1850s ===
Riots broke out between Muslims and Parsis in October 1851, in consequence of an ill-advised article on Muhammad which appeared in the Gujarathi newspaper. On 16 April 1853 the first-ever Indian railway line began operations between Bombay and neighbouring Tanna, over a distance of 21 miles.

The first cotton mill in Bombay, the Bombay Spinning and Weaving Company, was established on 7 July 1854. The foundation of the University of Bombay in 1857 made it the first modern institution of higher education in India, along with the University of Calcutta.

=== 1860s ===
The Great Indian Peninsular Railway and the Bombay, Baroda, and Central India Railway (BB&CI) were started in 1860. The outbreak of the American Civil War in 1861 increased the demand for cotton in the West, and led to an enormous increase in cotton-trade.

In 1866, the British Government established the Bombay Coast and River Steam Navigation Company for the maintenance of steam ferries between Bombay and nearby islands; while the opening of the Suez Canal in 1869 completely revolutionized the marine trade of Bombay.

=== 1870s ===
In 1870 the docks were consolidated under the Bombay Port Trust, and the Bombay Municipal Corporation was established in 1872, providing a modern framework of governance for the rapidly growing city. Tramway communication was also instituted in 1872. Public gardens such as the Victoria Gardens and Northbrook Gardens were opened in 1873 and 1874 respectively.

Violent Parsi-Muslim riots again broke out in February 1874, which were caused by an attack upon Muhammad published by a Parsi resident. The Bombay Gymkhana was formed in 1875 and soon organizations such as Bombay Quadrangular followed.

=== 1880s ===
Bombay became one of the few cities in the world to include a large national park within its limits, and the Bombay Natural History Society was founded in 1883. The Princess Dock was built in 1885 as part of a scheme for improving the whole foreshore of the Bombay harbour.

== Political consciousness and independence struggle (1885–1947) ==
First session of the Indian National Congress in Bombay (28–31 December 1885)

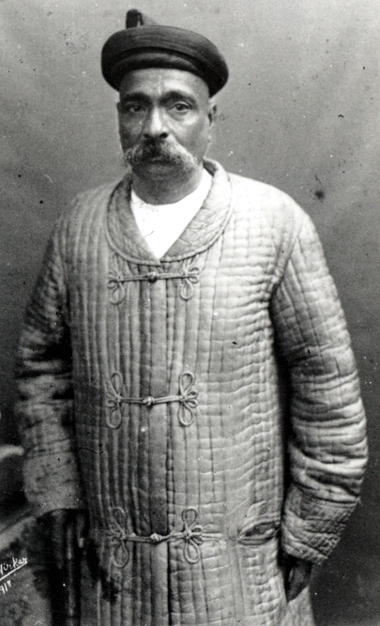
Bal Gangadhar Tilak was a popular leader of the Indian Independence Movement in Bombay.

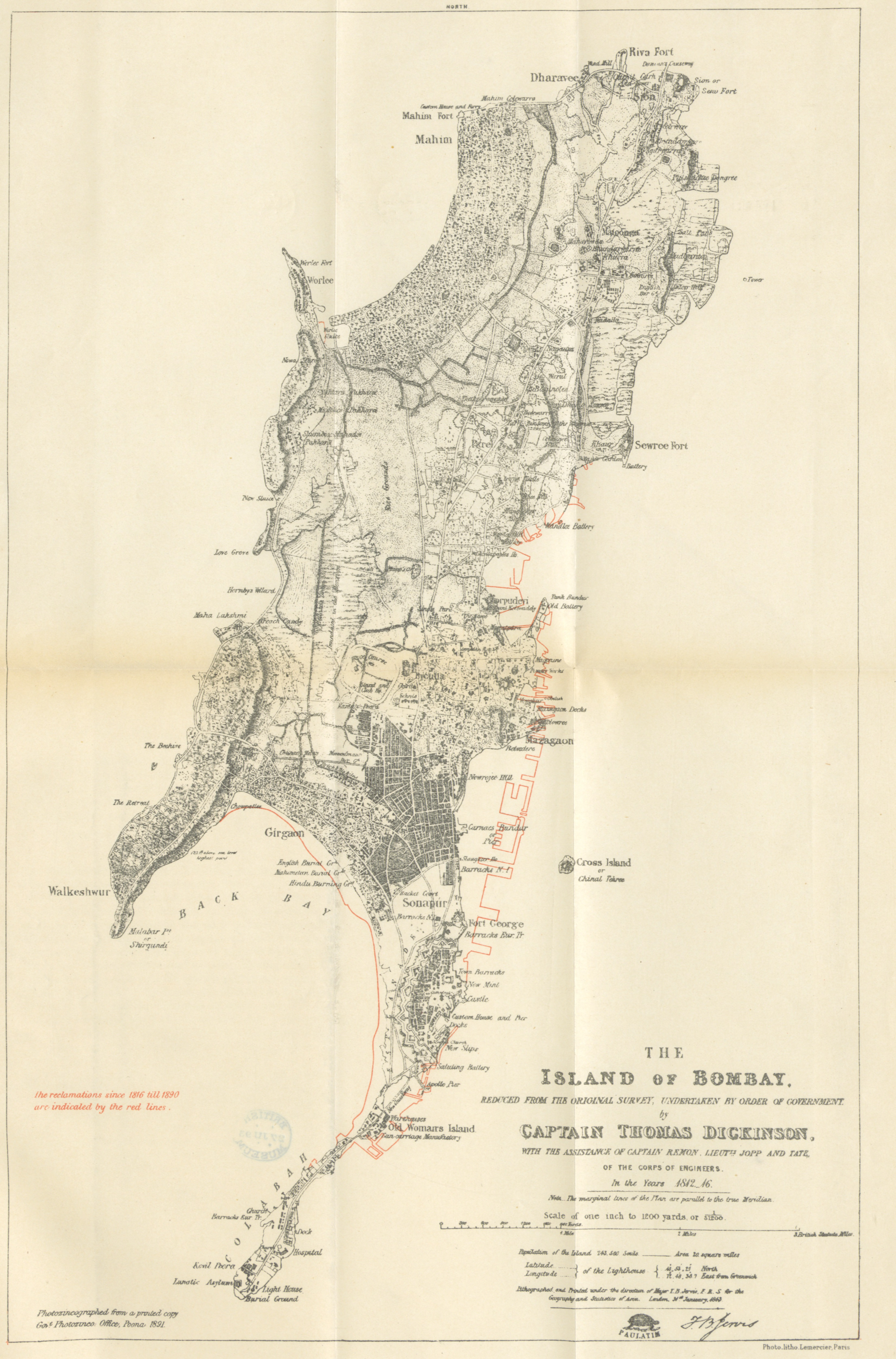
Map of Island of Bombay, 1812–16, re-published in 1893

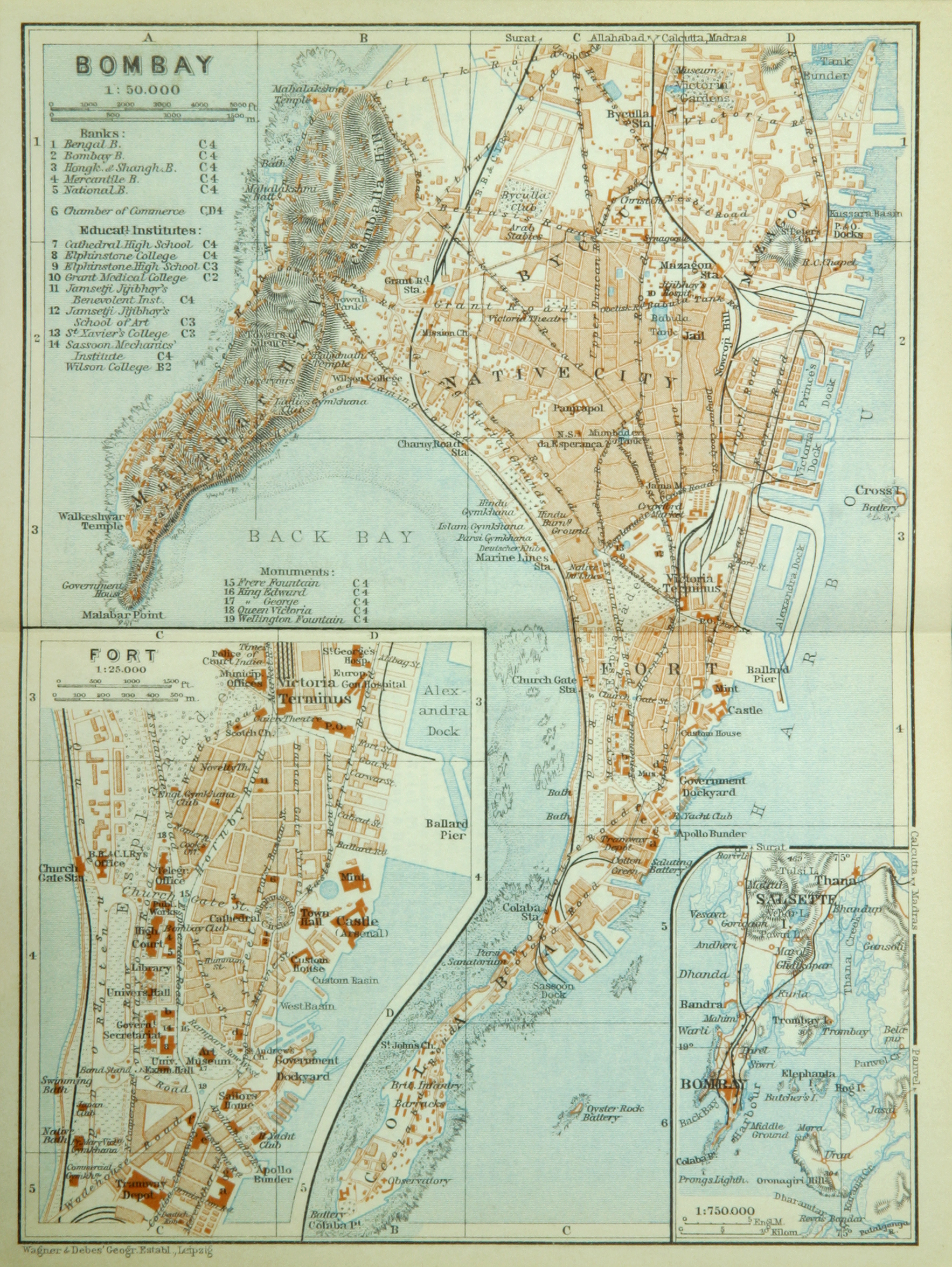
Map of Bombay, ca. 1914

=== 1885-88 ===
The growth of political consciousness started after the establishment of the Bombay Presidency Association by Dadabhai Naoroji on 31 January 1885. The Bombay Millowners' Association was formed in February 1875 in order to protect interests threatened by possible factory and tariff legislation by the British.

The foundation of the Indian National Congress in 1885 was one of the most important political event in Bombay. The first session of the Indian National Congress was held in Bombay from 28 to 31 December 1885. In 1888, the Bombay Municipal Act was enacted, which gave the British Government wide powers of interference in civic matters. The Victoria Terminus of the Great Indian Peninsular Railway, one of the finest stations in the world, was also completed in 1888.

=== 1890s ===
On 11 August 1893, a very serious riot took place between the Hindus and Muslims in Bombay, which led to 1500 arrests. 80 were injured.

In 1896, Bombay was hit by bubonic plague which killed thousands of citizens. In a single week in 1897, over 10,000 persons fled Bombay. On 9 March 1898 there was a serious riot which started with a sudden outbreak of hostility against the measures adopted by Government for suppression of plague. The riot led to a strike of dock and railway workers which paralysed the city for a few days. The significant results of the plague was the creation of the Bombay City Improvement Trust in 1898 and the Haffkine Institute in 1899.

=== 1900s ===
The cotton mill industry was also adversely affected during 1900 and 1901 due to the flight of workers because of the plague. The years 1904-05, however, witnessed a reversion of this state of affairs.

The Partition of Bengal in 1905 initiated the Swadeshi movement, which led to the boycotting of British goods, had a tremendous impact on Bombay. On 22 July 1908, Lokmanya Tilak, the principal advocate of the Swadeshi movement in Bombay, was sentenced to six years imprisonment, which led to huge scale protests in the city.

=== 1910s ===
The Bombay Chronicle was started by Pherozeshah Mehta, the leader of the Indian National Congress, in April 1913, which played an important role in the national movement till India's Independence. The most important event in Bombay early in 1915 was the visit of Mahatma Gandhi to Bombay.

The All India Home Rule League was inaugurated by Annie Besant at Madras in September 1916. Meanwhile, Tilak had already started his own Home Rule League at Bombay in May 1916 to bid for support of the mill workers in Bombay. Lord Willingdon convened the Provincial War Conference at Bombay on 10 June 1918, whose objective was to seek the co-operation of the people in the World War I measures which the British Government thought it necessary to take in the Bombay Presidency. The conference was followed by huge rallies across the city.

The worldwide influenza epidemic raged through Bombay from September to December 1918, causing hundreds of deaths per day. The first important strike in the textile industry in Bombay began in January 1919. Bombay was the main centre of the Rowlatt Satyagraha movement started by Mahatma Gandhi from February to April 1919. The movement was started as a result of the Rowlatt Act, which indefinitely extended emergency measures during the First World War in order to control public unrest.

=== 1920s ===
Following World War I, which saw large movement of Indian troops, supplies, arms and industrial goods to and from Bombay, the city life was shut down many times during the Non-cooperation movement from 1920 to 1922. In 1926, the Back Bay scandal occurred, when the Bombay Development Department under the British reclaimed the Back Bay area in Bombay after the financial crisis incidental to the post-war slump in the city.

In 1927, the first electric locomotives were put into service up to Poona and Igatpuri and later electric multiple rake commuter trains ran up to Virar on the Bombay, Baroda, and Central India Railway. In the late 1920s, many Persians migrated to Bombay from Yazd to escape the drought in Iran.

=== 1930s ===
In the early 1930s, the nationwide Civil disobedience movement against the British Salt tax spread to Bombay. Vile Parle was the headquarters of the movement in Bombay under Jamnalal Bajaj.

On 15 October 1932 industrialist and aviator J.R.D. Tata pioneered civil aviation in Bombay by flying a plane from Karachi to Bombay. Bombay was affected by the Great Depression of 1929, which saw a stagnation of mill industry and economy from 1933 to 1939. With World War II, the movement of thousands of troops, military and industrial goods and the fleet of the Royal Indian Navy made Bombay an important military base for the battles being fought in West Asia and South East Asia.

=== 1940s ===
The climactic Quit India rebellion was promulgated on 7 August 1942 by the Congress in a public meeting at Gowalia Tank. The Royal Indian Navy Mutiny of 18 February 1946 in Bombay marked the first and most serious revolt by the Indian sailors of the Royal Indian Navy against British rule. On 15 August 1947, finally India became independent. The last British troops to leave India, the First Battalion of the Somerset Light Infantry, passed through the arcade of the Gateway of India in Bombay on 28 February 1948.

The 282-year-long period of the British domination in Bombay ended after India's Independence in 1947.

== See also ==
- History of Mumbai
- History of Bombay under Portuguese rule

== References and Bibliography ==
- Aspengren, Henrik C. "Sociological knowledge and colonial power in Bombay around the First World War", "British Journal for the History of Science", Dec. 2011, Vol. 44 Issue 4, pp. 533–548.
- Collins, Charles Dillard (1988). Iconography and Ritual of Siva at Elephanta. State University of New York Press. ISBN 978-0-88706-774-7.
- David, M. D. (1973). History of Bombay, 1661–1708: 1661–1708. University of Bombay.
- Dobbin, Christine. Urban Leadership in Western India: Politics and Communities in Bombay City 1840-1885 (Oxford University Press), 1972.
- Dwivedi, Sharada; Rahul Mehrotra (2001). Bombay: The Cities Within. Eminence Designs.
- Khandekar, Vishnu Sakharam; A. K. Bhagwat; Acyuta Kesava Bhagavata (1977). Maharashtra, a Profile. V. S. Khandekar Amrit Mahotsava Satkar Samiti.
- Kidambi, Prashant. The Making of an Indian Metropolis. Colonial Governance and Public Culture in Bombay, 1890–1920 (Hampshire: Ashgate), 2007, pp. 268
- Kosambi, Meera. Bombay in Transition: The Growth & Social Ecology of a Colonial City, 1880–1980 (1986) 204pp
- Numark, Mitch. "Translating Dharma: Scottish Missionary-Orientalists and the Politics of Religious Understanding in Nineteenth-Century Bombay," Journal of Asian Studies, May 2011, 70#2, pp 471–500
- Sheppard, Samuel Townsend (1932). Bombay. The Times of India Press.
- Greater Bombay District Gazetteer. Maharashtra State Gazetteers. Vol. III. Government of Maharashtra. 1986.
- "Portuguese Settlements on the Western Coast". Maharashtra State Gazetteer (PDF). Government of Maharashtra. 1977.
- Thana District Gazetteer. Gazetteers of the Bombay Presidency. Vol. XIII. Government of Maharashtra. 1986 [1882].
- Thana — Places of Interest. Gazetteers of the Bombay Presidency. Vol. XIV. Government of Maharashtra. 2000 [1882].
