= Ellan Vannin =

Ellan Vannin may refer to:

- the Manx name for the Isle of Man
- "Ellan Vannin" (poem), a poem and song, known as the alternative Isle of Man national anthem
- SS Ellan Vannin (1854), an iron-built packet steamer operated out of Castletown, Isle of Man
- SS Ellan Vannin (1883), an iron paddle steamer that foundered in 1909 with loss of 36 people
- "The Ellan Vannin Tragedy", a song by British folk group The Spinners
- Ellan Vannin football team
