= Bombay Development Department =

1920 housing department in India

- Formation: 1920
- Founder: Sir George Lloyd
- Type: Government department
- Purpose: To implement housing and development schemes in Bombay City, including the Back Bay Reclamation Scheme and the construction of 50,000 tenements
- Headquarters: Bombay

The Bombay Development Department (BDD) was established in 1920 by the Bombay Presidency with the primary objective of providing more land for housing and constructing 50,000 tenements on reclaimed lands. The Bombay Development Department (BDD) chawls were constructed by the British government between 1920 and 1925. It was established by Sir George Lloyd, the Governor of Bombay.

== Projects ==
The Bombay Development Department has been responsible for several notable projects, including BBD Chawls, the Back Bay Reclamation project and the development of Salsette Island, which helped provide adequate water to the city of Bombay. BDD undertook the reclamation of Marine Drive located along the southern coast of Bombay Island and initiated the development of suburbs to the north. BDD undertook massive housing schemes in the city, which are now known as BDD chawls.

== BDD Chawls ==
The Bombay Development Department (BDD) constructed affordable housing for the large number of workers employed in the mills, ports, and railway construction. It consisted of single-room tenements spanning 160 sq. ft.

As of August 2021, there are a total of 195 BDD Chawls located at Worli, Naigaon, and N M Joshi Road in Parel area of Mumbai, covering an area of 86.98 acres, with the Worli BDD chawls occupying the largest area of 59.69 acres and housing close to 12,000 families. Out of the 195 BDD chawls, 121 are located in Worli.

=== Redevelopment ===
The BDD chawls, which are over a century old, have been in a state of disrepair for a long time and are a safety concern, making redevelopment a longstanding demand. In 2017, the BJP-Shiv Sena government led by Devendra Fadnavis launched a Rs 17,000 crore redevelopment plan. The plan includes rehousing the residents of more than 16,000 apartments in the new buildings for free. But the project could not begin due to issues like eligibility criteria, selection of contractors and agreement issues. In August 2020, the BDD Chawls redevelopment plan was revived by CM Uddhav Thackeray and Sharad Pawar. The Balasahebanchi Shiv Sena led Eknath Shinde government has set a target to complete the redevelopment of the BDD chawls before the 2024 elections.

In January 2023, the Chief Minister Eknath Shinde approved the allotment of 300 sqft housing units to eligible residents of the BDD chawls in Worli, Naigaon, and NM Joshi Marg (Parel) after the redevelopment process. The new housing units are larger than the previous ones, the largest of which were 269 sqft. The Maharashtra Housing and Area Development Authority (MHADA) has been assigned for the redevelopment.

== See also ==
- Bombay City Improvement Trust
- History of Bombay under British rule (1661–1947)
- History of Mumbai
