= Castletown Steam Navigation Company =

Defunct maritime transportation company

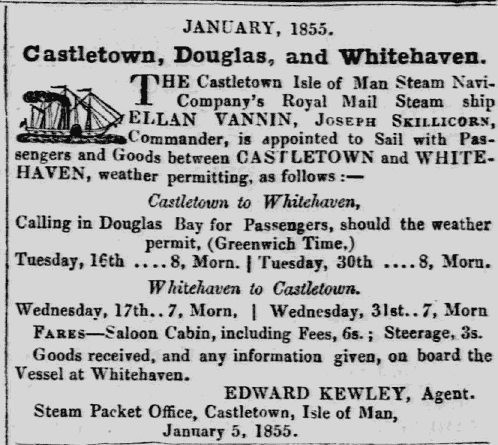
- Advertisement for the services of the Ellan Vannin
- Company type: Privately held company
- Industry: Maritime Transportation
- Founded: 1854
- Headquarters: Castletown, Isle of Man
- Key people: John McMeiken. Captain Joseph Skillicorn.

The Castletown Steam Navigation Company or Castletown (Isle of Man) Steam Navigation Company - also referred to as the Castletown Steam Packet Company - was a privately owned maritime transportation company incorporated in the Isle of Man. Its registered office was in Castletown, Isle of Man. By 1858 the company had run into significant financial difficulties which ultimately led to the sale of its vessel, the Ellan Vannin, and the winding up of the company.

== Company operations ==
Commencing operations in August 1854 the company was formed to provide maritime transportation of cargo and passengers from the Isle of Man primarily to Whitehaven, Cumberland and the Port of Liverpool with the operation undertaken by its newly built vessel the Ellan Vannin.

For the town of Castletown the beginning of the company's operation was described as a joyous occasion. Shops in the town were closed, numerous flags were flown and ships in the harbour were adorned with bunting. One flag at the company’s offices displayed the ancient armorial symbol of the Isle of Man, with the motto "We are Progressing" and on the reverse side "Success to our Steamer".

The Ellan Vannin entered service under the command of Captain Joseph Skillicorn, an experienced mariner who prior to his appointment had been in the employ of the Isle of Man Steam Packet Company serving on the Mona's Queen with the rank of First Officer. In order to maximise revenue the Castletown Steam Navigation Company would also serve Douglas. In March 1856 the company commenced a service from Douglas via Castletown to Kingstown, and also served Holyhead from Castletown.

In the summer of 1856 excursions were also organised from Castletown via Peel to Strangford Lough so as people could attend the Ardglass Regatta.

At a meeting held at the Union Hotel, Castletown, on Monday 11 August 1856, a gift in the form of a gold chronometer was presented to Capt. Skillicorn in recognition of his efficient management of the Ellan Vannin and for his part in the establishment of the company.

However, by the end of 1856 the Castletown Isle of Man Steam Navigation Company were starting to make a loss. At their third Annual General Meeting held at the town hall, Castletown on Wednesday 17 December 1856, it was disclosed that for the previous two months the company had sustained a weekly loss of £12 (equivalent to £1,117 in 2025) resulting in a total loss of £100 (equivalent to £9,311 in 2025). One of the directors reported that they had received several offers from a company in Dublin to charter the Ellan Vannin for the winter months of 1856-57. The rate for the charter was to be £50 per week (equivalent to £4,656 in 2025) with a further payment of £28 per week (equivalent to £1,676 in 2025) towards the wages of the crew. The charterer was to be also responsible for the costs of coal, oil and port charges. As terms of this potential charter, the directors had undertaken measures to enable the direct link between Castletown and Liverpool to be maintained. An agreement had been reached with the Ramsey Steam Company who would employ their vessel the Manx Fairy on the route. This was seen as a sensible course of action as opposed to sustaining a weekly loss of £12 over the winter months. It can be assumed that the offer of the winter charter was accepted as there is no published schedule in the Manx Press for the Ellan Vannin from 10 December 1856 until mid-May 1857.

The question was also raised at the meeting as to whether the Board had received an offer for the sale of the Ellan Vannin. One shareholder understood that the company had been offered £14,000 (equivalent to £1,303,578 in 2025) for the vessel. This was explained by a director who stated that "should" they be interested in the vessel's sale, then the former proprietor of the Countess of Ellesmere "could" be willing to pay that sum. However, there is no evidence of any offer having been made and no proposal for any sale is recorded as having been presented to the shareholders by the Board of Directors.

In the summer of 1857 the Ellan Vannin's regular sailings were augmented by summer cruises from Douglas via Castletown and on to the Calf of Mann. Also further pleasure cruises were added via Peel and onwards to the north of Ireland. It would appear that the vessel was being utilised to her maximum. Sailings to Whitehaven and Liverpool were maintained whilst sailings to Glasgow and from Liverpool to Dundrum via the Isle of Man were introduced.

However it would seem that the company continued to sustain losses over the winter of 1857-58, and by March 1858 it had been decided to put the Ellan Vannin up for sale by public auction. She was sailed to Trafalgar Dock, Liverpool on 6 March, where she was laid up awaiting sale. She was offered for sale at the Broker's saleroom, 5, York Buildings, Dale Street, Liverpool on 18 March 1858. Either no sale could be agreed or no interest was expressed, and the Ellan Vannin resumed trading whilst a further public auction was scheduled for 20 May. She was advertised for sale with inspections being offered at Liverpool or Castletown. The sale commenced at the Quay, Castletown, at 12:00hrs on Thursday 20 May 1858, and it was reported that there was a good attendance. The bidding proceeded very slowly with the highest offer being £4,200 (equivalent to £451,238 in 2025) (a long way short of the £14,000 reputed to have been available in 1856) a sum which the directors and shareholders present would not accept. Again the Ellan Vannin resumed revenue service whilst further attempts were made to find a buyer. The Ellan Vannin's final excursion took her across to the coast lines of County Louth and County Down via Carlingford Lough on 25 June, before she left the Isle of Man for good.

Finally the Directors of the Castletown Steam Navigation Company (by now in serious financial difficulties) managed to find a buyer. Ellan Vannin was sold to Cunard & Wilson who were acting as agents for the Sardinian Government for £4,070 (equivalent to £437,272 in 2025). Upon purchase Ellan Vannin's name was changed to Archimedes.

The company's offices in Castletown, Isle of Man were closed, with a sale of the fixtures and fittings to the public held on Wednesday 11 August 1858. Attendance was said to be good, with people wanting to buy mementoes of the Ellan Vannin.

The Castletown Steam Navigation Company subsequently went into liquidation. A further call on the shareholders of 10 shillings per share was made in order to finally clear the liabilities incurred by the Ellan Vannin for final claims of £600 (equivalent to £64,463 in 2025). The company was finally dissolved in 1860.
