= SS Ellan Vannin (1854) =

British steamship

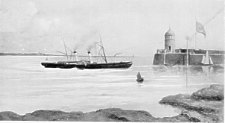
- Ellan Vannin entering Castletown Harbour, Isle of Man.

History
- Name: Ellan Vannin
- Namesake: Gaelic term of the Isle of Man
- Owner: Castletown Steam Navigation Company (also referred to as the Castletown Steam Packet Company)
- Operator: Castletown Steam Navigation Company
- Port of registry: Castletown, Isle of Man
- Route: Castletown - Liverpool / Whitehaven / Kingstown / Holyhead / Dundrum
- Builder: John Laird & Co., Birkenhead
- Yard number: 119
- Laid down: March 1854
- Launched: 24 June 1854
- Completed: July 1854
- Acquired: August 1854
- Maiden voyage: 1 August 1854
- In service: August 1854
- Out of service: June 1858
- Fate: Sold to Cunard & Wilson who were acting as agents for the Sardinian Government. Name changed to Archimedes.

General characteristics Ellan Vannin
- Type: Packet Steamer
- Tonnage: 350 gross register tons (GRT)
- Length: 170 ft (51.8 m)
- Beam: 39 ft (11.9 m)
- Draught: 5 ft 6 in (1.7 m) (light) 7 ft 6 in (2.3 m) (full load)
- Depth: 9 ft 6 in (2.9 m)
- Installed power: 100 shp (75 kW)
- Propulsion: Twin Fawcett & Preston Marine Oscillating Engines, delivering 100 horse power (nominal) driving twin Paddle Wheels of 16 ft (4.9 m) diameter.
- Speed: Approximately 12 knots
- Capacity: 286 passengers 100 tons of cargo

SS (RMS) Ellan Vannin was an iron-built packet steamer which was operated out of Castletown, Isle of Man for the Castletown Steam Navigation Company (also referred to as the Castletown Steam Packet Company) to Liverpool and Whitehaven. Her name, Ellan Vannin, came from the Gaelic term by which the Isle of Man is known.

== Construction & dimensions ==
Ellan Vannin was built by John Laird and Co. Ltd, Wallasey Pool, Birkenhead and was launched by Mrs. H. Houldsworth at 13:00hrs on Saturday 24 June 1854. Length 170'; beam 21' (exclusive of the paddle boxes) 39' overall. Ellan Vannin was powered by two oscillating marine engines with tubular boilers, built by Messrs. Fawcett, Preston & Co. (similar to those installed in the Countess of Ellesmere) which developed 100 shp (75 kW), driving two paddle wheels of 16' diameter which were fitted with feathered floats. The paddle floats were "feathered" so as to help to reduce vibration which could be common in early marine steam engines. She was divided into five water tight compartments had accommodation for 100 tons of cargo and a bunker capacity for 40 tons of coal.

Ellan Vannin was regarded to be a remarkable vessel, having a smart rakish appearance, her general exterior being similar to the Countess of Ellesmere. She was built after the model of that vessel, but with the additional requirements to adapt her for sea-going purposes in the challenging conditions around the Isle of Man.

Clinker built, Ellan Vannin was rigged as a two mast steamer with two white painted funnels and with a full-length female figurehead sitting on a rock adorned with a castellated crown.

Ellan Vannin was well appointed for the carriage of passengers with accommodation for 91 First Class and 195 Second Class. Her after saloon was 29 ft (8.8 m) in length and 7 ft (2.1 m) high. The walls were panelled and decorated with sketches of Castletown and Birkenhead. The ends of the saloon were finished with fretwork panels in oak and in the ceiling two handsome sky lights constructed of East India Teak allowed ample light to be directed inwards. Off the main saloon was the ladies' cabin which also enjoyed a similar level of comfort to the main saloon. The Captain's room, stewards pantry and the washrooms were situated at the foot of the main staircase.

There was a forward saloon for the use of second class passengers, and around the deck were situated seats which could be removed in order to accommodate general cargo or livestock. A Tyzak and Dobson patent windlass was installed on the deck so as to aid the loading and unloading of cargo.

Ellan Vannin underwent her sea trials on Saturday 29 July 1854, prior to which she was involved in a race against the Countess of Ellesmere (said by contemporary reports to be the fastest steamer on smooth water in the whole of England). Several representatives of her owners were present accompanied by a band, and were taken to the Ellan Vannin, which was lying mid-stream by the steam tug Sampson.

Once aboard the party witnessed the launch of the steamer Ethiope, the Ellan Vannin then steamed up the river as far as the Ince Lighthouse to meet the Countess of Ellesmere. The Countess operating under the command of Captain Street, was brought up alongside the Ellan Vannin, at that point full steam was given and both vessels raced away towards Garston. For a short time the Countess gained on the Ellan Vannin but soon both vessels came exactly abreast of each other. The race took twelve minutes to cover the 5 nautical miles to Garston, the result being a dead heat.

Subsequently, the Ellan Vannin sailed down the channel as far as the Bell Buoy and back, during the course of which her speed was gauged by Captain Ponsonby on board the Mobile. A two knot tide was running against her, however the Ellan Vannin covered the distance from the Northwest Lightship to the Rock Lighthouse in 1 hour 12 minutes. Luncheon was then served, the directors being joined by John Laird who had been on deck observing the trial.

The Ellan Vannin made her maiden voyage from Liverpool to Castletown on Tuesday 1 August, with several directors of the Castletown Steam Navigation Company being onboard after accepting the vessel from John Laird & Co. For the town of Castletown it was described as a joyous occasion. Shops in the town were closed, numerous flags were flown and ships in the harbour were adorned with bunting. One flag at the company's offices displayed the ancient armorial symbol of the Isle of Man, with the motto "We are Progressing" and on the reverse side "Success to our Steamer".

To signal the Ellan Vannin’s arrival small cannon were placed at different points – one at the stack of Scarlett, another at the old pier-head and a third on the quay. Work had also been undertaken by the Commissioners of Harbours in order to deepen the harbour so as to accommodate the new vessel.

The Ellan Vannin departed Liverpool at 08:00hrs and made good time during the passage. Just after 14:00hrs she rounded Langness Point and entered Castletown Bay, amidst the booming of the cannon and the cheering of the crowd, arriving off the pier at 14:20hrs having made passage in 6 hours 20 minutes.

After landing her passengers and the directors who had been on board, the Ellan Vannin proceeded across to the new pier where she was opened to the general public. The Ben-my-Chree, which was returning to Douglas following a pleasure cruise around the Island passed close by and greeted the Ellan Vannin by firing two guns.

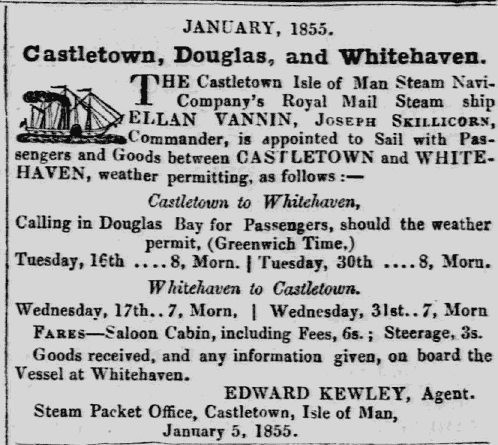
Advertisement for the services of the Ellan Vannin.

== Service life ==
The Ellan Vannin entered service under the command of Captain Joseph Skillicorn, an experienced mariner who prior to his appointment had been in the employ of the Isle of Man Steam Packet Company serving on the Mona's Queen with the rank of First Officer. Mainly the Ellan Vannin would ply between Castletown, Isle of Man and Whitehaven, Cumberland and also between Castletown and Liverpool. During passage in order to maximise revenue she would invariably call at Douglas en route. In March 1856 she commenced a service from Douglas via Castletown to Kingstown, and also served Holyhead from Castletown.

Ellan Vannin also operated an excursion from Castletown via Peel to Strangford Lough in the summer of 1856 so as her passengers could attend the Ardglass Regatta.

At a meeting held at the Union Hotel, Castletown, on Monday 11 August 1856, a gift in the form of a gold chronometer was presented to Capt. Skillicorn in recognition of his efficient management of the Ellan Vannin and for his part in the establishment of the company.

However, by the end of 1856 the Castletown Steam Navigation Company were starting to make a loss. At their third Annual General Meeting held at the town hall, Castletown on Wednesday 17 December 1856, it was disclosed that for the previous two months the company had sustained a weekly loss of £12 (equivalent to £1,117 in 2025) resulting in a total loss of £100 (equivalent to £9,311 in 2025). One of the directors reported that they had received several offers from a company in Dublin to charter the Ellan Vannin for the winter months of 1856–57. The rate for the charter was to be £50 per week (equivalent to £4,656 in 2025) with a further payment of £28 per week (equivalent to £1,676 in 2025) towards the wages of the crew. The charterer was to be also responsible for the costs of coal, oil and port charges. As terms of this potential charter, the directors had undertaken measures to enable the direct link between Castletown and Liverpool to be maintained. An agreement had been reached with the Ramsey Steam Company who would employ their vessel the Manx Fairy on the route. This was seen as a sensible course of action as opposed to sustaining a weekly loss of £12 over the winter months. It can be assumed that the offer of the winter charter was accepted as there is no published schedule in the Manx Press for the Ellan Vannin from 10 December 1856 until mid-May 1857.

The question was also raised at the meeting as to whether the Board had received an offer for the sale of the Ellan Vannin. One shareholder understood that the company had been offered £14,000 (equivalent to £1,303,578 in 2025) for the vessel. This was explained by a director who stated that "should" they be interested in the vessel's sale, then the former proprietor of the Countess of Ellesmere "could" be willing to pay that sum. However, there is no evidence of any offer having been made and no proposal for any sale is recorded as having been presented to the shareholders by the board of directors.

In the summer of 1857 the Ellan Vannin's regular sailings were augmented by summer cruises from Douglas via Castletown and on to the Calf of Mann. Also further pleasure cruises were added via Peel and onwards to the north of Ireland. It would appear that the vessel was being utilised to her maximum. Sailings to Whitehaven and Liverpool were maintained whilst sailings to Glasgow and from Liverpool to Dundrum via the Isle of Man were introduced.

However it would seem that the company continued to sustain losses over the winter of 1857–58, and by March 1858 it had been decided to put the Ellan Vannin up for sale by public auction. She was sailed to Trafalgar Dock, Liverpool on 6 March, where she was laid up awaiting sale. She was offered for sale at the Broker's saleroom, 5, York Buildings, Dale Street, Liverpool on 18 March 1858. Either no sale could be agreed or no interest was expressed, and the Ellan Vannin resumed trading whilst a further public auction was scheduled for 20 May. She was advertised for sale with inspections being offered at Liverpool or Castletown. The sale commenced at the Quay, Castletown, at 12:00hrs on Thursday 20 May 1858, and it was reported that there was a good attendance. The bidding proceeded very slowly with the highest offer being £4,200 (equivalent to £451,238 in 2025) (a long way short of the £14,000 reputed to have been available in 1856) a sum which the directors and shareholders present would not accept. Again the Ellan Vannin resumed revenue service whilst further attempts were made to find a buyer. The Ellan Vannin's final excursion took her across to the coast lines of County Louth and County Down via Carlingford Lough on 25 June, before she left the Isle of Man for good.

Finally the Directors of the Castletown Steam Navigation Company (by now in serious financial difficulties) managed to find a buyer. Ellan Vannin was sold to Cunard & Wilson who were acting as agents for the Sardinian Government for £4,070 (equivalent to £437,272 in 2025). Upon purchase Ellan Vannin's name was changed to Archimedes.

The Castletown Steam Navigation Company subsequently went into liquidation. A further call on the shareholders of 10 shillings per share was made in order to finally clear the liabilities incurred by the Ellan Vannin for final claims of £600 (equivalent to £64,463 in 2025).

== Incidents ==
On the night of Tuesday 2 September 1856, whilst under the command of Capt. Skillicorn, the Ellan Vannin was involved in an incident in Douglas Bay with a small fishing boat which resulted in the loss of life of one of the boat's occupants, Patrick Featherstone. Visibility on the night was said to be good.

Four people had sailed in the boat in order to go fishing; Featherstone, two of his sons and another man, Daniel Cannon. Having anchored in the bay at approximately 19:30hrs they then moved to a position just off Port Skillion, Douglas Head, in order to be more protected should any steamer be making an approach to Douglas Harbour. At 22:00hrs the boat's occupants saw the Ellan Vannin steaming round Douglas Head and began to haul their anchor and get their oars ready so as to move out of the way; but before they could the Ellan Vannin ran them down. Cannon managed to jump clear just before the Ellan Vannin struck but he was then struck by one of her paddle floats, which pushed him under water. On coming back to the surface Cannon said he could see one of Featherstone's sons clinging to part of the wreckage and the other son nearby. Cannon managed to get the boy who was adrift and they proceeded to the wreckage. It was then they saw Featherstone but after calling to him he began to sink beneath the surface.

An inquest was held into the death of Patrick Featherstone on Tuesday 9 September 1856, presided over by the High Bailiff Wilson. Capt. Skillicorn together with various members of his crew, numerous passengers and Daniel Cannon gave evidence. The Court found a verdict of accidental death. In summing up, High Bailiff Wilson stated that he could find no wrongdoing on behalf of Capt. Skillicorn or the crew of the Ellan Vannin. Patrick Featherstone left a widow and six children. A charity was set up for his widow so as she may buy a small shop and various donations were made. At their Annual General Meeting of 17 December 1856, it was passed that the Castletown Steam Navigation Company should donate £10 to this cause. (equivalent to £93 in 2025)
