= Bombay Coast and River Steam Navigation Company =

Bombay Coast and River Steam Navigation Company was set up in Mumbai, India to handle the sea traffic between Bombay and other ports. In 1866, The British Government arranged for the company to head maintenance of steam ferries between Bombay and Mandva, Karanja, Revas, Dharamtar, Uran, and Ulva.
