= Mumbai =

Capital of Maharashtra, India

Mumbai Bombay
- Megacity
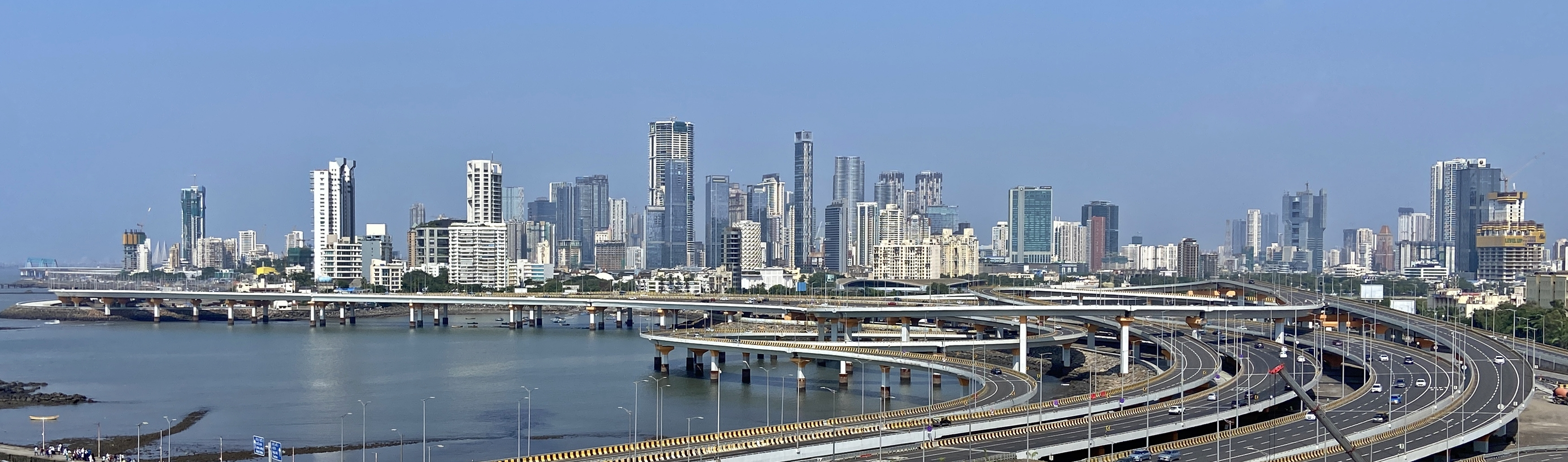
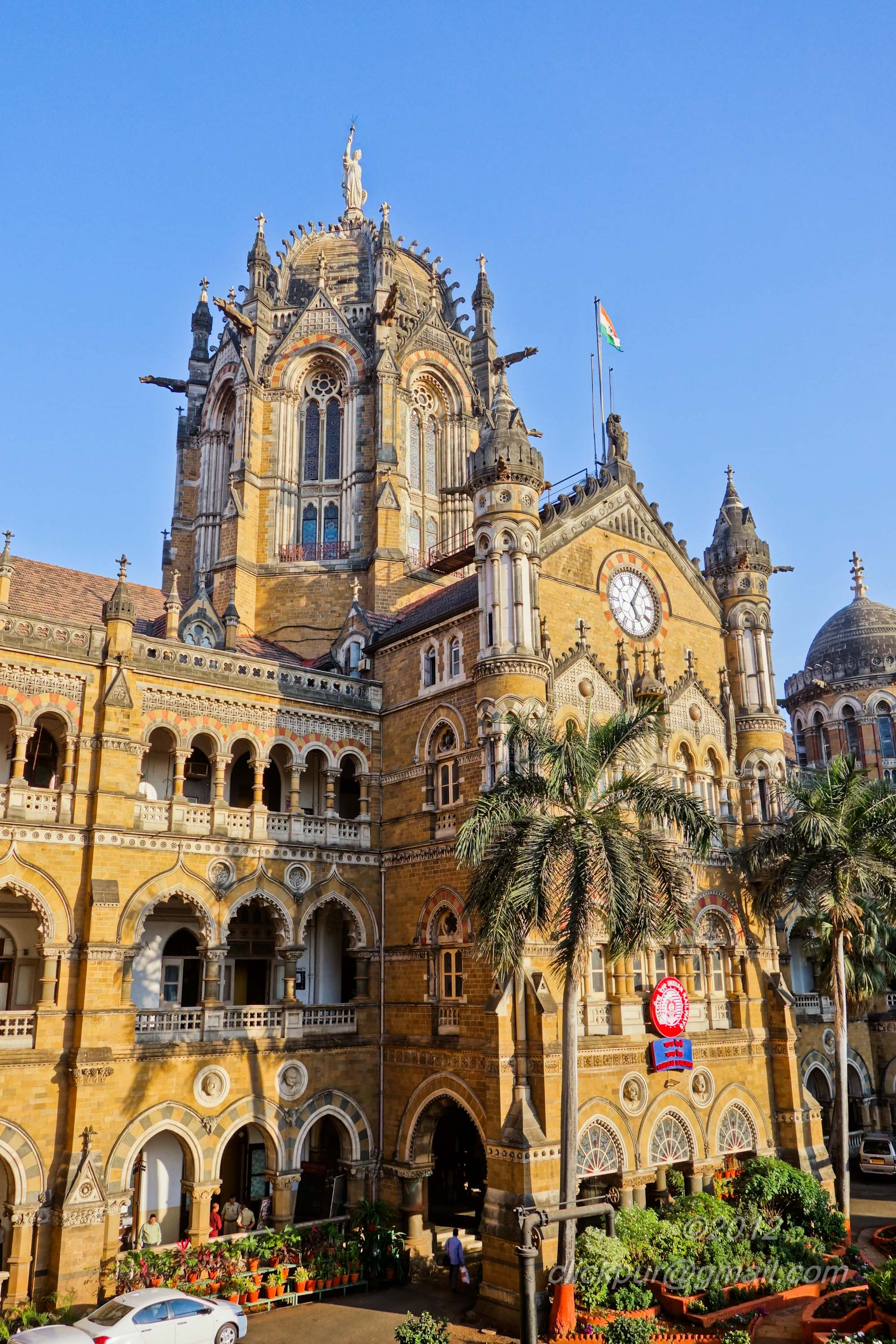
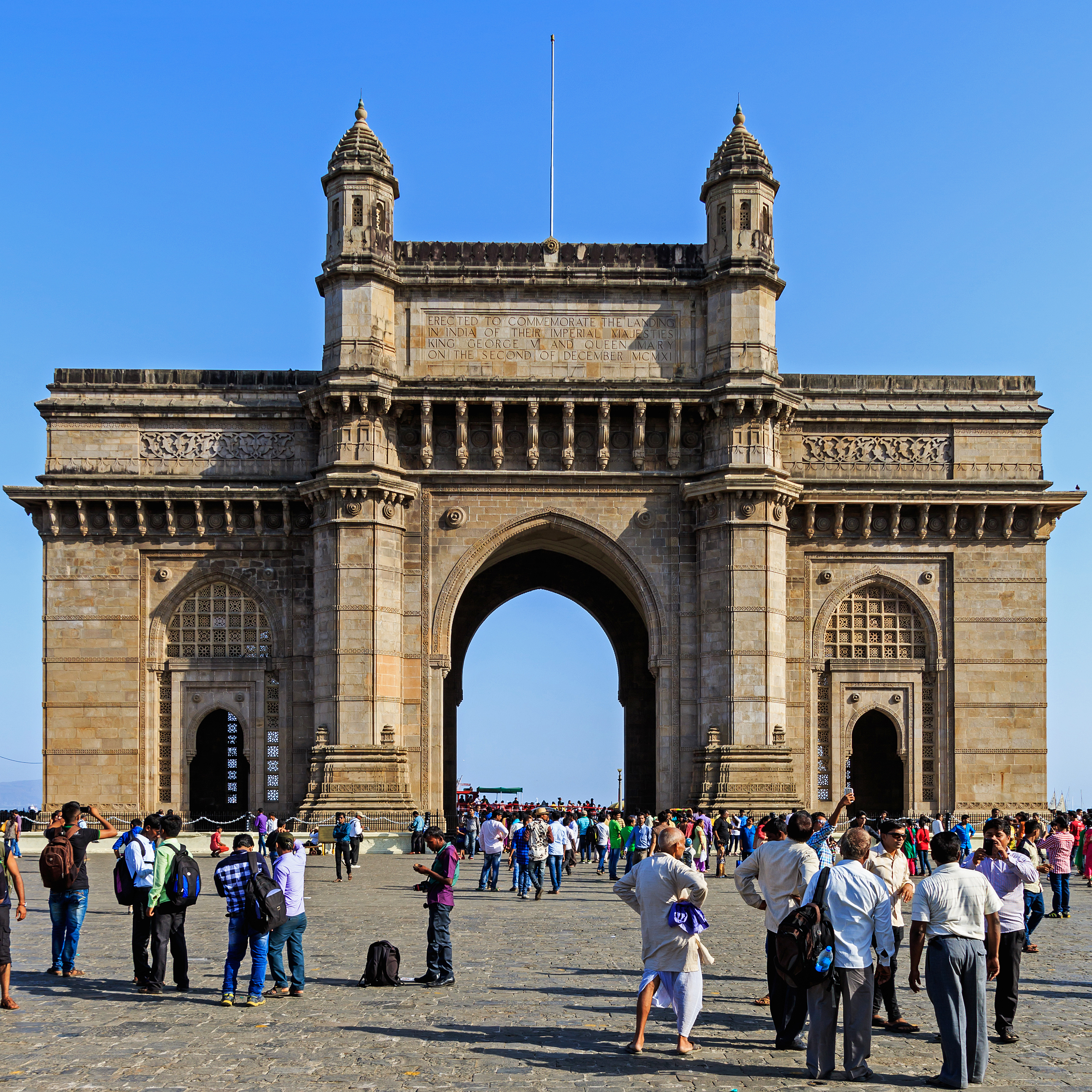
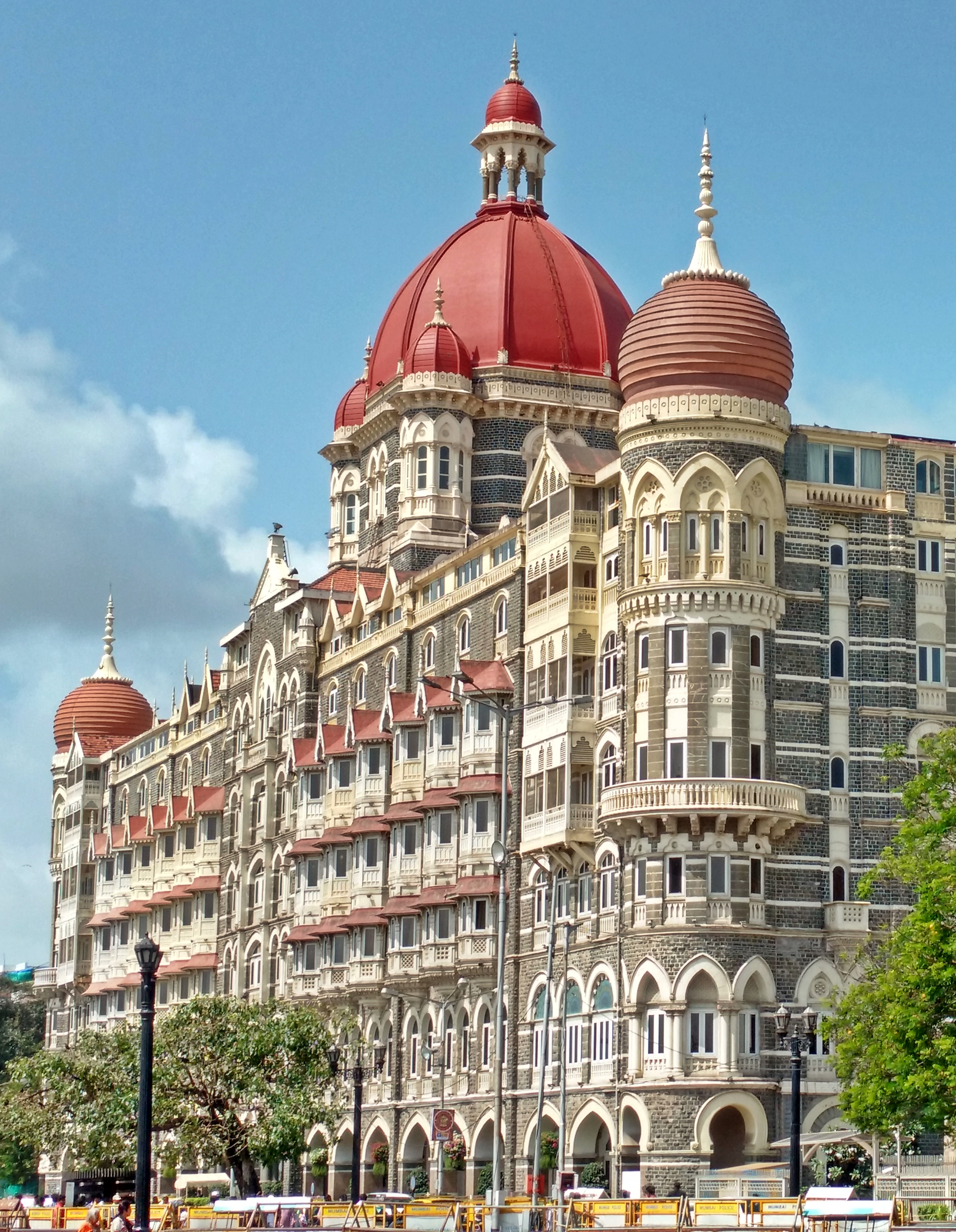
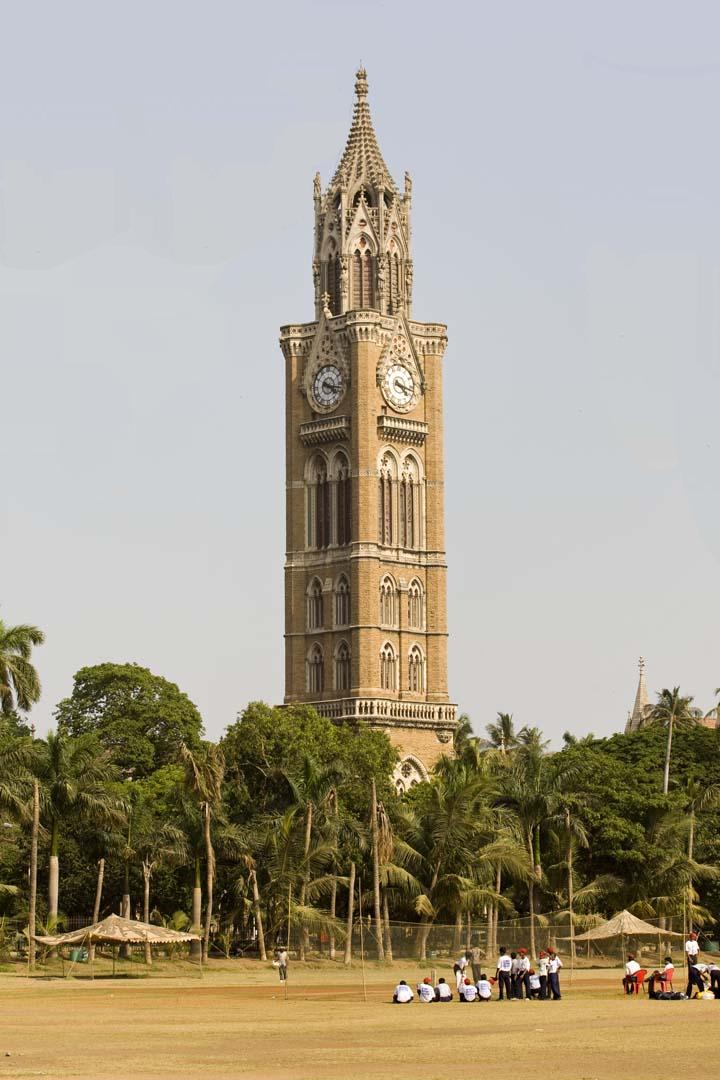
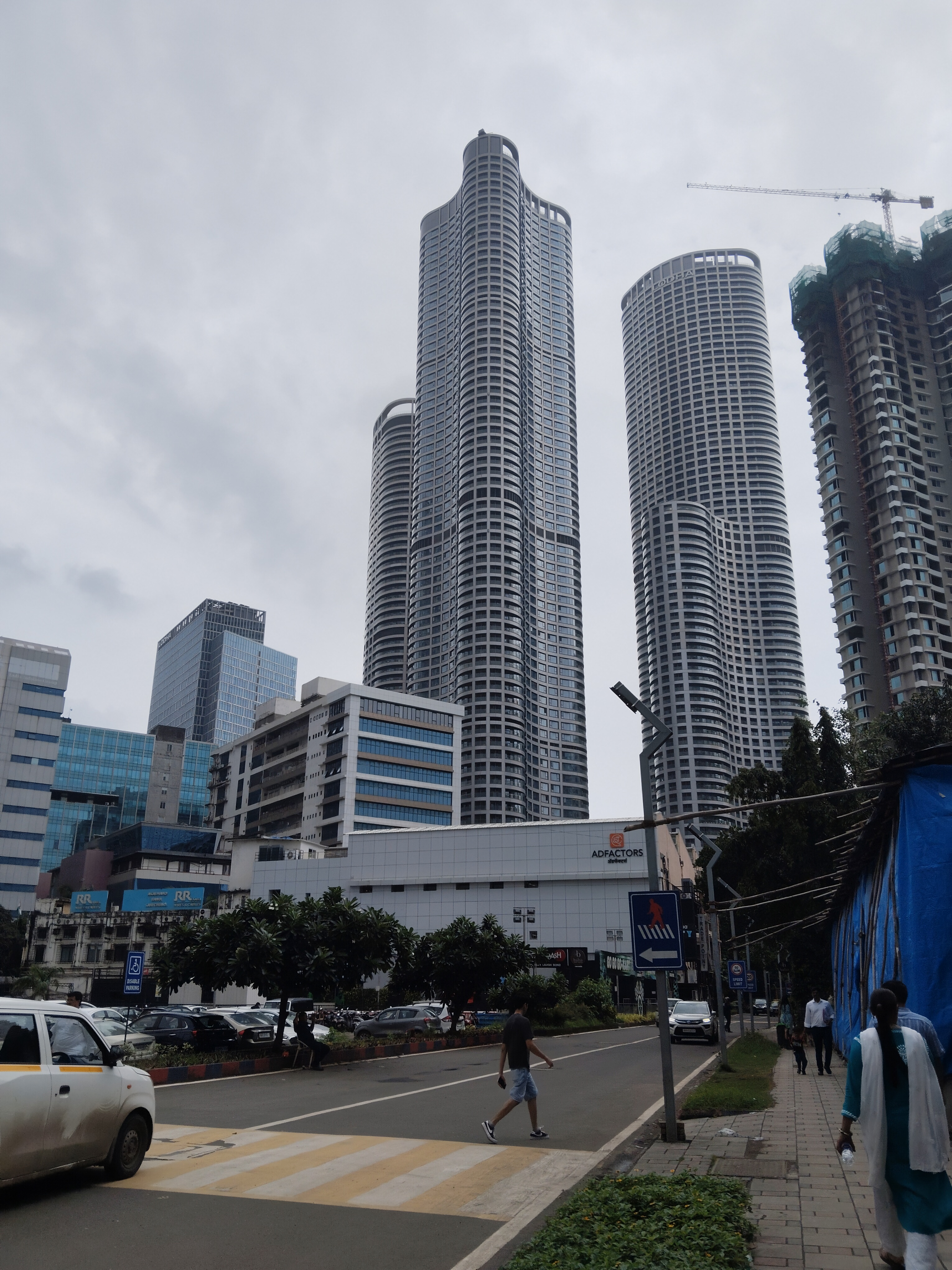
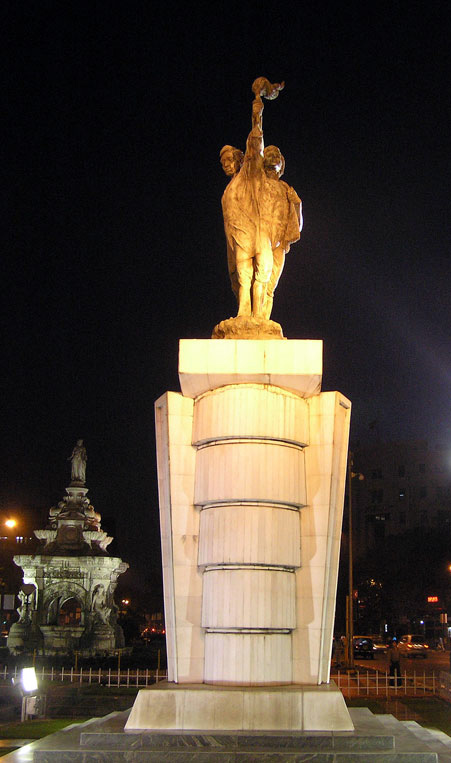
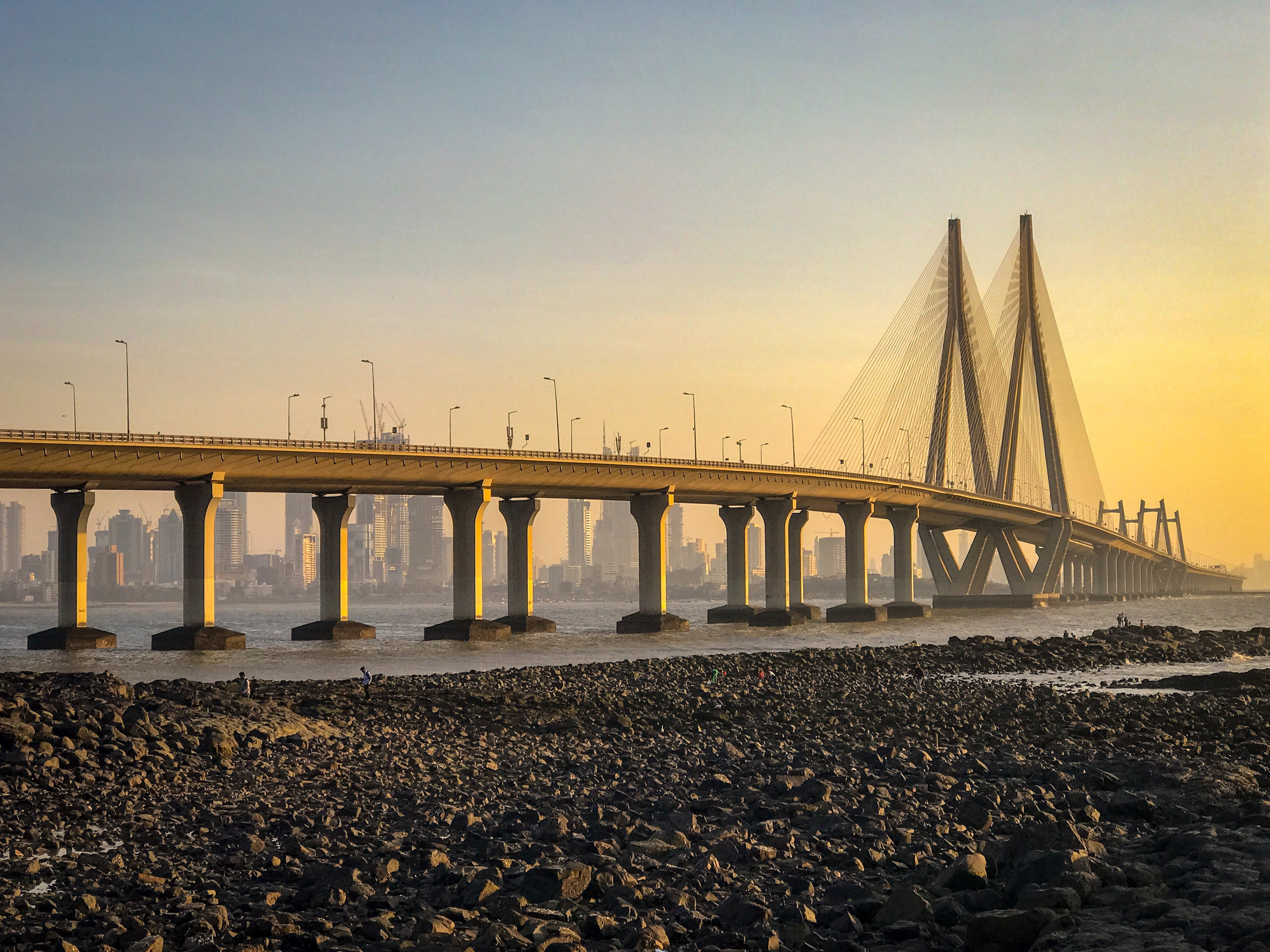
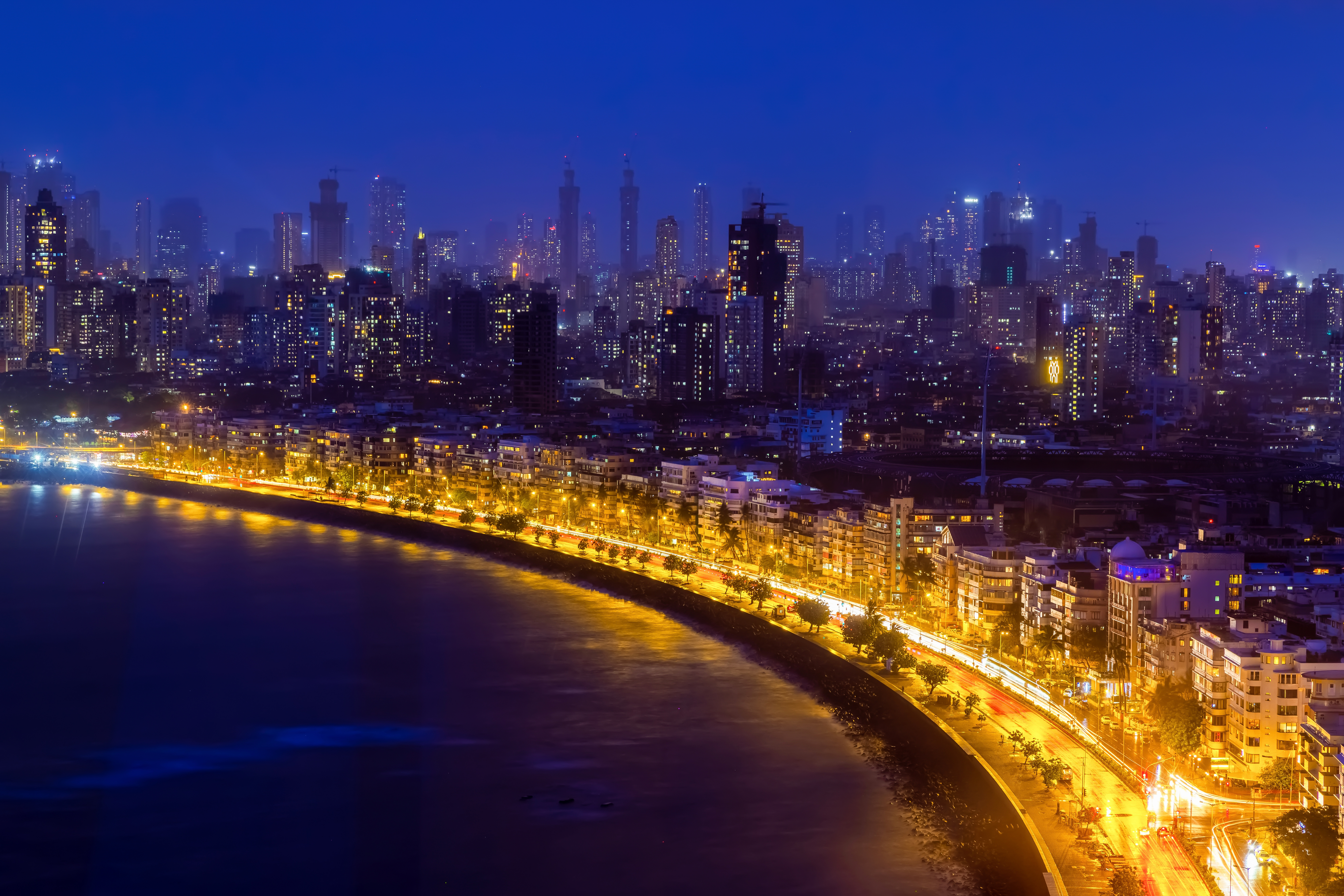
- Skyline of Worli and the Coastal Road Chhatrapati Shivaji Terminus Gateway of India Taj Mahal Palace Hotel Rajabai Clock Tower World One Hutatma Chowk Bandra–Worli Sea Link Marine Drive

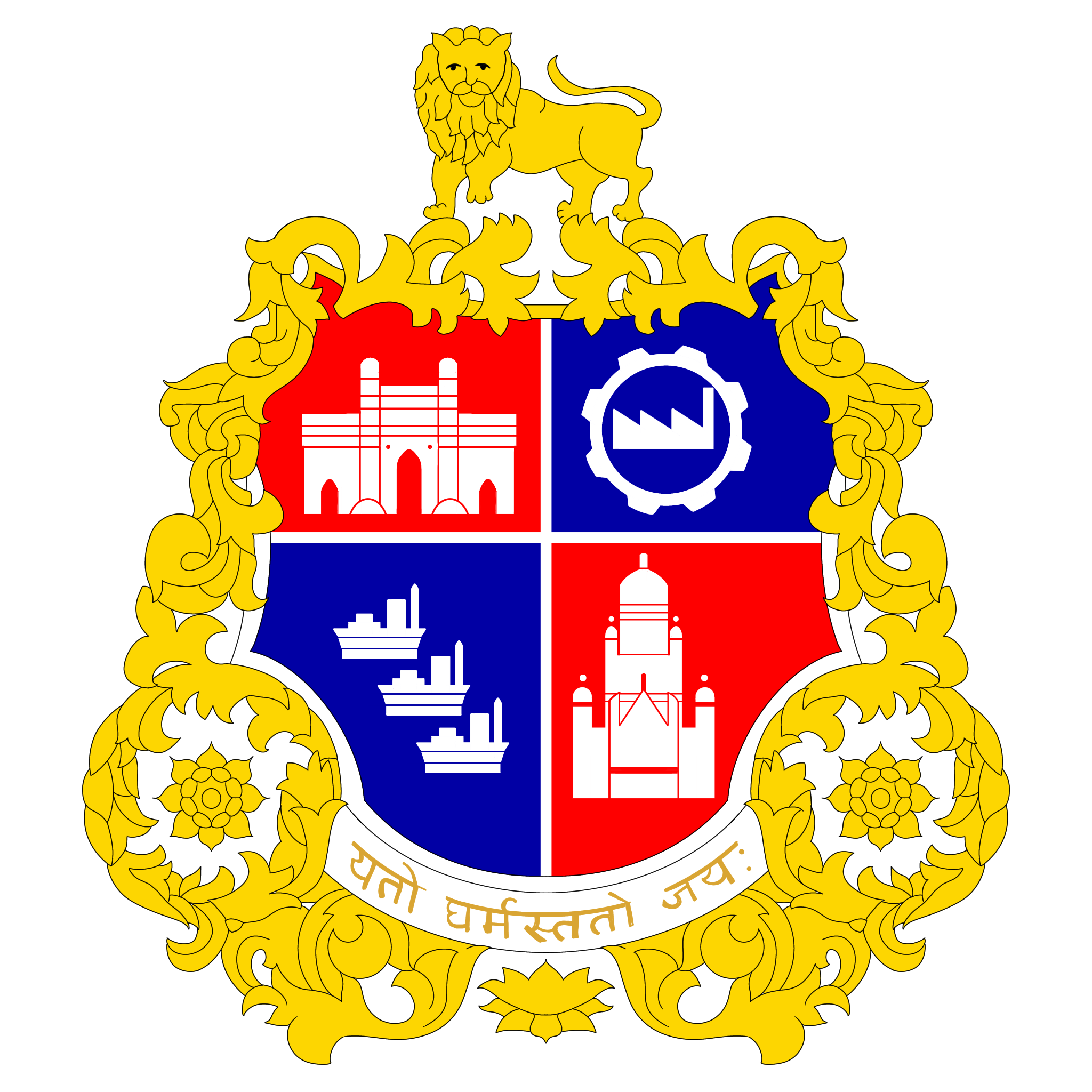
- Coat of arms
- Nicknames: City of Dreams, City of Seven Islands, Maximum City, The City That Never Sleeps
- Interactive map of Mumbai
- Location in Maharashtra Mumbai (India)
- Coordinates: 19°04′34″N 72°52′39″E
- Country: India
- State: Maharashtra
- Division: Konkan
- District: Mumbai City; Mumbai Suburban
- First settled: 1507; 519 years ago
- Named for: Mumbadevi

Government
  - Type: Municipal Corporation
  - Body: Brihanmumbai Municipal Corporation
  - Mayor: Ritu Tawde (BJP)
  - Deputy Mayor: Sanjay Ghadi (SHS)

Area
  - Megacity: 603.4 km^{2} (233.0 sq mi)
  - Metro: 4,355 km^{2} (1,681 sq mi)
- Elevation: 14 m (46 ft)

Population (2011)
  - Megacity: 12,442,373
  - Rank: 1st in India; 5th in Asia
  - Density: 20,620/km^{2} (53,410/sq mi)
  - Metro: 18,414,288; 20,748,395 (Extended UA)
- Demonym(s): Mumbaikar, Bombayite, Mumbaiite

GDP
  - PPP: US$400 billion
  - Megacity: ₹9.13 trillion (2024) (US$107.99 billion)
  - Metro: US$277 billion

Languages
  - Official: Marathi
  - Additional Official: English • Hindi
- Time zone: UTC+5:30 (IST)
- PINs: 400 001 to 400 107
- Area code: +91-22
- Vehicle registration: MH-01 (Mumbai South/Central; MH-02 (Mumbai West); MH-03 (Mumbai East); MH-47 (Mumbai North)
- HDI: ▲0.841 – very high
- Climate: Tropical savanna climate (Aw)
- Website: mumbaicity.gov.in

Mumbai, (Note: /mʊmˈbaɪ/muum-BY; Marathi: Mumbaī, pronounced [ˈmumbəi]) also known as Bombay, (Note: /bɒmˈbeɪ/ bom-BAY; its official name until 1995) is the capital city of the Indian state of Maharashtra and the financial capital of India. Located on the Konkan coast along the west coast of India, it has a deep natural harbour. As per the 2011 Census of India, it is the most populous city proper in India, with a population of almost 12.5 million, while the Mumbai Metropolitan Region, which is among the most populous metropolitan areas in the world, has a population of over 20 million. The city forms part of the Mumbai City and Mumbai Suburban districts and is administered by the Brihanmumbai Municipal Corporation, which was established in 1888.

Mumbai, originally an archipelago of seven islands, has evidence of human occupation dating back to the South Asian Stone Age. The islands were ruled by the Maurya Empire since the 3rd century BCE and were referenced by Ptolemy in his text in 150 CE. The islands were inhabited by the Marathi–speaking Koli people, whose deity Mumbā is believed to have given the city its name. The region was later ruled by several dynasties such as Satavahanas, Western Satraps, Chalukyas, Rashtrakutas, and Shilaharas, before coming under the control of the Delhi Sultanate, and later the Gujarat Sultanate during the Middle Ages. In 1535, the islands were ceded to the Portuguese, and in 1661, transferred to the British Crown as part of Catherine of Braganza's dowry, before being leased to the East India Company in 1668.

Under British Raj, Bombay was the capital of the Bombay Presidency, and developed into a major trading and administrative centre. Beginning in 1782, Mumbai underwent major transformation through the Hornby Vellard project, which involved the reclamation of land between the city's seven islands from the Arabian Sea. Alongside the construction of major roads and railways, the reclamation project, completed in 1845, unified the islands and helped transform Mumbai into a major seaport on the Arabian Sea. This infrastructure expansion, combined with the 19th-century cotton boom, drove rapid economic growth and further established Mumbai as an important commercial centre. The city played a major role in the Indian independence movement. After India's independence in 1947, Bombay became the capital of Bombay State and after the Samyukta Maharashtra movement, became the capital of Maharashtra in 1960.

Mumbai is classified as an alpha world city and serves as India's financial, commercial, and entertainment capital, attracting migrants from across the country. It is often compared to New York City. In the early 2010s, the city contributed nearly five percent of India's GDP, one-fourth of its industrial output, and one-third of its tax revenues. Being the capital of the state, it houses major government institutions including the Maharashtra Legislative Assembly, and the Bombay High Court. It is home to major scientific, nuclear, and financial institutions, as well as the headquarters of numerous Indian companies and multinational corporations. It is also the centre of Bollywood, one of the world's most prolific film industries, as well as Marathi cinema.

== Etymology ==
The name Mumbai (Marathi: मुंबई) originated from Mumbā or Mahā-Ambā, the name of the patron Hindu goddess (Kula Devata) Mumbadevi of the native Koli community, and from ā'ī, meaning "mother" in Marathi. By some accounts, the Koli community of Kathiawar and Central Gujarat introduced their deity Mumba from Kathiawar, where her worship continues to this day.

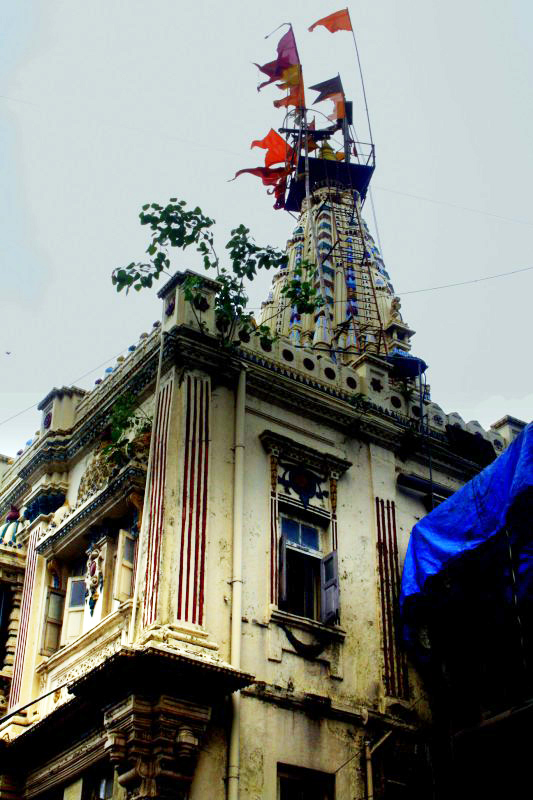
The Mumba Devi Temple, named for the goddess Mumba Devi, from whom the city of Mumbai may derive its name.

The oldest known names for the city are Kakamuchee and Galajunkja; these are sometimes still used. Portuguese writer Gaspar Correia recorded the name "Bombaim" after 1512 in his Lendas da Índia (Legends of India).Yule & Burnell 1996, p. 102 Some Anglophone authors have suggested this came from a supposed Galician–Portuguese phrase bom baim, "good little bay", with no scientific basis. (Note: Portuguese linguist José Pedro Machado attributes that interpretation to a deficient knowledge of the Portuguese language, mixing up the Portuguese word "bom" with the English "bay", from the English version of the name.) In 1516, Portuguese explorer Duarte Barbosa used the name Tana-Maiambu with Tana referring to the adjoining town of Thane and Maiambu referring to Mumbadevi or the neighbouring island of Mahim.

The form Bombaim is still commonly used in Portuguese. Many variant names were recorded in the 16th and the 17th centuries. (Note: 16th- and 17th-century names included Mombayn (1525), Bombay (1538), Bombain (1552), Bombaym (1552), Monbaym (1554), Mombaim (1563), Mombaym (1644), Bambaye (1666), Bombaiim (1666), Bombeye (1676), Boon Bay (1690) and Bon Bahia.) After the English gained possession of the city in the 17th century, the Portuguese name was anglicised to Bombay. Ali Muhammad Khan, imperial dewan or revenue minister of the Gujarat province, in the Mirat-i Ahmedi (1762) called the city Manbai.

The French traveller Louis Rousselet, who visited in 1863 and 1868, stated in 1877 that "Etymologists have wrongly derived this name from the Portuguese Bôa Bahia, or (French: "bonne baie", English: "good bay"), not knowing that the tutelar goddess of this island has been, from remote antiquity, Bomba, or Mumba Devi, and that she still ... possesses a temple". British officer and scholar John Briggs concurred that the name Bombay was a corruption of "Mumby", for a temple to Mumba Devi.

By the late 20th century, the city was called Mumbai or Mambai in Marathi, Konkani, Gujarati, Kannada and Sindhi, and Bambai in Hindi. The Government of India officially changed the English name to Mumbai in November 1995. This came at the insistence of the Marathi nationalist Shiv Sena party, which had just won the Maharashtra state elections, and mirrored similar name changes across India. Shiv Sena argued that the name 'Bombay' echoed British colonial rule. While Mumbai is still called Bombay by some residents and by some Indians from other regions, mention of the city by a name other than Mumbai has become controversial.

=== People from Mumbai ===
A resident of Mumbai is called Mumbaikar (pronounced [ˈmumbəikəɾ]) in Marathi, in which the suffix -kar means a 'resident of'. The term had been in use for quite some time, but it gained popularity after the official name change to Mumbai. Older terms such as Bombayite are used infrequently.

== History ==
=== Early history ===
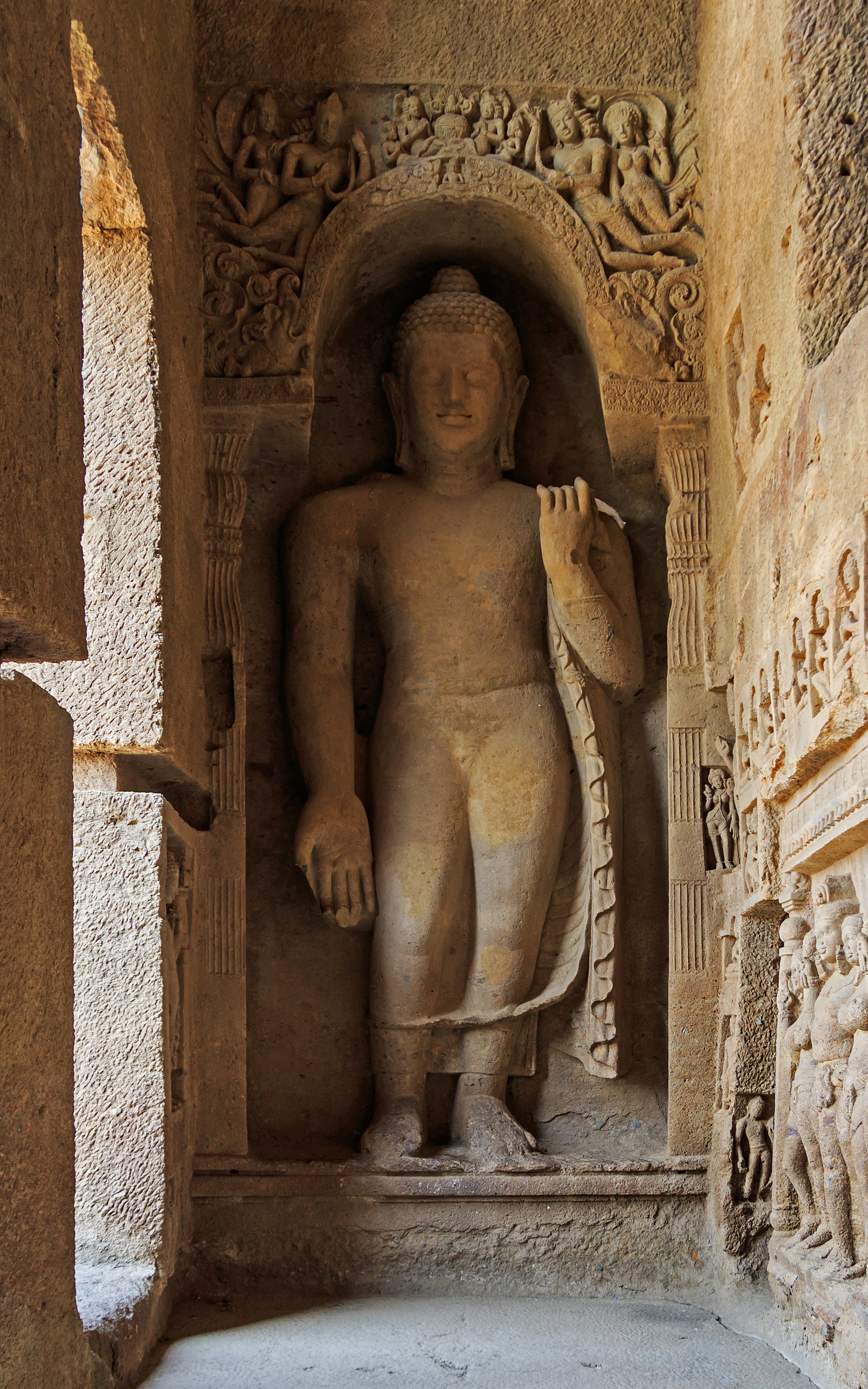
Kanheri Caves contain Buddhist artworks from the 1st century

Mumbai is built on what was originally an archipelago of seven islands: Isle of Bombay, Parel, Mazagaon, Mahim, Colaba, Worli, and Old Woman's Island (also known as Little Colaba). Pleistocene sediments near Kandivali suggest that the islands were inhabited since the South Asian Stone Age. In the 3rd century BCE, the islands became part of the Maurya Empire under Ashoka, followed by the Satavahana dynasty in the 2nd century BCE. The Koli fishing community populated the region during the beginning of the Common Era.

The Mahakali Caves in Andheri were cut out between the 1st century BCE and the 6th century CE, while the Kanheri Caves in Borivali, excavated in the 1st century CE, became an important centre of Buddhism in Western India. In the 2nd century, Greek geographer Ptolemy referred to the islands as Heptanesia (Ancient Greek: A cluster of seven islands). Between the 2nd century and 9th centuries, the islands were ruled by successive indigenous dynasties including the Western Satraps, Abhira, Vakataka, Kalachuris, Konkan Mauryas, Chalukyas, and Rashtrakutas, before being ruled by the Shilaharas from 810 to 1260. Important historic structures from this period that survive include the Jogeshwari Caves (between 520 and 525), Elephanta Caves (between 6th to 7th century), Walkeshwar Temple (10th century), and Banganga Tank (12th century).

In the late 13th century, King Bhima established a kingdom in the region and made Mahikawati (present-day Mahim) its capital. Around 1298, the Pathare Prabhus, among the earliest known settlers of the city, migrated to Mahikawati from Saurashtra in Gujarat. The Delhi Sultanate annexed the islands in 1347–48 and ruled them until 1407, during which they were administered by Muslim governors of Gujarat appointed by the sultanate. The islands were subsequently governed by the independent Gujarat Sultanate, established in 1407. Numerous mosques were built during the period, including the Haji Ali Dargah in Worli, erected in 1431 in honour of the Sufi saint Haji Ali. From 1429 to 1431, the islands were contested between the Gujarat Sultanate and the Bahmani Sultanate of the Deccan, and in 1493, Bahadur Khan Gilani of the Bahmani Sultanate attempted to conquer them but was repulsed.

=== Portuguese and British rule ===
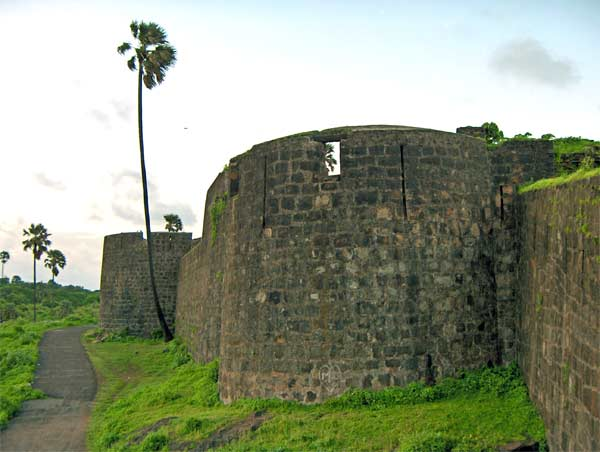
Madh Fort, built by the Portuguese

Apprehensive of the power of the Mughal Empire under Humayun, Gujarat Sultan Bahadur Shah signed the Treaty of Bassein with the Portuguese on 23 December 1534, through which the seven islands of Bombay, along with Bassein and its dependencies, were ceded to the Portuguese on 25 October 1535. During Portuguese rule, the islands were leased to Portuguese officials, and the name Bombaim came into use. Roman Catholic religious orders, particularly Franciscans and Jesuits, established several churches such as St. Michael's Church at Mahim (1534), St. John the Baptist Church at Andheri (1579), St. Andrew's Church at Bandra (1580), and Gloria Church at Byculla (1632). They also constructed several fortifications including the Bombay Castle, Castella de Aguada, and Madh Fort. Recognising Bombay's strategic natural harbour, the British competed with the Portuguese for control of the islands. On 11 May 1661, the islands were transferred by the Portuguese to the English as part of Catherine of Braganza's dowry upon her marriage to Charles II of England.

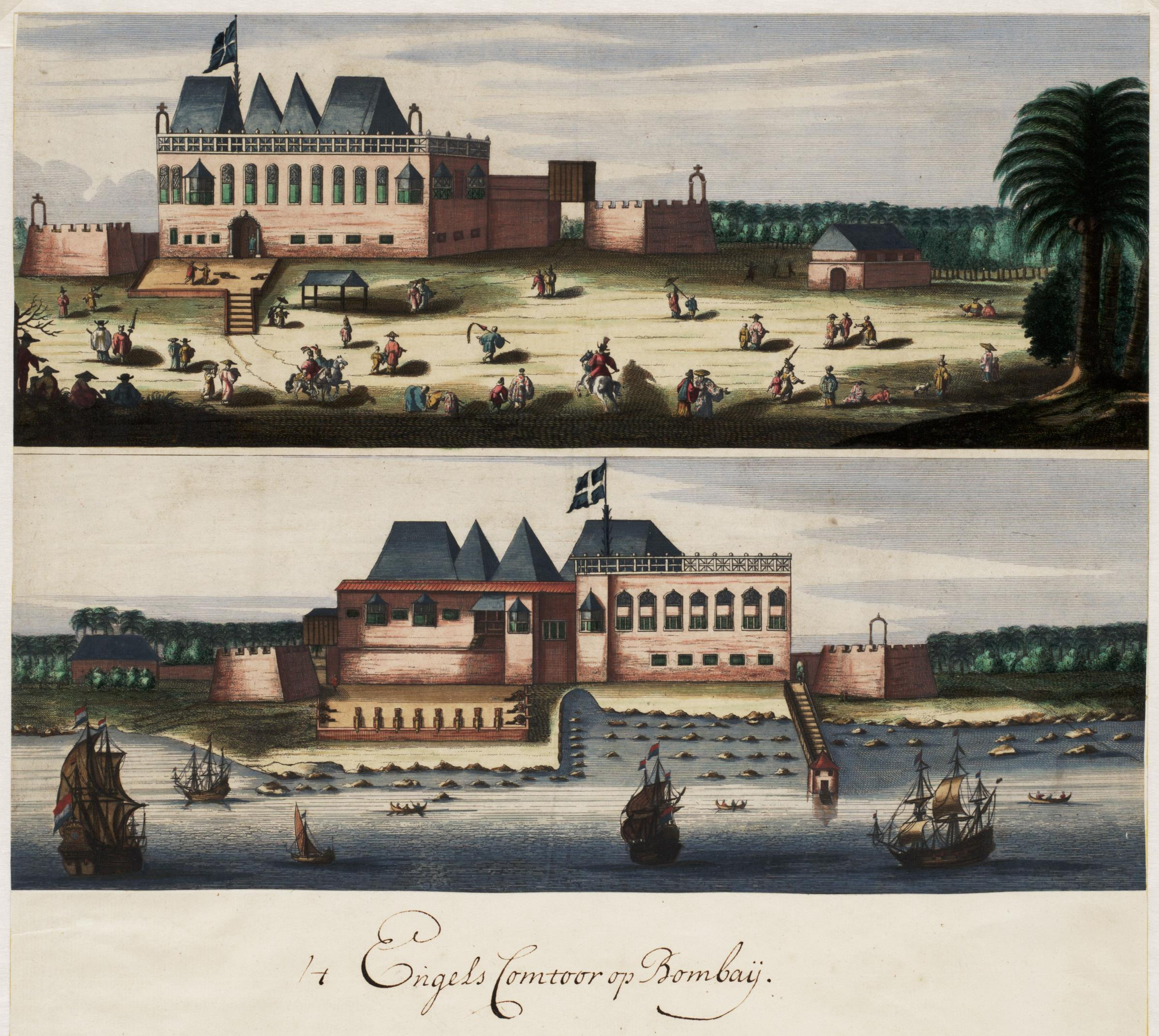
English Fort in Bombay, c. 1665

Under the Royal Charter of 27 March 1668, the English Crown leased these islands to the East India Company for an annual rent of £10. Under the Company rule, the population grew rapidly from about 10,000 in 1661 to 60,000 by 1675. However, the islands faced several attacks and incursions by Yakut Khan, the Koli admiral of the Mughal Empire, in October 1672, Rickloffe van Goen, the governor-general of Dutch India on 20 February 1673, and Siddi admiral Sambal on 10 October 1673. In 1687, the East India Company transferred its headquarters from Surat to Bombay, and it later later became the headquarters of the Bombay Presidency in 1662. It continued to face incursions, including another attack by Yakut Khan in 1689–90.

Portuguese control in the region ended when the Marathas under Peshwa Baji Rao I captured Salsette in 1737, and Bassein in 1739. By the mid-18th century, Bombay had developed into a major trading centre, attracting migrants from across the Indian subcontinent. The British occupied Salsette on 28 December 1774, and through the Treaty of Surat (1775), sought to secure control of Salsette and Bassein, contributing to the outbreak of the First Anglo-Maratha War. British control of Salsette was officially confirmed through the Treaty of Purandar (1776) and the Treaty of Salbai (1782), which formally settled the conflict.

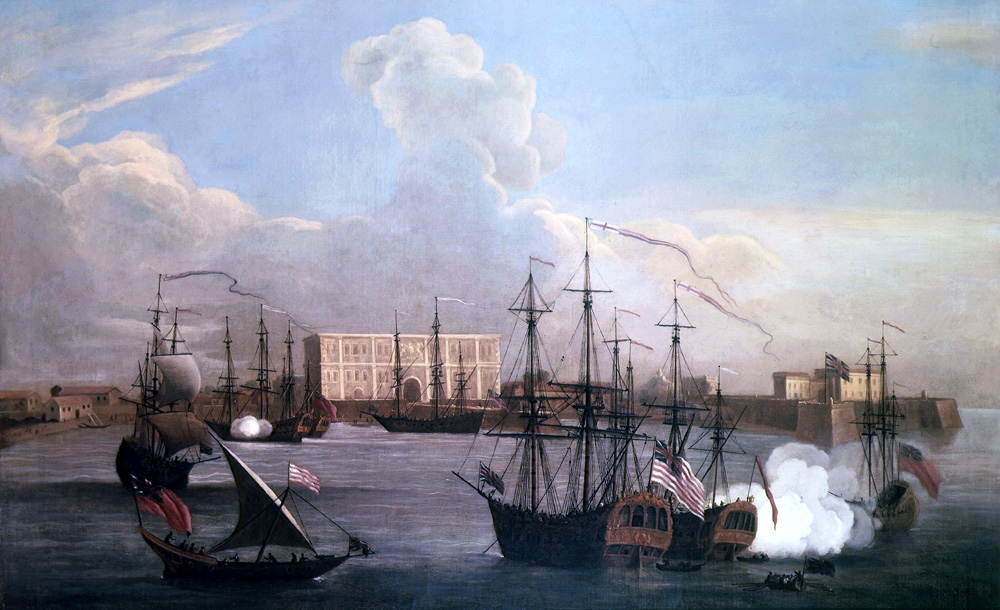
Ships at Bombay Harbour (c. 1731)

From 1782, the British undertook major engineering works to unite Bombay's seven islands by means of a causeway, the Hornby Vellard, completed by 1784. In 1817, the East India Company under Mountstuart Elphinstone defeated Baji Rao II, the last Peshwa of the Marathas in the Battle of Khadki, ending the resistance from native powers and established British control over the Deccan and the Bombay Presidency. As Bombay's economic importance grew rapidly, connectivity was improved and India's first passenger railway opened between Bombay and Thana on 16 April 1853. During the American Civil War (1861–1865), the disruption of cotton supplies from the United States transformed the city into a major cotton-trading centre globally, resulting in a significant economic boom. The opening of the Suez Canal in 1869 transformed Bombay into one of the largest seaports on the Arabian Sea and enhanced its strategic importance. However, the city was hit by a bubonic plague epidemic that killed more than 20,000 people and caused many residents to flee, significantly affecting the textile industry and its economy. In the 20th century, Bombay also became an important centre of the Indian independence movement, hosting the 1942 session of the Indian National Congress that launched the Quit India Movement, and the Royal Indian Navy Mutiny of 1946.

=== Independent India ===
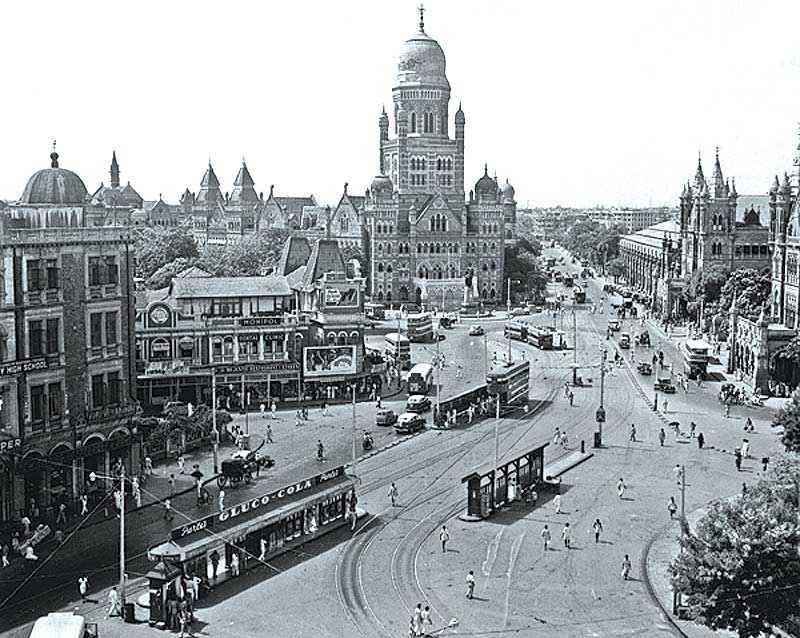
Municipal Corporation Building (center) with the Victoria Terminus (right) in 1950

After India's independence in 1947, the Bombay Presidency was reorganised into Bombay State, which was later expanded through the integration of several princely states, with Bombay serving as its capital. In April 1950, the Mumbai suburban and city districts were merged to create the Greater Bombay Municipal Corporation. During the 1950s, the Samyukta Maharashtra movement intensified, demanding a separate Marathi-speaking state with Bombay as its capital. However, debate continued over the city's status, with the Congress advocating for Bombay to become an autonomous city-state in 1955. While the States Reorganisation Committee proposed a bilingual state of Maharashtra–Gujarat with Bombay as its capital in 1955, the Bombay Citizens' Committee, representing Gujarati industrialists, lobbied for an independent status for the city.

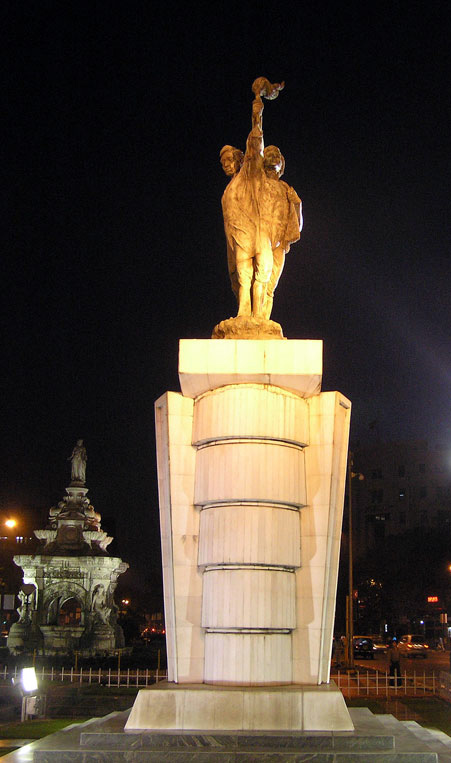
The Hutatma Chowk memorial honours the martyrs of the Samyukta Maharashtra Samiti

Following widespread protests in which 105 people died in clashes with law enforcement, Bombay State was reorganised along linguistic lines on 1 May 1960, creating the separate states of Maharashtra and Gujarat. The Gujarati-speaking regions became Gujarat, while Maharashtra was formed by combining the Marathi-speaking areas of Bombay State with territories from Central Provinces and Berar, Hyderabad State, and other princely states, with Bombay as its capital. The Flora Fountain was renamed Hutatma Chowk (Martyr's Square), and a memorial was erected in memory of those who died during the Samyukta Maharashtra movement.

Since the 1960s, Bombay experienced rapid expansion with areas such as Nariman Point and Cuffe Parade were reclaimed from the sea and developed. Industrialisation expanded the petrochemicals, electronics, and automobiles sectors. Major petroleum refineries such as the Mumbai Refinery at Trombay and BPCL Refinery were established. To coordinate the growing metropolitan region, the Government of Maharashtra established the Bombay Metropolitan Region Development Authority in 1975 to oversee planning and development across the city and its surrounding areas. In 1979, New Bombay was established by the City and Industrial Development Corporation from parts of Thane and Raigad districts as a planned satellite township to accommodate Mumbai's rapidly growing population. The Great Bombay Textile Strike, which involved nearly 250,000 workers across more than 50 mills, resulted in the shutdown of several textile mills, which were redeveloped later. On 26 May 1989, the Jawaharlal Nehru Port was commissioned at Nhava Sheva to relieve congestion at the Mumbai Harbour. In 1990, Greater Bombay was administratively divided into separate city and suburban revenue districts, although both continued to be governed by the same municipal administration.

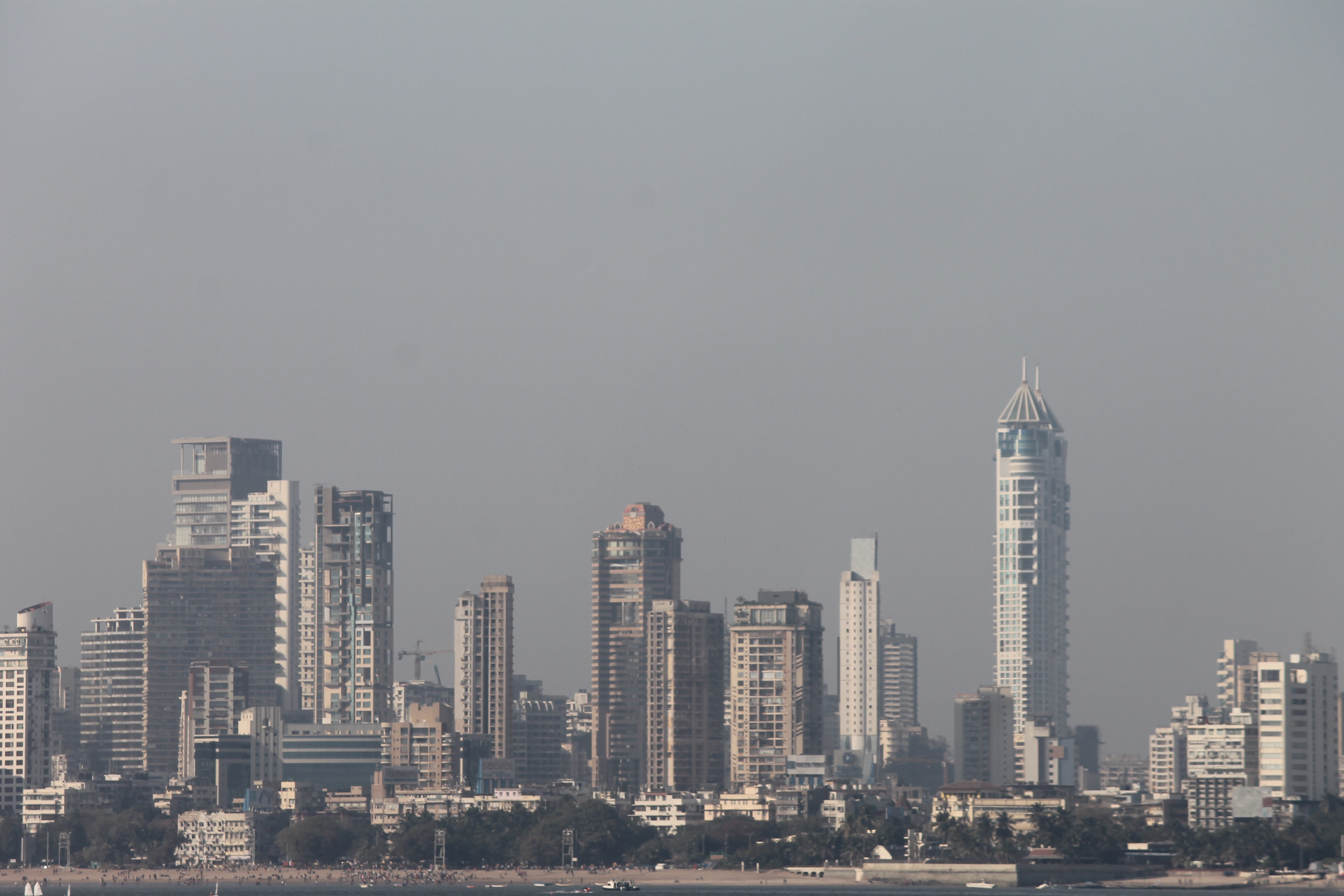
Skyline of Mumbai in the early 21st century

During the 1990s and 2000s, Bombay experienced a series of violent events and terrorist attacks. Following the demolition of the Babri Masjid in Ayodhya, the city witnessed severe Hindu-Muslim riots in 1992–93, resulting in more than 1,000 deaths. In March 1993, 13 coordinated bombings across the city by Islamic extremists and the Mumbai underworld killed 257 people and injured more than 700. The 2000s saw further terrorist incidents such as the 2006 Mumbai train bombings killed 209 people and injured over 700, and the 2008 Mumbai attacks that resulted in 173 deaths and 308 injuries over three days, and caused extensive damage to major hotels and heritage landmarks. In July 2011, three coordinated bomb blasts at the Opera house, Zaveri Bazaar and Dadar killed 26 people and injured 130. Despite these setbacks, Mumbai continued to grow as a major economic centre in the 21st century. It emerged as India's commercial and financial capital and a global financial hub, becoming home to major financial services companies and a focus of infrastructure development and private investment. It grew into one of South Asia's largest cities and is the home of Bollywood, one of the world's most prolific film industries.

== Geography ==
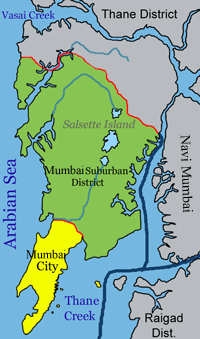
Mumbai consists of two districts, Mumbai City and Mumbai Suburban

Mumbai is spread over an area of 603 km^{2} (233 sq mi), and is divided into two districts–Mumbai City and Mumbai Suburban. The suburban district occupies 446 km^{2} (172 sq mi) and is divided into three tehsils–Andheri, Borivali, and Kurla. The city district-region located to the south is referred to as South Mumbai or "Island City", and occupies an area of 157 km^{2} (61 sq mi). The Mumbai Metropolitan Region includes portions of Thane, Palghar and Raigad districts in addition to Greater Mumbai, and covers an area of 4,355 km^{2} (1,681 sq mi).

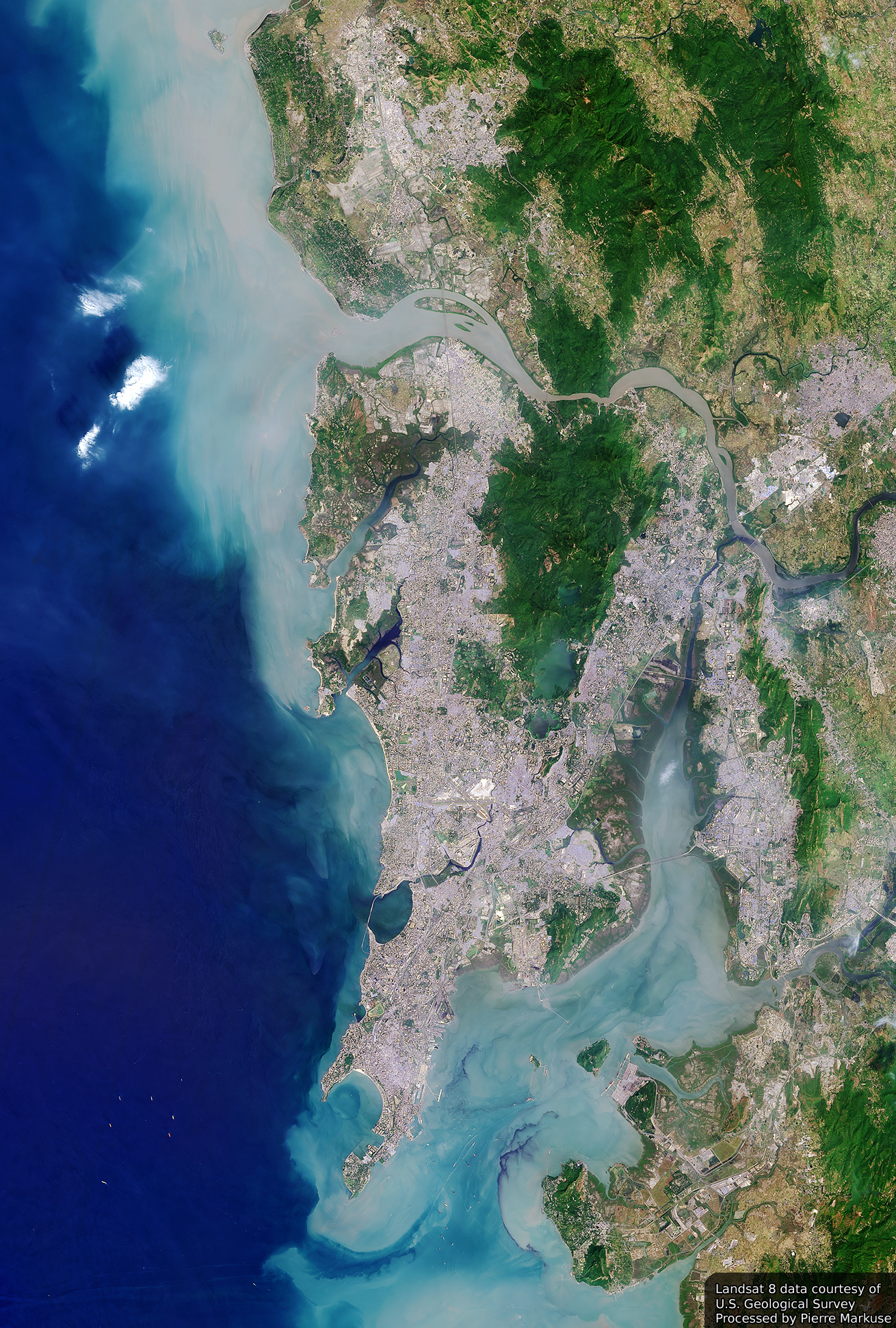
A 2016 satellite image of Mumbai

Mumbai is on a narrow peninsula located on the Salsette Island, which is bound by the Arabian Sea to the west, Thane Creek to the east, and Vasai Creek to the north. It lies at the mouth of the Ulhas River on the western coast of India, in the Konkan region. It shares the Salsette Island, with the Thane district. Navi Mumbai is located to the east of the Thane Creek, and Thane is situated towards the north of the Vasai Creek.

The majority of the city lies just above the mean sea level, with elevations ranging from 10 to 15 m (33 to 49 ft), and an average elevation of 14 m (46 ft). Northern Mumbai consists of hilly terrain, with the highest point in the city at 450 m (1,480 ft) in the Powai–Kanheri range. The coastline is indented with creeks and bays, stretching from the Thane creek in the east to Madh Marve on the western front. The eastern coast of the Salsette Island is covered with mangrove swamps, while the western coast is mostly sandy and rocky.

Soil cover in the city region is predominantly sandy. In the suburbs, the soil cover is largely alluvial and loamy. The underlying rock is black Deccan basalt, dating to the late Cretaceous and early Eocene eras. Mumbai sits on a seismically active zone with 23 fault lines. The area is a Seismic Zone III region, which means an earthquake of up to magnitude 6.5 on the Richter magnitude scale could occur.

The Sanjay Gandhi National Park (Borivali National Park) is situated partly in the Mumbai suburban and Thane districts, and covers an area of 103.09 km^{2} (39.80 sq mi). There are two major lakes in the city– Tulsi Lake and Vihar Lake. The city also draws its water supply from various dams located in Thane district including Bhatsa, Lower Vaitarna, Middle Vaitarna, Tansa, and Upper Vaitarna. The Powai Lake is an artificial lake within the city limits, is used only for agricultural and industrial purposes. The Mithi River is an urban river formed by the tailwater discharges of the Powai and Vihar lakes, and is highly polluted.

=== Climate ===
Mumbai

Climate chart (precipitation, max. and min. temperature)
J	F	M	A	M	J	J	A	S	O	N	D
1 31 17	1 32 18	0 33 21	1 34 24	12 34 27	523 32 26	868 30 25	624 30 25	341 31 25	93 33 24	16 34 21	4 32 19
- █ Average max. and min. temperatures in °C
- █ Precipitation totals in mm
- Source: Time and Date
Imperial conversion
J	F	M	A	M	J	J	A	S	O	N	D
0 88 63	0 90 64	0 91 70	0 93 75	0.5 93 81	21 90 79	34 86 77	25 86 77	13 88 77	3.7 91 75	0.6 93 70	0.2 90 66
- █ Average max. and min. temperatures in °F
- █ Precipitation totals in inches

Mumbai has a tropical wet and dry climate, classified as Aw under the Köppen climate classification. The central and northern suburbs have a tropical monsoon climate (Am) with heavier rainfall during the wet season. Mumbai has a nearly rainless stretch from October to May, with its most intense rainfall during July. A cooler season from December to February is followed by a hotter season from March to May. The period from June to the end of September is the southwest monsoon season.

The average annual temperature is 27 °C (81 °F). In the city, the average maximum and minimum temperatures are 31 °C (88 °F) and 24 °C (75 °F) respetively. In the suburbs, the daily mean maximum temperature ranges from 29 °C (84 °F) to 33 °C (91 °F). The daily mean minimum temperature ranges from 16 °C (61 °F) to 26 °C (79 °F). The record high is 42.2 °C (108.0 °F) set on 14 April 1952. The record low was 7.4 °C (45.3 °F), set on 27 January 1962. The average annual precipitation is 2,213 mm (87.1 in). The maximum annual rainfall ever recorded was 3,452 mm (136 in) for 1954. The most rainfall recorded in a single day was 944 mm (37 in) on 26 July 2005. The average total annual rainfall is 2,213.4 mm (87 in) in Mumbai City and 2,502.3 mm (99 in) for the suburbs.

Mumbai encounters occasional tropical cyclones. The worst cyclone encountered was on 23 November 1948, with gusts reaching 151 km/h (94 mph), and resulted in 38 deaths and 47 people missing. The city is prone to flooding during monsoons, Unplanned drainage systems and informal settlements are amongst the key drivers of Mumbai's frequent floods. The 2005 Mumbai floods caused 500-1000 deaths and financial losses of US$ 1.2 billion. To reduce flooding in Mumbai, the Maharashtra government implemented a flood mitigation plan that included restoring the Mithi River, restructuring the drainage system, and moving informal settlements.

Climate data for Mumbai (Colaba) 1991–2020 normals, extremes 1901–present
Month	Jan	Feb	Mar	Apr	May	Jun	Jul	Aug	Sep	Oct	Nov	Dec	Year
Record high °C (°F)	37.1 (98.8)	38.3 (100.9)	41.6 (106.9)	40.6 (105.1)	39.7 (103.5)	37.2 (99.0)	35.6 (96.1)	33.8 (92.8)	35.6 (96.1)	39.5 (103.1)	38.4 (101.1)	36.7 (98.1)	41.6 (106.9)
Mean maximum °C (°F)	34.4 (93.9)	34.9 (94.8)	35.8 (96.4)	35.1 (95.2)	35.4 (95.7)	35.0 (95.0)	32.1 (89.8)	31.7 (89.1)	32.7 (90.9)	36.4 (97.5)	36.3 (97.3)	35.3 (95.5)	37.6 (99.7)
Mean daily maximum °C (°F)	30.2 (86.4)	30.3 (86.5)	31.7 (89.1)	32.9 (91.2)	34.0 (93.2)	32.2 (90.0)	29.9 (85.8)	29.9 (85.8)	30.6 (87.1)	33.1 (91.6)	33.8 (92.8)	32.2 (90.0)	31.7 (89.1)
Daily mean °C (°F)	24.9 (76.8)	25.5 (77.9)	27.3 (81.1)	29.2 (84.6)	30.7 (87.3)	29.3 (84.7)	27.7 (81.9)	27.5 (81.5)	27.9 (82.2)	29.1 (84.4)	28.7 (83.7)	26.7 (80.1)	27.9 (82.2)
Mean daily minimum °C (°F)	19.4 (66.9)	20.4 (68.7)	23.0 (73.4)	25.3 (77.5)	27.3 (81.1)	26.6 (79.9)	25.5 (77.9)	25.2 (77.4)	25.1 (77.2)	25.1 (77.2)	23.6 (74.5)	21.2 (70.2)	24 (75)
Mean minimum °C (°F)	16.0 (60.8)	17.1 (62.8)	20.0 (68.0)	22.9 (73.2)	25.0 (77.0)	23.3 (73.9)	23.3 (73.9)	23.3 (73.9)	23.1 (73.6)	22.8 (73.0)	20.7 (69.3)	17.7 (63.9)	15.6 (60.1)
Record low °C (°F)	11.7 (53.1)	11.7 (53.1)	16.3 (61.3)	20.0 (68.0)	22.8 (73.0)	21.1 (70.0)	21.7 (71.1)	20.7 (69.3)	20.0 (68.0)	20.6 (69.1)	17.8 (64.0)	12.8 (55.0)	11.7 (53.1)
Average rainfall mm (inches)	0.6 (0.02)	0.4 (0.02)	0.7 (0.03)	0.2 (0.01)	15.9 (0.63)	506.0 (19.92)	768.5 (30.26)	471.9 (18.58)	355.6 (14.00)	81.7 (3.22)	8.5 (0.33)	3.4 (0.13)	2,213.4 (87.14)
Average rainy days	0.1	0.1	0.1	0.0	0.6	14.1	22.1	20.2	14.0	3.6	0.5	0.3	75.6
Average relative humidity (%) (at 17:30 IST)	62	62	63	66	68	77	85	84	80	72	65	63	71
Average dew point °C (°F)	15 (59)	16 (61)	19 (66)	22 (72)	24 (75)	25 (77)	25 (77)	24 (75)	24 (75)	22 (72)	19 (66)	16 (61)	21 (70)
Mean monthly sunshine hours	282.1	271.2	282.1	279.0	272.8	138.0	80.6	77.5	147.0	238.7	267.0	275.9	2,611.9
Mean daily sunshine hours	9.1	9.6	9.1	9.3	8.8	4.6	2.6	2.5	4.9	7.7	8.9	8.9	7.2
Average ultraviolet index	8	10	12	12	12	12	12	12	12	10	8	7	11
Source 1: India Meteorological Department (sun 1971–2000) Time and Date (dewpoints, 1985–2015)
Source 2: Tokyo Climate Center (mean temperatures 1991–2020), Weather Atlas

Climate data for Mumbai (Chhatrapati Shivaji Maharaj International Airport, Santacruz) 1991–2020, extremes 1951–2012)
Month	Jan	Feb	Mar	Apr	May	Jun	Jul	Aug	Sep	Oct	Nov	Dec	Year
Record high °C (°F)	37.4 (99.3)	39.6 (103.3)	41.7 (107.1)	42.2 (108.0)	41.0 (105.8)	39.8 (103.6)	36.2 (97.2)	33.7 (92.7)	37.0 (98.6)	38.6 (101.5)	37.6 (99.7)	37.2 (99.0)	42.2 (108.0)
Mean daily maximum °C (°F)	31.2 (88.2)	31.7 (89.1)	33.1 (91.6)	33.4 (92.1)	33.7 (92.7)	32.5 (90.5)	30.4 (86.7)	30.2 (86.4)	30.9 (87.6)	33.6 (92.5)	34.1 (93.4)	32.6 (90.7)	32.3 (90.1)
Daily mean °C (°F)	24.6 (76.3)	25.3 (77.5)	27.6 (81.7)	28.8 (83.8)	30.2 (86.4)	29.3 (84.7)	27.9 (82.2)	27.8 (82.0)	27.9 (82.2)	29.0 (84.2)	28.0 (82.4)	25.8 (78.4)	27.7 (81.8)
Mean daily minimum °C (°F)	16.9 (62.4)	18.1 (64.6)	21.1 (70.0)	24.2 (75.6)	27.0 (80.6)	26.6 (79.9)	25.5 (77.9)	25.2 (77.4)	24.9 (76.8)	23.9 (75.0)	21.4 (70.5)	18.4 (65.1)	22.8 (73.0)
Record low °C (°F)	7.4 (45.3)	8.5 (47.3)	12.7 (54.9)	16.9 (62.4)	20.2 (68.4)	19.8 (67.6)	21.2 (70.2)	19.4 (66.9)	20.7 (69.3)	16.7 (62.1)	13.3 (55.9)	10.6 (51.1)	7.4 (45.3)
Average rainfall mm (inches)	0.2 (0.01)	0.2 (0.01)	0.1 (0.00)	0.1 (0.00)	7.3 (0.29)	526.3 (20.72)	919.9 (36.22)	560.8 (22.08)	383.5 (15.10)	91.3 (3.59)	11.0 (0.43)	1.6 (0.06)	2,502.3 (98.52)
Average rainy days	0.0	0.0	0.1	0.0	0.7	14.0	23.3	21.4	14.4	3.9	0.6	0.2	78.6
Average relative humidity (%) (at 17:30 IST)	49	47	51	59	65	74	81	81	76	63	54	51	63
Source 1: India Meteorological Department
Source 2: Tokyo Climate Center (mean temperatures 1991–2020)

=== Pollution ===
Air pollution is a major issue in Mumbai. In 2013, the annual average PM2.5 concentration was 63 μg/m^{3}, which was 6.3 times higher than that recommended by the WHO Air Quality Guideline for annual mean PM2.5. The Central Pollution Control Board of the Government of India monitors and publicly shares real-time air quality data. In December 2019, the Indian Institute of Technology Bombay, in partnership with the McKelvey School of Engineering at Washington University in St. Louis, launched the Aerosol and Air Quality Research Facility at Mumbai to study air pollution in Indian cities. According to the 2016 report of the Central Pollution Control Board, Mumbai is the noisiest city in India.

== Demographics ==
Historical population

Year	Pop.	±%
1872	644,405	—
1881	773,196	+20.0%
1891	821,764	+6.3%
1901	812,912	−1.1%
1911	1,018,388	+25.3%
1921	1,244,934	+22.2%
1931	1,268,306	+1.9%
1941	1,686,127	+32.9%

Year	Pop.	±%
1951	2,966,902	+76.0%
1961	4,152,056	+39.9%
1971	5,970,575	+43.8%
1981	8,243,405	+38.1%
1991	9,925,891	+20.4%
2001	11,914,398	+20.0%
2011	12,442,373	+4.4%

Based on Census data of the Government of India
Source: MMRDA

In the 2011 census, Mumbai had a population of 12,442,373 inhabitants, with an estimated population density of about 20,482/km^{2} (53,050/sq mi) and averate living space of 4.5 m^{2} (48 sq ft) per person. The Mumbai Metropolitan Region was home to 18,394,912 people in 2011. The sex ratio as 853 females per 1,000 males, lower than the national average of 914 females per 1,000 males. The child sex ratio was 913 females per 1000 males.

The low sex ratio is partly because of the large number of male migrants who come to the city to work. The city had a literacy rate of 89.73%, higher than the national average of 86.7%. There were 4.2 million households in 2008, which was projected to increase to 6.6 million by 2020. The number of households with annual incomes of above 2 million rupees was projected to be about 10%, and households with incomes from 1 to 2 million is estimated to be 15% in 2020.

As per the 2011 census, there were 5,633,709 slum-dwellers living in 1,135,514 households. Dharavi, located in central Mumbai, is the largest slum and houses about a million people in an area of 2.39 km^{2} (0.92 sq mi), making it one of the most densely populated areas on Earth. The number of migrants to Mumbai from outside Maharashtra during the 1991–2001 decade was 1.12 million, which amounted to 54.8% of the net addition to the population of Mumbai.

=== Ethnic groups and religions ===
Religion in Mumbai (2011)
Religion	Percent
Hinduism	65.99%
Islam	20.65%
Buddhism	4.85%
Jainism	4.10%
Christianity	3.27%
Sikhism	0.49%
Other or not stated	0.63%

As per the 2011 Census, Hinduism is the major religion with nearly two-thirds of the population adhering to it, followed by Islam, Buddhism, Jainism, Christianity, and Sikhism. The oldest Muslim communities in Mumbai include the Dawoodi Bohras, Ismaili Khojas, and Konkani Muslims. Native Christians include East Indian Catholics, converted by the Portuguese during the 16th century.

Jews settled in Mumbai during the 18th century. The Bene Israeli Jewish community of Mumbai, who migrated from the Konkan villages, south of Mumbai, are believed to be the descendants of the Jews of Israel shipwrecked off the Konkan coast, probably in the year 175 BCE, during the reign of the Greek ruler, Antiochus IV Epiphanes. Mumbai is home to the largest population of Parsi Zoroastrians in the world, numbering about 60,000, however their population is declining rapidly. Parsis migrated to India from Greater Iran following the Muslim conquest of Persia in the seventh century. The ethnic demographics in the Mumbai consists of Maharashtrians (32%), Gujaratis (20%), with the rest hailing from other parts of India.

=== Language ===
Languages in Mumbai (2011)
Language	Percent
Marathi	35.4%
Hindi	24.8%
Urdu	11.7%
Gujarati	11.4%
Tamil	2.37%
Others	14.5%

Marathi is the most spoken language in the city. Hindi is the second–most-spoken language, followed by Urdu and Gujarati. Marathi and English serve as the official languages of the government. English is the principal language of the city's white collar workforce. A colloquial form of Hindi, known as Bombay Hindi is spoken on the streets. Many Hindi speakers are workers from Uttar Pradesh and Bihar who migrate seasonally to Mumbai to work as labourers.

== Economy ==
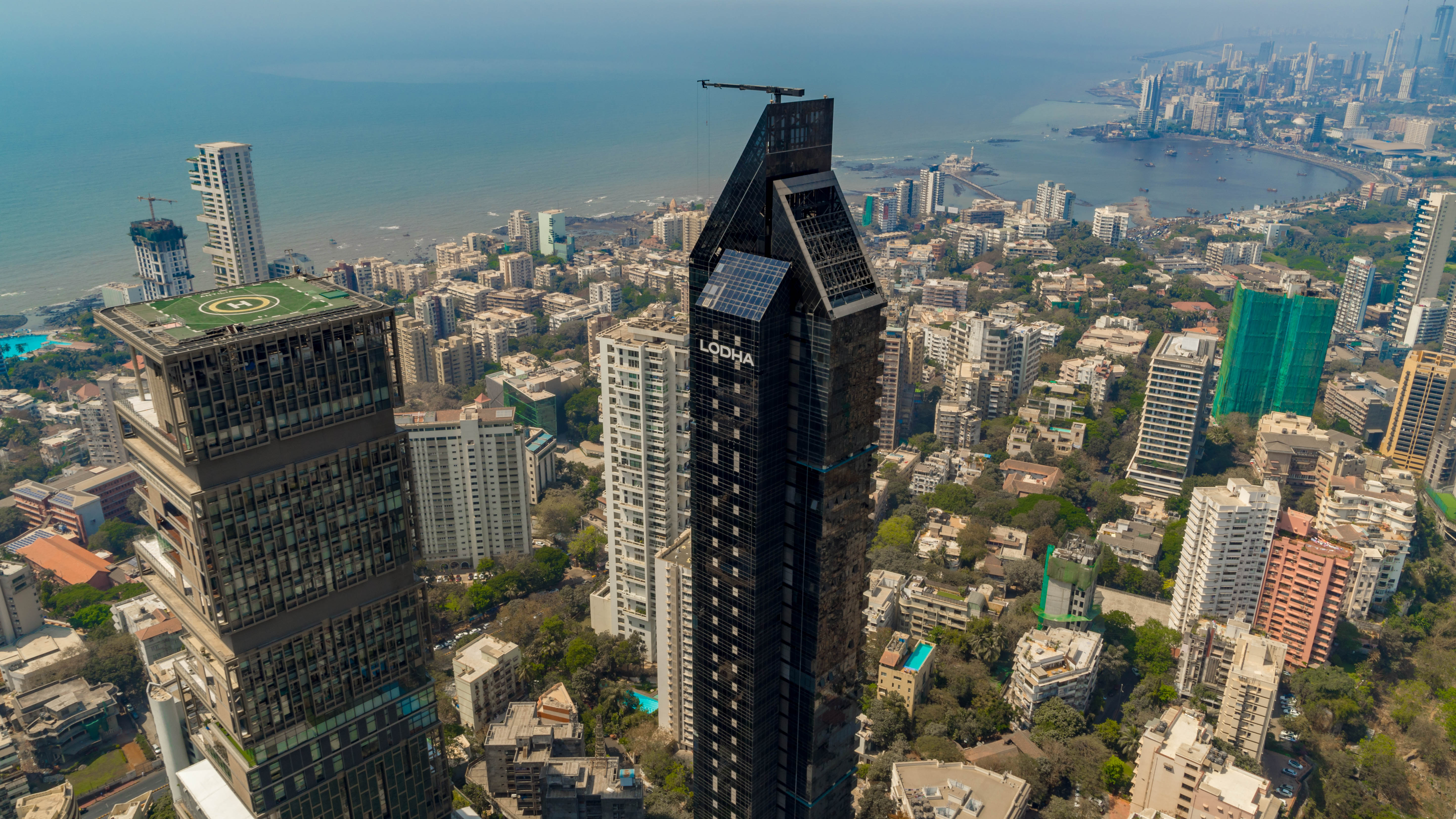
Skyscrapers on Altamount Road

Mumbai is known as the financial and commercial capital of India, generating about five percent of the country's total GDP. In 2023–24, it contributed to 19.8% of the GDP of the state of Maharashtra. In the early 2010s, the city contributed to one-third of the total tax revenues and nearly one-fourth of the industrial output of the country. In 2017–18, estimates of the economy of the Mumbai Metropolitan Region ranged from $368 billion to $400 billion (PPP & metro GDP), ranking it amongst the top two most-productive metro area of India. In 2006, Mumbai employed 10% of the nation's factory workforce, contributed to 25% of the industrial output, 33% of the income tax collections, 60% of the customs duty collections, 20% of the central excise tax collections, 40% of the foreign trade, and generated ₹40 billion (equivalent to ₹140 billion or US$1.5 billion in 2026) in corporate tax.

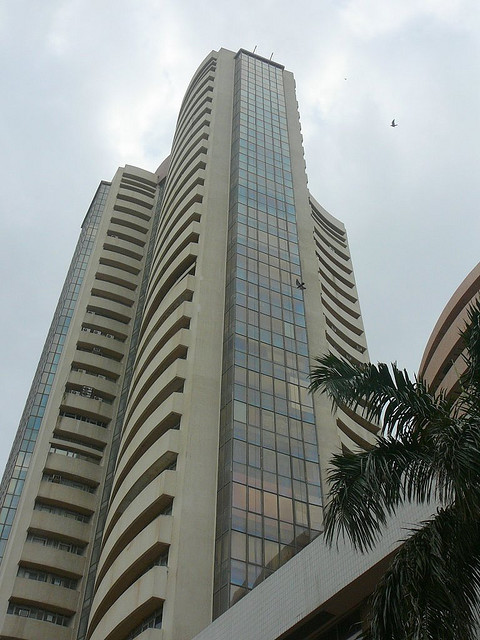
The Bombay Stock Exchange is the oldest in Asia

Until the 1970s, Mumbai owed its prosperity largely to textile mills and seaport, but the local economy has since then diversified to include finance, engineering, diamond-polishing, healthcare, and information technology. It witnessed an economic boom since the liberalisation of 1991, with the finance sector booming in the mid-nineties, and the information technology (IT), export, services, and outsourcing booming in the 2000s. In the 21st century. the key sectors contributing to the city's economy are: finance, gems & jewellery, leather processing, IT and ITES, textiles, petrochemical, electronics manufacturing, automobiles, and entertainment. The port and shipping industry is well established. Dharavi, in central Mumbai, has a large recycling industry and is home to about 15,000 single-room factories.

The city is home to many of India's conglomerates and five of the Fortune Global 500 companies. It also houses the Reserve Bank of India , the Bombay Stock Exchange (BSE), the National Stock Exchange of India, and financial sector regulators such as the Securities and Exchange Board of India. Nariman Point and Bandra Kurla Complex are Mumbai's major financial centres. The BSE, established in 1875, is the oldest stock exchange in Asia. In 2019, Mumbai was among the world's top ten cities by number of billionaires. With a total wealth of around $960 billion, it is the wealthiest Indian city and one of the richest cities in the world. As of 2008, the Globalization and World Cities Research Network has ranked Mumbai as an "alpha world city", third in its categories of Global cities. Mumbai is the third most expensive office market in the world, and has been ranked among the fastest cities in the country for business startup.

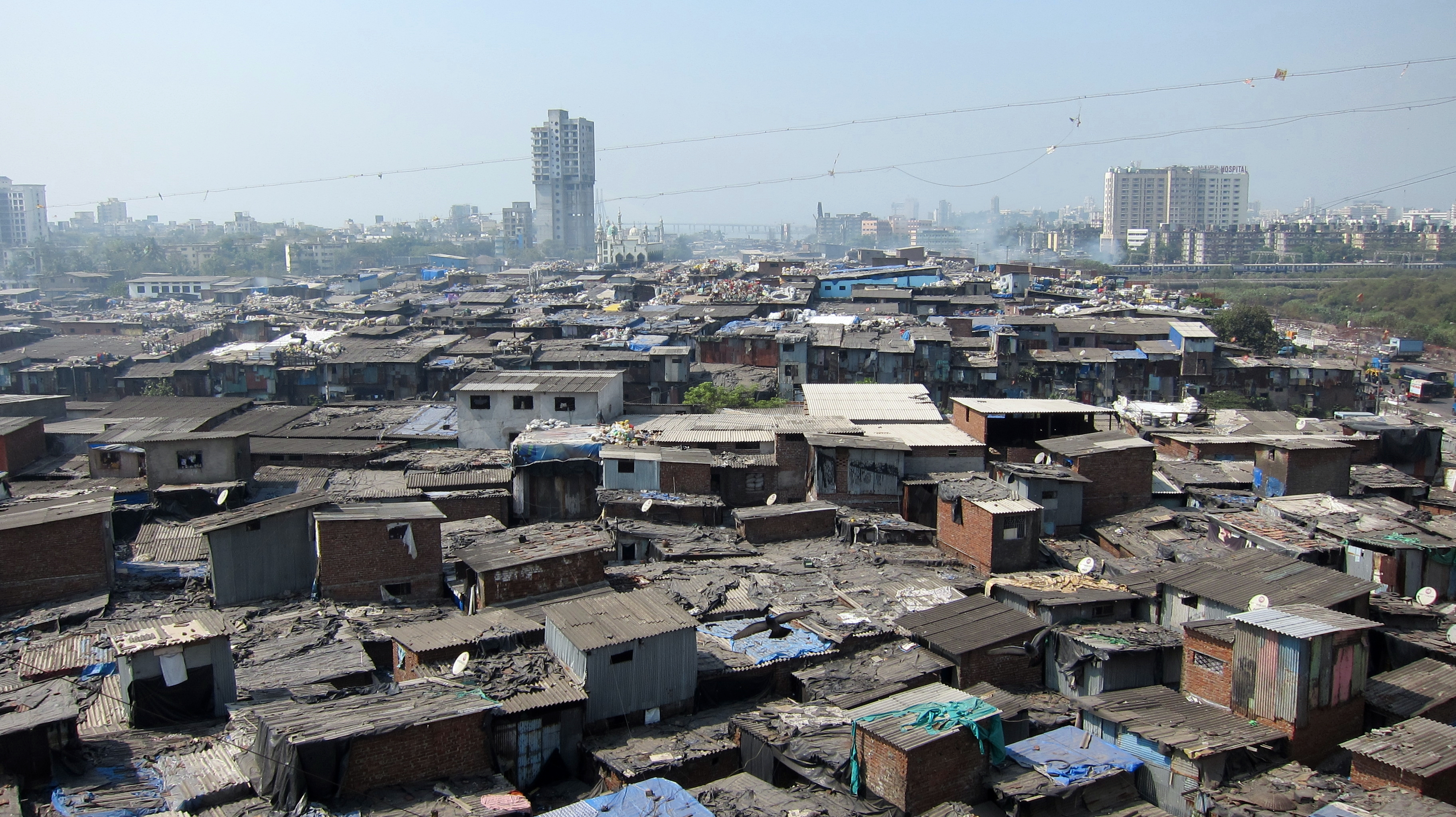
Dharavi is one of the largest slums in the world

Mumbai is one of the world's most unequal cities in terms of wealth distribution and inclusivity. According to the World Bank, in 2010, the median income was ₹20,000 (equivalent to ₹49,000 or US$520 in 2026) while the average income was ₹40,000 (equivalent to ₹98,000 or US$1,000 in 2026). The city has a large unskilled and semi-skilled self-employed population, and other blue collar professions, often migrating from other regions. About 41.8% of the city's population live in urban slums, though slums occupy just around seven per cent of the city's total land area.

Mumbai's overall per capita residential area is 8.3 m^{2} (89 sq ft). In the city's slums, it drops to 2.73 m^{2} (29.4 sq ft). Dharavi hosts nearly a million people, and is one of the largest slums in the world. The median rental cost of a one-bedroom apartment in Mumbai proper was about ₹30,000 (equivalent to ₹41,000 or US$430 in 2026) in 2019. With available land at a premium, Mumbai residents often endure cramped housing, far from workplaces, with long commutes on crowded mass transits or roads clogged with traffic. Suburban residents spend a significant amount of time commuting southward to the central commercial district.

== Government and politics ==
=== Civic administration ===
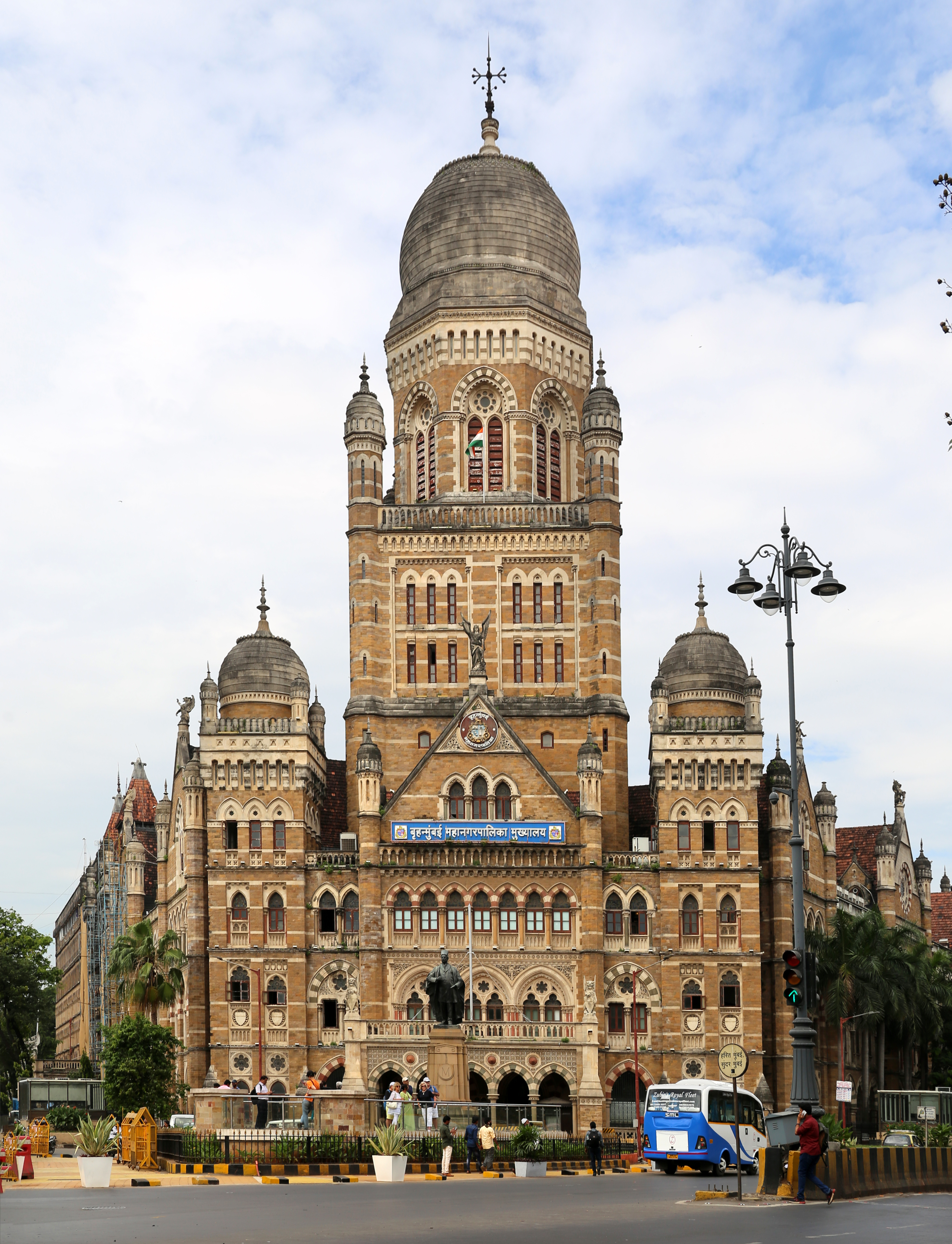
Headquarters of the Brihanmumbai Municipal Corporation (BMC), the largest civic organisation in the country.

Greater Mumbai (or Brihanmumbai), an area of 603 km^{2} (233 mi^{2}), consisting of the Mumbai City and Mumbai Suburban districts, extends from Colaba in the south, to Mulund and Dahisar in the north, and Mankhurd in the east. Its population as per the 2011 census was 12,442,373.

It is administered by the Brihanmumbai Municipal Corporation (BMC), also referred to as the Municipal Corporation of Greater Mumbai, and formerly known as the Bombay Municipal Corporation. The BMC is in charge of the civic and infrastructure needs of the metropolis. BMC is the richest civic body in India and among the wealthiest in Asia. As per the Ministry of Housing and Urban Affairs, the BMC had a revenue of ₹378.91 billion (US$4.0 billion) and an expenditure of ₹338.25 billion (US$3.6 billion) in 2022–23. Taxes contributed to 17.1% of the revenue, with 51.2% of the income coming from other sources, and 31.8% from government grants.

The BMC is headed by a mayor, who serves for a term of two and a half years, is chosen through an indirect election by the councillors from among themselves. The municipal commissioner is the chief executive officer and head of the executive arm of the municipal corporation. The commissioner, who is an Indian Administrative Service officer appointed by the state government, is responsible for implementing the executive policies. The commissioner is appointed for a fixed term, and the powers of the commissioner are those provided by statute and those delegated by the corporation or the standing committee.

In 2014, The Brihanmumbai Municipal Corporation was ranked ninth out of 21 cities for best governance & administrative practices in India, scoring 3.5 out of 10, compared to the national average of 3.3.

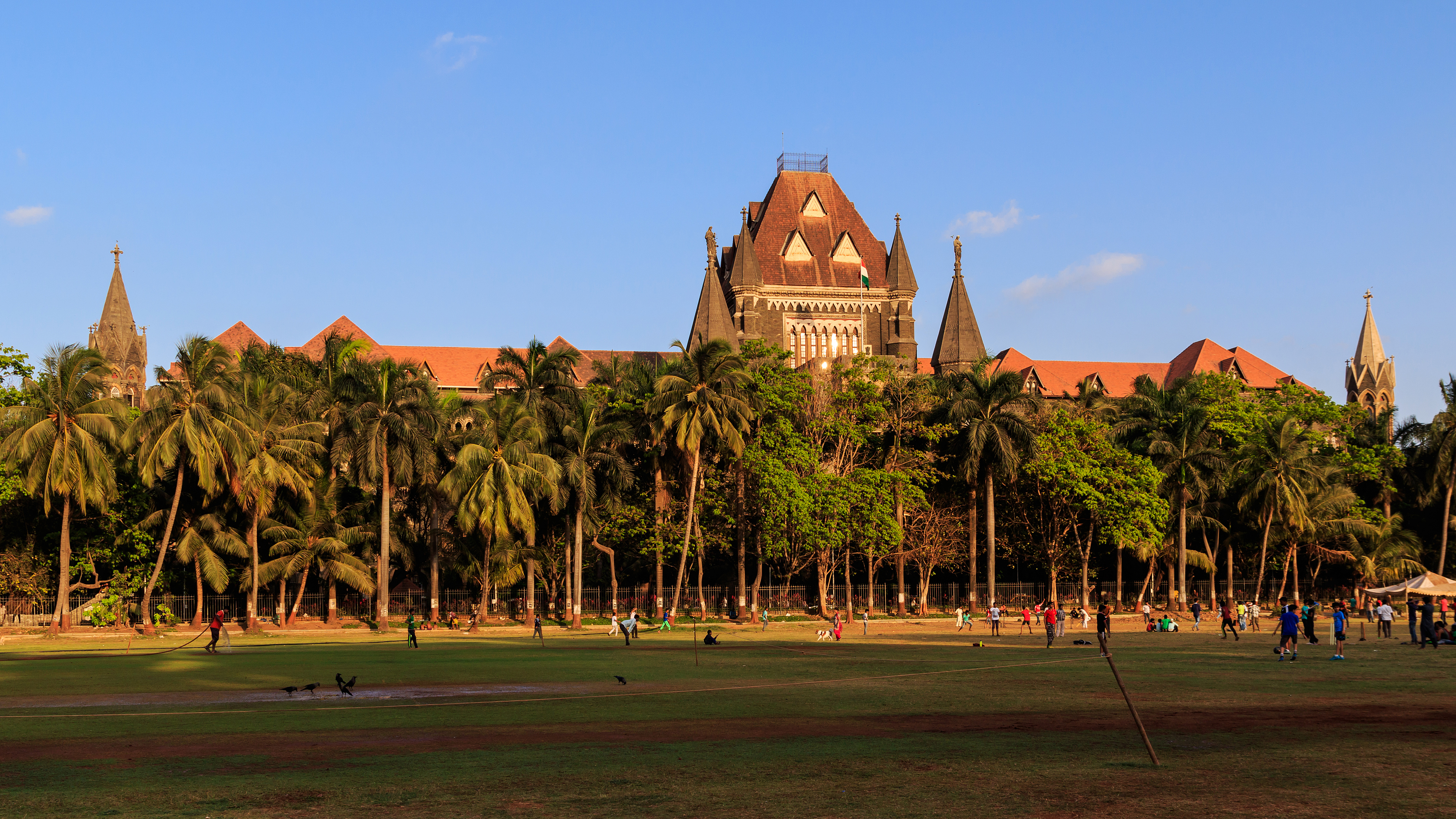
The Bombay High Court exercises jurisdiction over Maharashtra, Goa, Dadra and Nagar Haveli and Daman and Diu.

The Mumbai Police is headed by a police commissioner, who is an Indian Police Service officer. The Mumbai Police is a division of the Maharashtra Police, under the home ministry of the state government. The city is divided into seven police zones and seventeen traffic police zones, each headed by a deputy commissioner of police. The Mumbai Traffic Police is a semi-autonomous body under the Mumbai Police, and is responsible for traffic organisation in the city. The Mumbai Fire Brigade, which is under the jurisdiction of the municipal corporation, is headed by the chief fire officer, who is assisted by four deputy chief fire officers and six divisional officers. The Mumbai Metropolitan Region Development Authority is responsible for infrastructure development and planning of Mumbai Metropolitan Region.

Mumbai is the seat of the Bombay High Court, which exercises jurisdiction over the states of Maharashtra and Goa, and the Union Territory of Dadra and Nagar Haveli and Daman and Diu. Mumbai has two lower courts, the Court of Small Causes for civil matters, and the Sessions Court for criminal cases. Mumbai has a special Terrorist and Disruptive Activities court for people accused of conspiring and abetting acts of terrorism in the city.

=== Politics ===
First session of the Indian National Congress in Mumbai (28–31 December 1885)

The founding session of the Indian National Congress (INC) was held in Mumbai in December 1885. Its first session was held in Mumbai from 28 to 31 December 1885. The city played host to the sessions of the INC six times during its first 50 years, and was a base for the Indian independence movement during the 20th century.

The 1960s saw the rise of regionalist politics, and the Shiv Sena was formed on 19 June 1966 by Bal Thackeray out of resentment about the marginalisation of Marathi people in Mumbai. Shiv Sena switched from the 'Marathi cause' to a Hindutva plank in 1985 and joined hands with Bhartiya Janata Party (BJP) that year. The Congress had dominated the politics of Mumbai from the Indian independence until the early 1980s, when the Shiv Sena won the 1985 municipal elections for the first time.

In 1989, the BJP forged an electoral alliance with the Shiv Sena to dislodge the Congress in the Maharashtra Legislative Assembly elections. In 1999, several members left the Congress to form the Nationalist Congress Party (NCP) but later allied with the Congress to form the Democratic Front. Other parties such as Maharashtra Navnirman Sena, Samajwadi Party, Bahujan Samaj Party, All India Majlis-e-Ittehadul Muslimeen have contested and won seats in the local body elections in the city.

In the Indian national elections held every five years, Mumbai is represented by six parliamentary constituencies: North, North West, North East, North Central, South Central, and South. A member of parliament to the Lok Sabha, the lower house of the Indian Parliament, is elected from each of the parliamentary constituencies. In the 2019 national election, all six parliamentary constituencies were won by the BJP and Shiv Sena in alliance, each winning three seats.

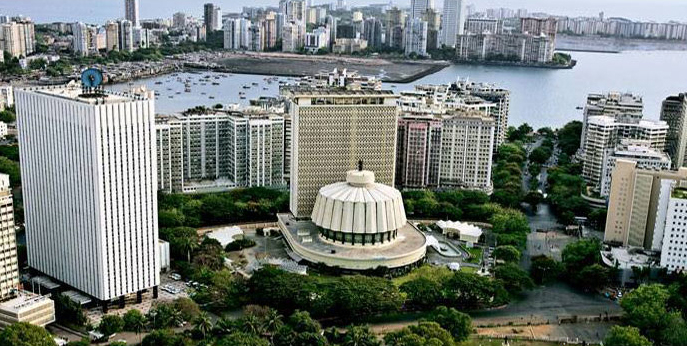
Maharashtra Legislative Assembly

In the Maharashtra state assembly elections held every five years, Mumbai is represented by 36 assembly constituencies. A member of the legislative assembly to the Maharashtra Vidhan Sabha (legislative assembly) is elected from each of the assembly constituencies. In the 2024 state assembly election, out of the 36 constituencies, 15 were won by the BJP, 10 by Shiv Sena (UBT), six by the Shiv Sena, three by the Congress, and one each by the NCP and an independent.

Elections are held every five years to elect the corporators of the BMC. The Corporation comprises 227 directly elected Councillors representing the 24 municipal wards, five nominated Councillors with knowledge of municipal administration, and a ceremonial mayor. In the 2026 municipal corporation elections, out of the 227 seats, the BJP-Shiv Sena alliance secured 118 seats, with the BJP winning 89 seats.

== Transport ==
=== Road ===
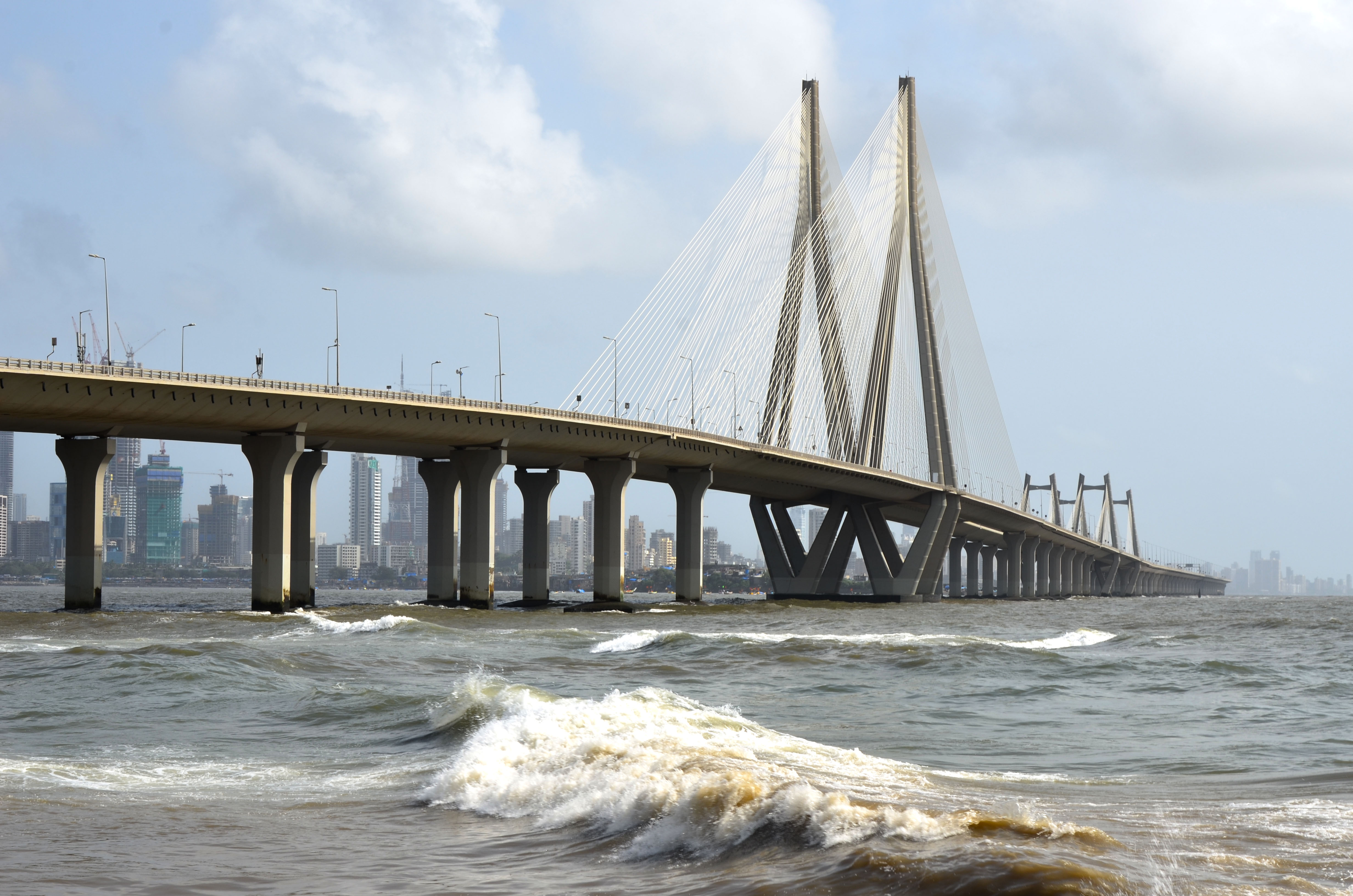
The Bandra-Worli Sea Link is amongst the longest sea bridges in India

Mumbai is one of the four termini of the Golden Quadrilateral highway system. The city is connected to Chennai and Delhi by National Highway 48. The highways NH-61 and NH-66 originate in the outskirts of the city. The Mumbai–Pune Expressway opened in 2000, and was the first expressway in India. The Mumbai–Nagpur Expressway opened in June 2025. The Delhi–Mumbai Expressway, is under construction from 2019, and is planned to be completed by 2027. In 2022, the state government proposed the Konkan Expressway, traversing along the Konkan coast.

Mumbai has approximately 1,900 km (1,200 mi) of public roads. The Eastern Freeway, which connects South Mumbai with Thane, opened in 2013. The Sion Panvel Expressway from Sion to Panvel and the Western Express Highway from Bandra to Bhayander, are the other major arterial roads in the city. The Bandra-Worli Sea Link bridge, along with Mahim Causeway, links South Mumbai to the city's western suburbs. The 21.8 km (13.5 mi) long Mumbai Trans Harbour Link was inaugurated on 12 January 2024, and connects Mumbai with Navi Mumbai. There are five tolled entry points to the city by road.

Mumbai's transport system is one of the most congested in the world. As of March 2014, Mumbai had about 721,000 private vehicles. Black-and-yellow meter taxis, and auto rickshaws serve are available for hire. Auto rickshaws are allowed to operate only in suburban areas, while taxis are allowed to operate throughout the city, but work mostly in the City district. Taxis and the lower-cost auto rickshaws are legally required to run on compressed natural gas. As of 2005, there were 56,459 black and yellow taxis and 106,000 auto rickshaws, as of May 2013. Ride hailing services Ola, Rapido, and Uber operate in the city.

==== Bus ====
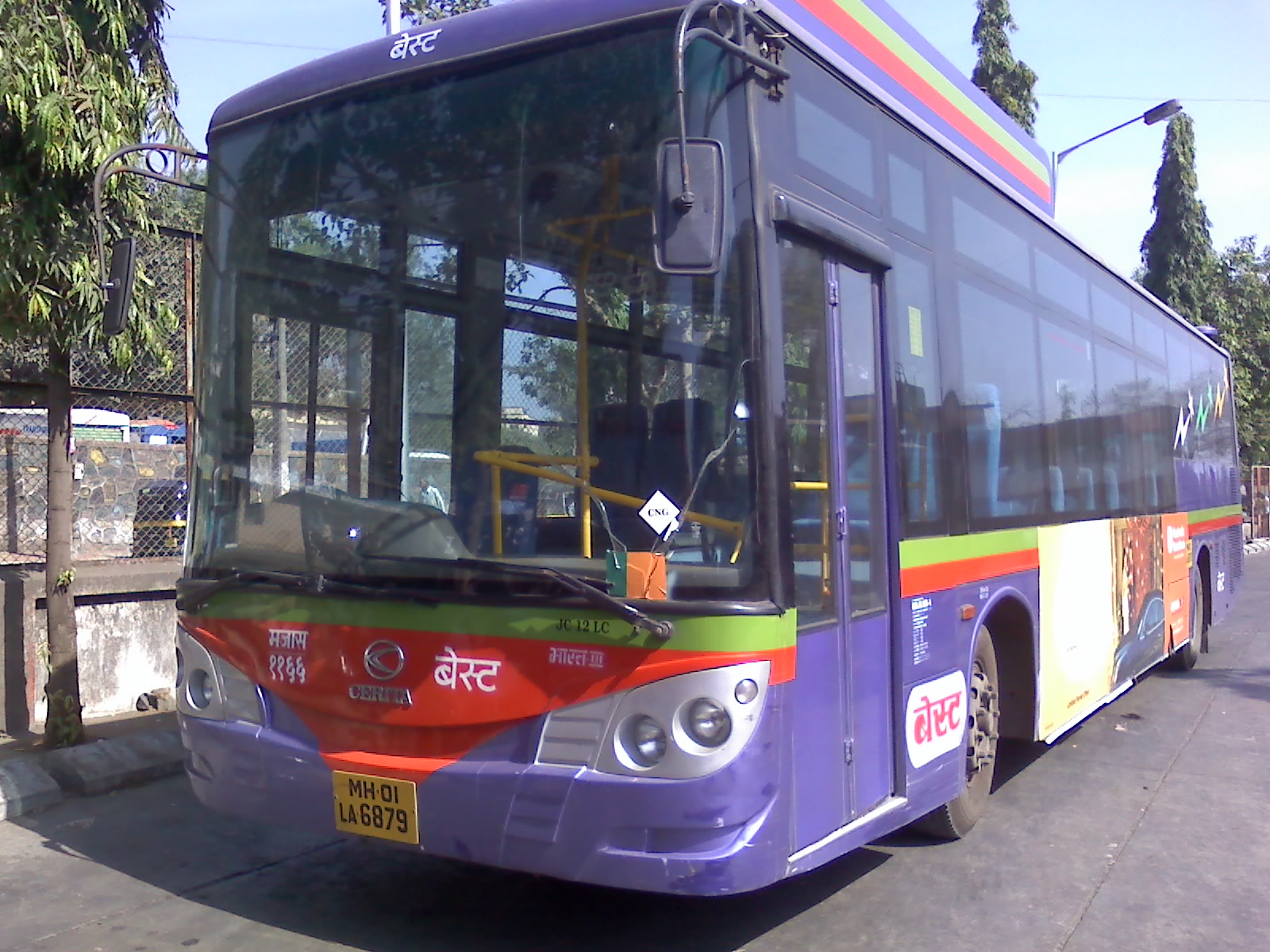
A public bus run by Brihanmumbai Electric Supply and Transport

The public bus transport system is operated by Brihanmumbai Electric Supply and Transport (BEST). Buses carried over 5.5 million passengers per day in 2008, and the BEST bus services together with the Mumbai's local rail network accounted for about 88% of the passenger traffic. The bus ridership dropped to 2.8 million in 2015. Buses are favoured for commuting short to medium distances. Public buses cover the entire city, and extend to parts of Mira-Bhayandar, Navi Mumbai, and Thane.

In 2011, the BEST operated 4,608 buses along 390 routes. The fleet consists of single-decker, double-decker, vestibule, low-floor, and air-conditioned buses, and run on diesel, compressed natural gas, or electric power. The earlier BEST buses were red, and based on London's Routemaster buses. BEST introduced air-conditioned buses in 1998.

Maharashtra State Road Transport Corporation buses provide intercity transport connecting Mumbai with other cities of Maharashtra and nearby states. The Navi Mumbai Municipal Transport and Thane Municipal Transport operate buses in Mumbai, connecting Navi Mumbai and Thane to parts of Mumbai. The Mumbai Darshan tourist bus service covers the various tourist attractions in the city. Bus Rapid Transit System lanes have been planned throughout Mumbai.

=== Rail ===
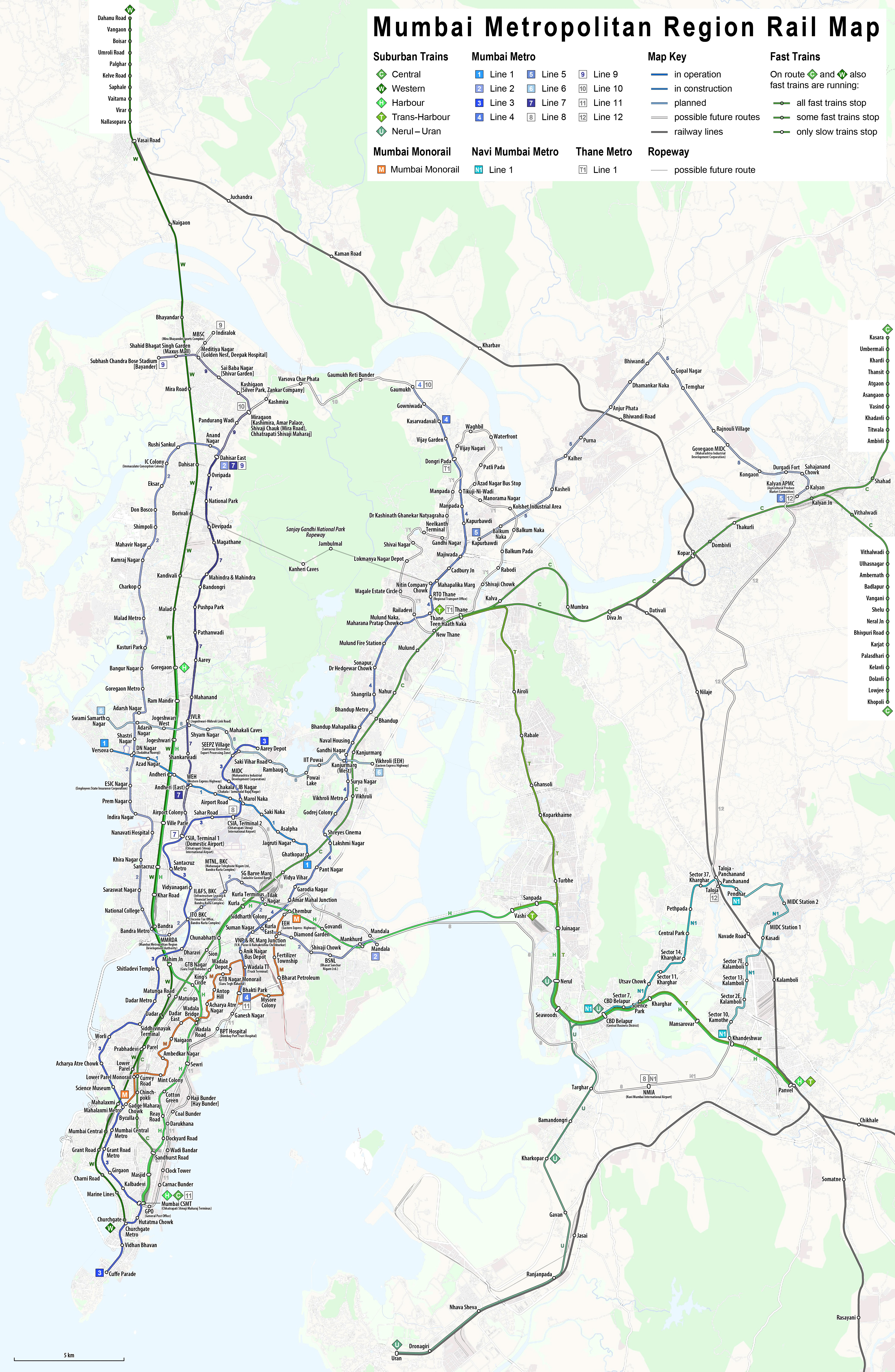
Rail map of Mumbai

The Mumbai Suburban Railway, colloquially referred to as "locals", forms the backbone of the city's transport system. It is operated by the Central and Western Railway zones of the Indian Railways. Mumbai's suburban rail systems carried 6.3 million passengers per day in 2007. The suburban rail network spans 319 km (198 mi), and 2,226 train services operated daily in 2010. The trains are often overcrowded during peak hours, with twelve-car trains with a rated capacity 1,700 passengers, carrying nearly 4,500 passengers.

The Mumbai Monorail and Mumbai Metro were inaugurated to relieve the overcrowding on the existing rail network. The Monorail operates on a single route and opened in early February 2014. The first line of the Mumbai Metro opened in June 2014. After that, many lines of Mumbai Metro have started operating partially or fully.

Mumbai is the headquarters of two zones of the Indian Railways: the Central Railway headquartered at Chhatrapati Shivaji Terminus, and the Western Railway headquartered at Churchgate. Mumbai is well connected with major stations across the Indian Railways network. Long-distance trains operate from Chhatrapati Shivaji Terminus, Dadar, Lokmanya Tilak Terminus, Mumbai Central, and Bandra Terminus railway stations. As of 2026, four lines of the metro are operational and eight are planned.

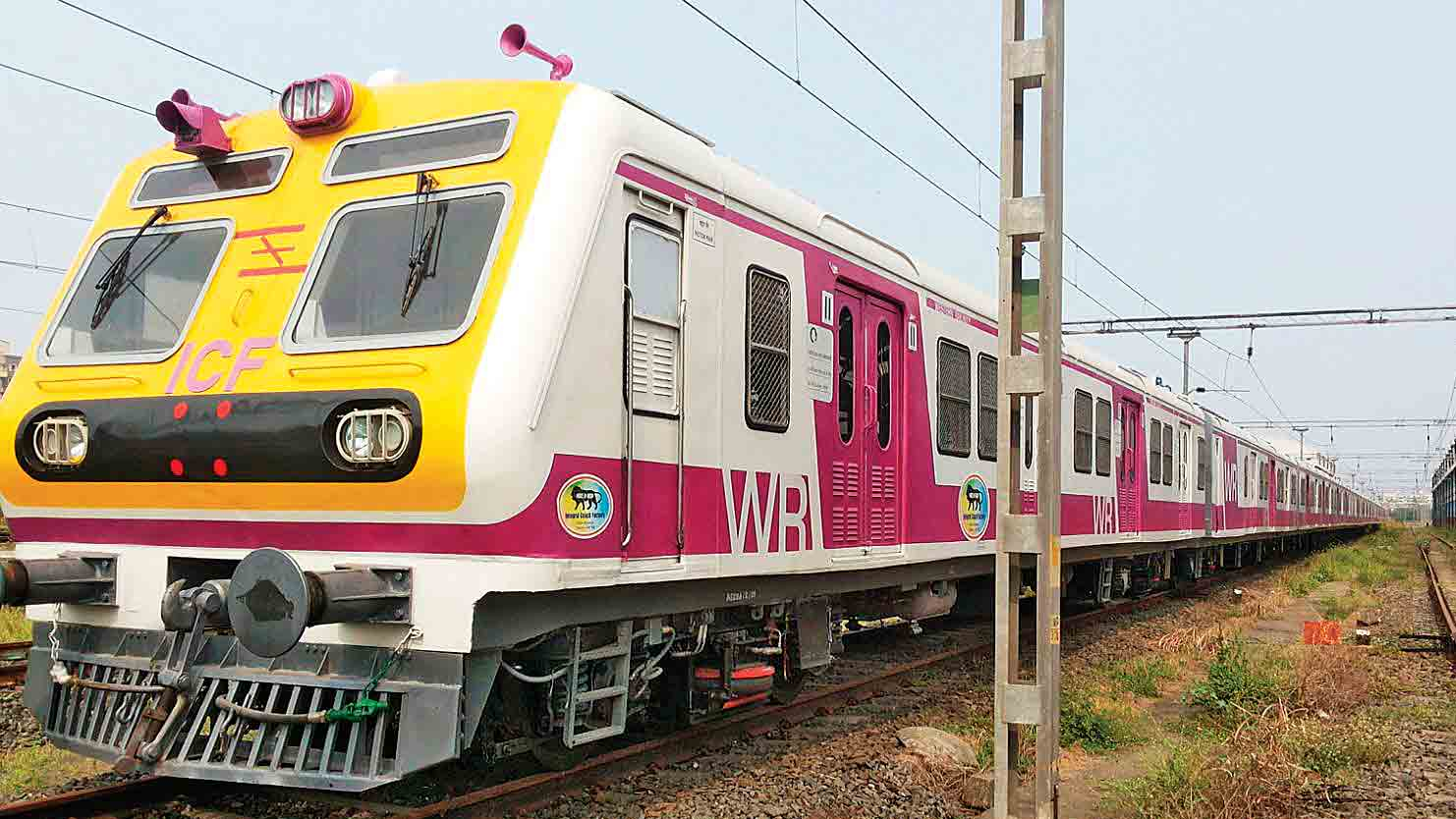
A Mumbai Suburban Railway train

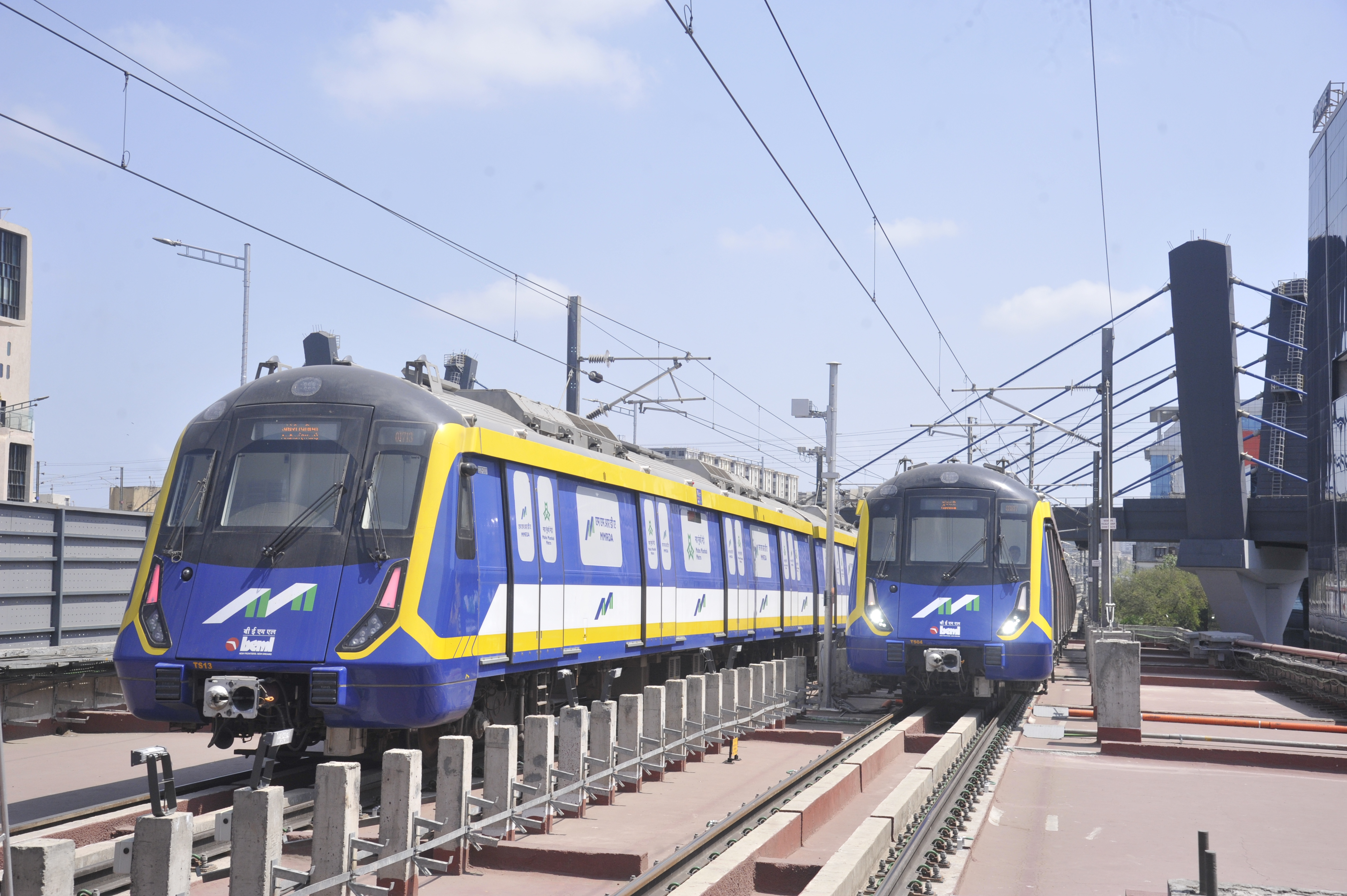
Mumbai Metro was opened in 2014

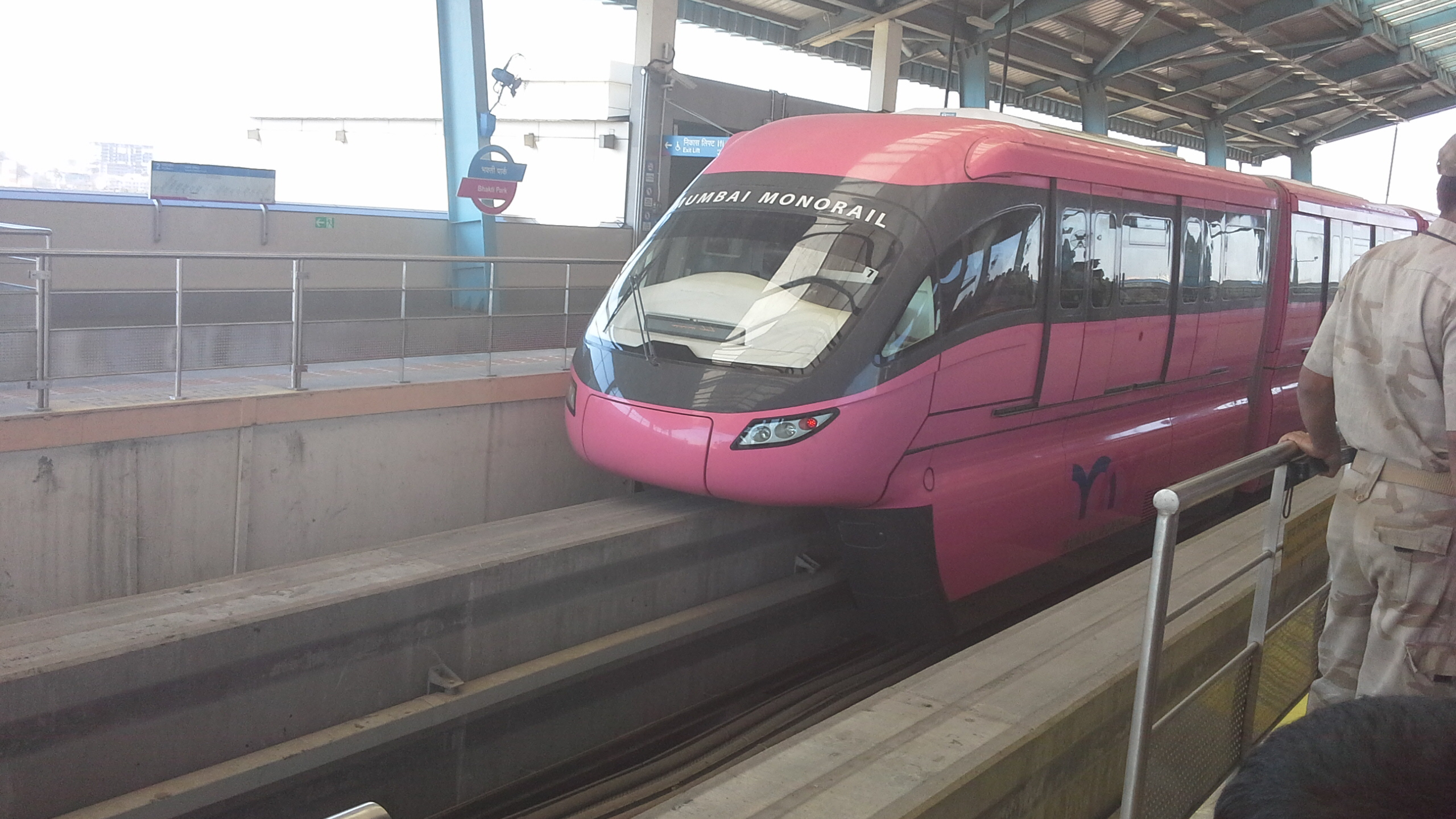
Mumbai Monorail operates a single line

=== Air ===
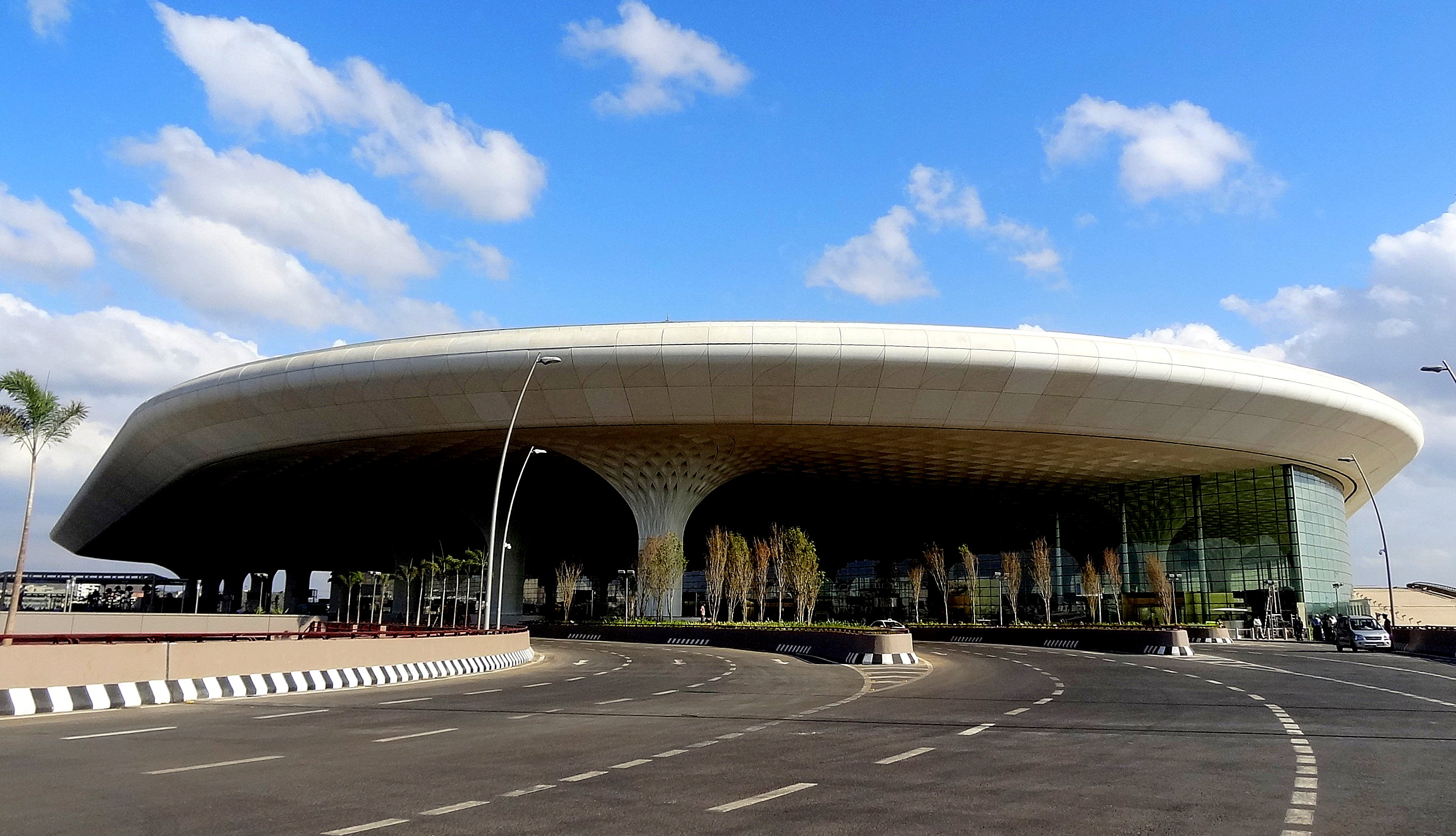
Chhatrapati Shivaji Maharaj International Airport is the second busiest airport in India

The Chhatrapati Shivaji Maharaj International Airport is the main aviation hub in the city. It handled 52.8 million passengers in 2023–24, and is the second busiest airport in India in terms of passenger traffic. A modernisation and upgrade plan was initiated in 2006, targeted at increasing the capacity of the airport to handle up to 40 million passengers annually, and the new T2 terminal was opened in February 2014.

The Navi Mumbai International airport, built in the Ulwe suburb in Raigad district, opened in December 2025, and serves as the second international airport in the metropolitan region. The Juhu Aerodrome hosts the Bombay Flying Club, a heliport operated by state-owned Pawan Hans, and handles private flights.

=== Water ===
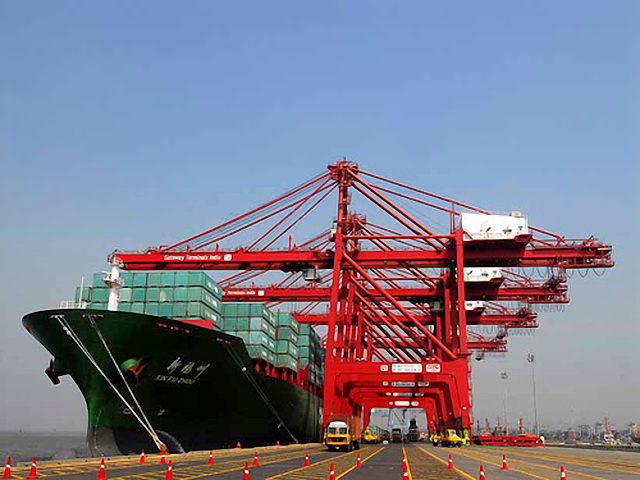
Jawaharlal Nehru Port is the busiest port in India

Mumbai is served by two major ports, Mumbai Port and Jawaharlal Nehru Port, which lies just across the creek in Navi Mumbai. Mumbai Port is a natural harbour, and has extensive wet and dry dock accommodation facilities. Jawaharlal Nehru Port, commissioned on 26 May 1989, is the busiest major port in India, and handles around 50% of the country's total containerised cargo.

Local water transport in Mumbai consists of ferries, small boats, and catamarans. Ferry services are operated by government agencies and private partners. Hovercraft services plied briefly in the late 1990s between the Gateway of India and CBD Belapur in Navi Mumbai, and were scrapped due to lack of adequate infrastructure and opposition from the local fishermen. Ferries from Ferry Wharf in Mazagaon allow access to islands near the city.

The city is also the headquarters of the Western Naval Command, and an important base for the Indian Navy.

== Utility services ==
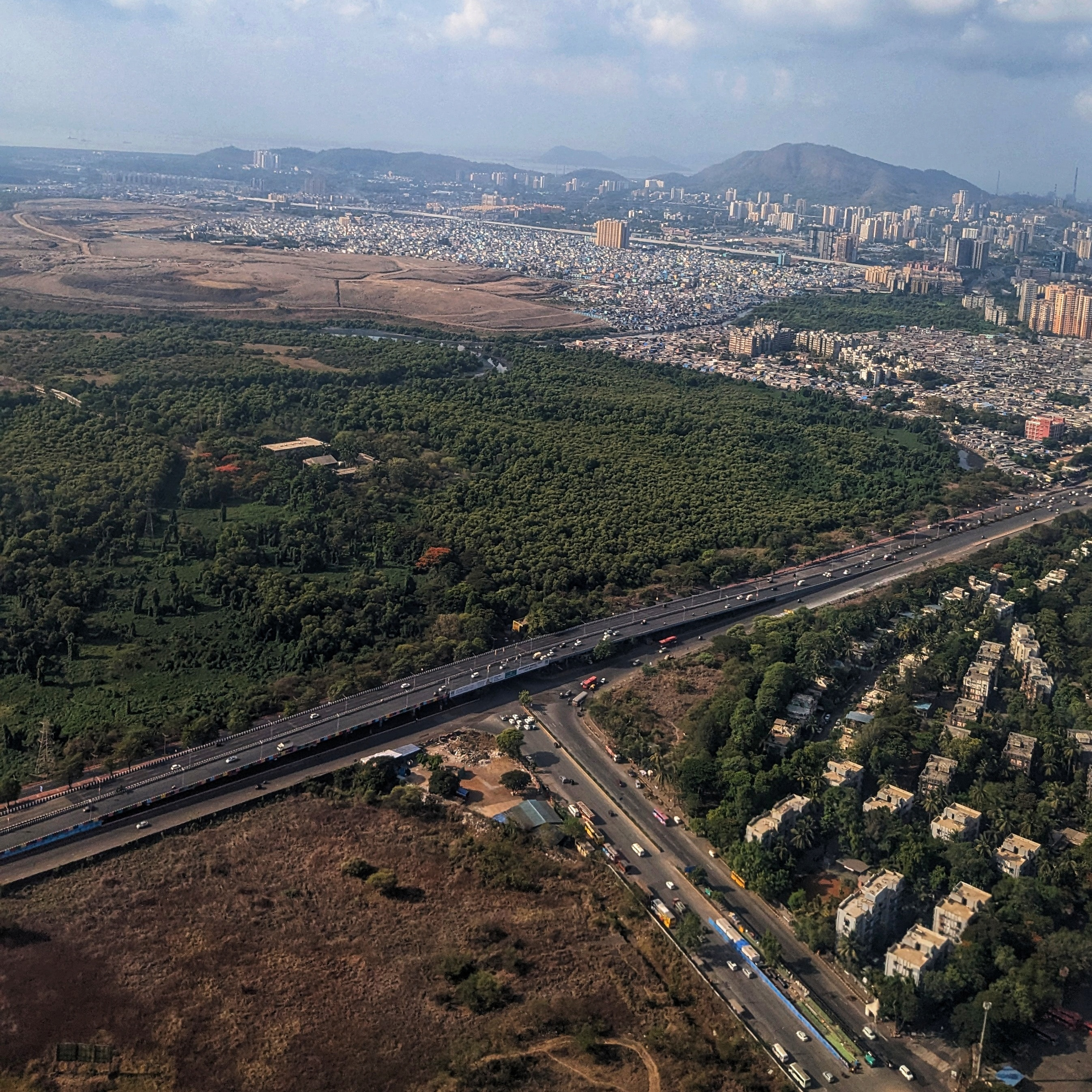
Deonar dumping ground along the Eastern Express Highway

The municipal corporation supplies potable water to the city drawn from six lakes and water bodies in and around the city. The Tansa lake supplies water to the western suburbs and parts of the City district. The water drawn from the lake is filtered at Bhandup, which has Asia's largest water filtration plant. The water is supplied to the filtering facility using underground water tunnels. In 2009, the city required a daily supply of 3.5 billion litres of water, of which 700 million litres is lost by way of water thefts, illegal connections and leakages.

In 2005, the city generated a refuse of 7,800 t (7,700 long tons; 8,600 short tons), of which 40 t (39 long tons; 44 short tons) is plastic waste, and is transported to dumping grounds in Gorai in the northwest, Mulund in the northeast, and to the Deonar in the east. Sewage treatment is carried out at Worli and Bandra, and disposed of by two independent marine outfalls of 3.4 km (2.1 mi) and 3.7 km (2.3 mi) at Bandra and Worli respectively.

Electricity is distributed by BEST in the City district, and by Maharashtra State Electricity Distribution Company (Mahavitaran), Adani Transmission, and Tata Power in the suburbs. Majority of the power supply cables are underground, to reduce pilferage, thefts and other losses. Cooking gas is supplied in the form of Liquefied petroleum gas cylinders sold by various state-owned oil companies, and pieped natural gas supplied by Mahanagar Gas Limited.

The state-owned MTNL, which held a monopoly over fixed line and cellular services up until 2000, and provides fixed line as well as mobile WLL services. Mobile phone coverage is extensive, and the main service providers include Bharti Airtel, Reliance Jio, MTNL, and Vodafone Idea. Mumbai, along with the area served by telephone exchanges in Navi Mumbai and Kalyan is classified as a metro telecom circle. Various operators provide broadband internet and wireless internet access, and as of 2014, Mumbai had the highest number of internet users in India with 16.4 million users.

== Education ==
=== Schools ===
Schools in Mumbai include municipal schools run by the municipal corporation, government aided, and private schools. The schools usually use Marathi or English as the primary language of instruction. As of 2026, the BMC operated 1,135 schools which provided free education to nearly 293,000 students. The schools taught in eight languages (Marathi, Hindu, Gujarati, Urdu, English, Tamil, Telugu and Kannada).

=== Higher education ===
Under the 10+2+3 plan, students complete ten years of schooling and then two years in junior college, where they select one of three streams: arts, commerce, or science. This is followed by either a degree course in any of three disciplines, or a professional degree course, such as engineering, law, and medicine.

Most colleges are affiliated with the University of Mumbai, established in 1857, and is one of the premier universities in India. It was ranked 41 among the top 50 engineering schools by Business Insider in 2012, fifth in the list of best universities in India by India Today in 2013, and 10th among the top Universities of India in 2013 in the QS World University Rankings. The Wilson College was the first college in the city, established in 1832. The Grant Government Medical College was opened in 1845, the Government Law College in 1855, and Elphinstone College in 1856. The Veermata Jijabai Technological Institute, was the first engineering institute, opened in 1887.

The Indian Institute of Technology Bombay, and Institute of Chemical Technology are amongst the major engineering schools in the city. Mumbai is home to several prominent business schools including IIM Mumbai, Jamnalal Bajaj Institute of Management Studies, Narsee Monjee Institute of Management Studies, S P Jain Institute of Management and Research, and Tata Institute of Social Sciences. The Sir J. J. School of Art is Mumbai's oldest art institution. The city is home to the Tata Institute of Fundamental Research, and the Bhabha Atomic Research Centre, which operates CIRUS nuclear research reactor in Trombay.

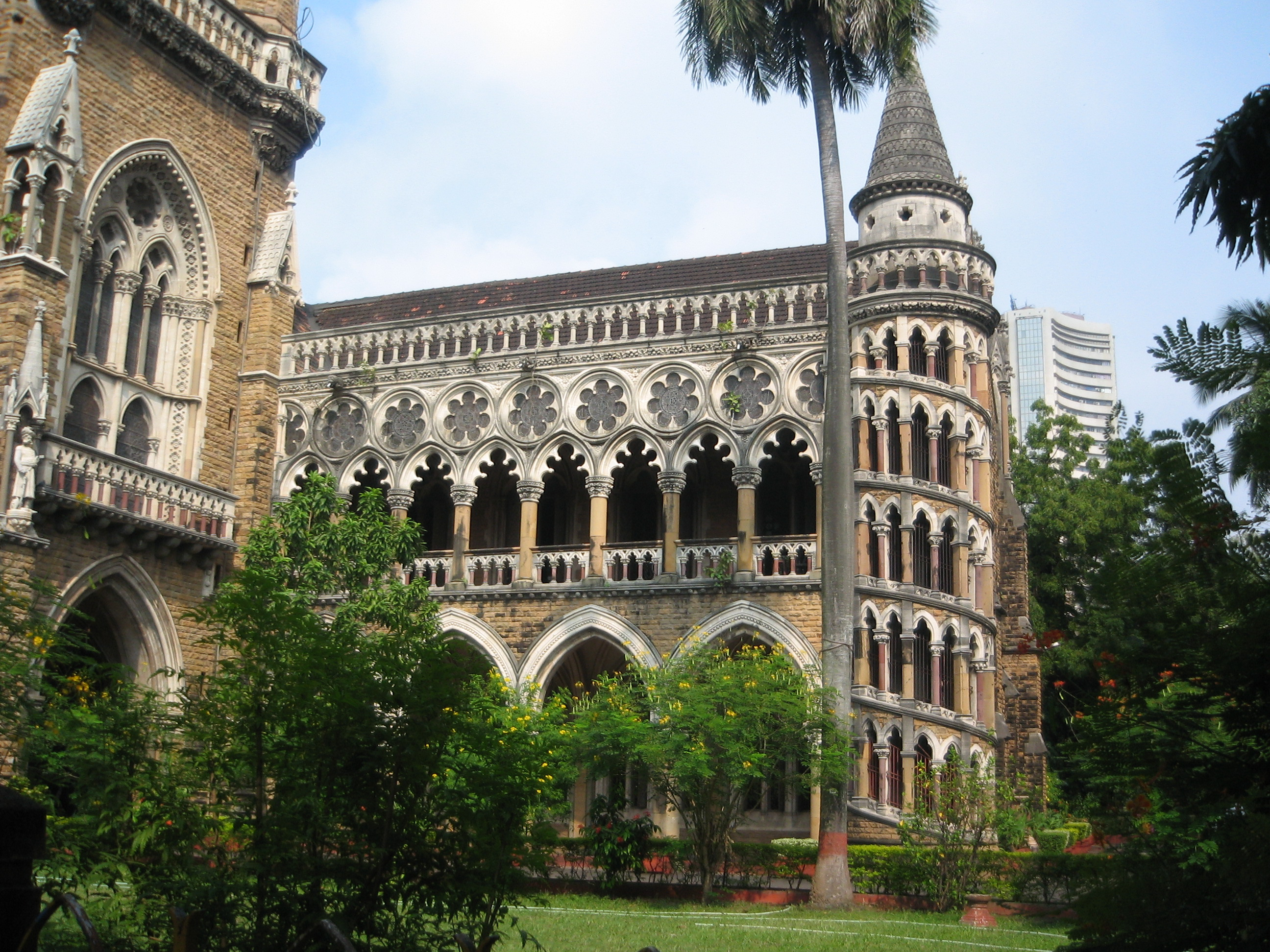
University of Mumbai

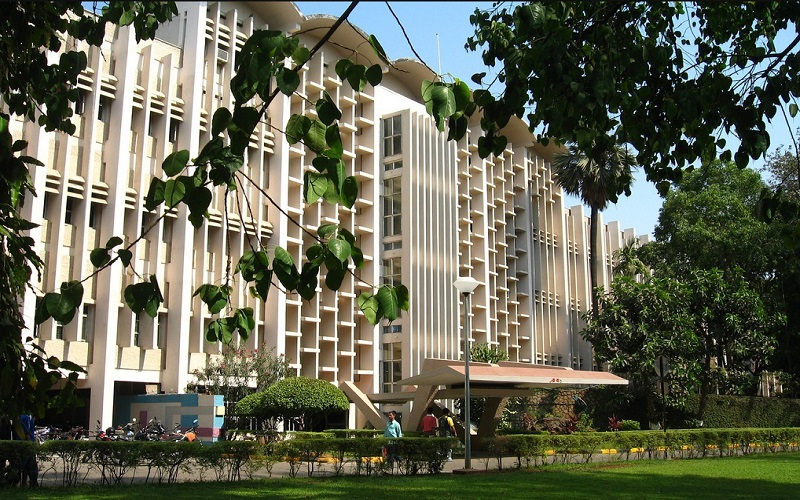
IIT Bombay

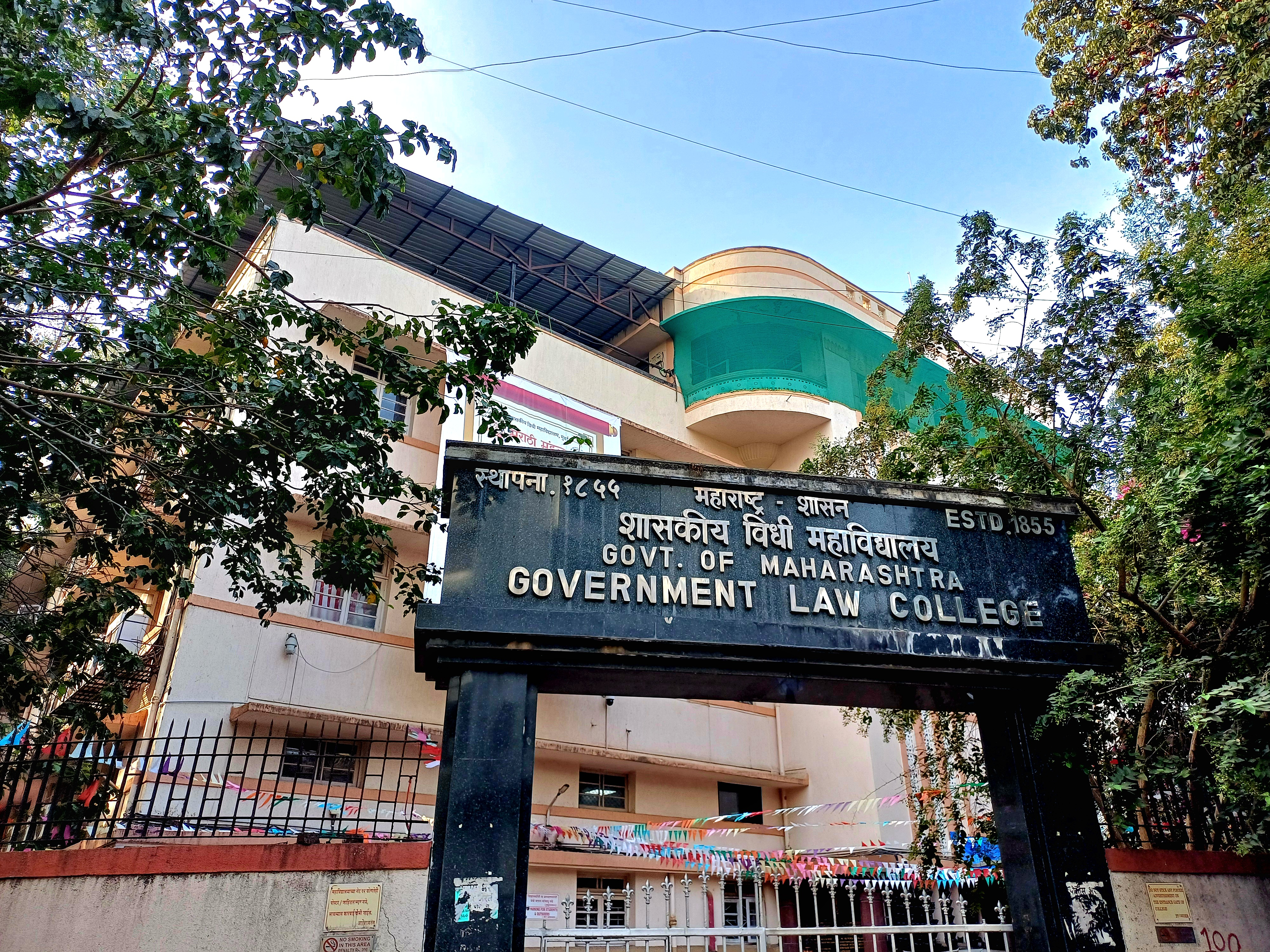
Government Law College

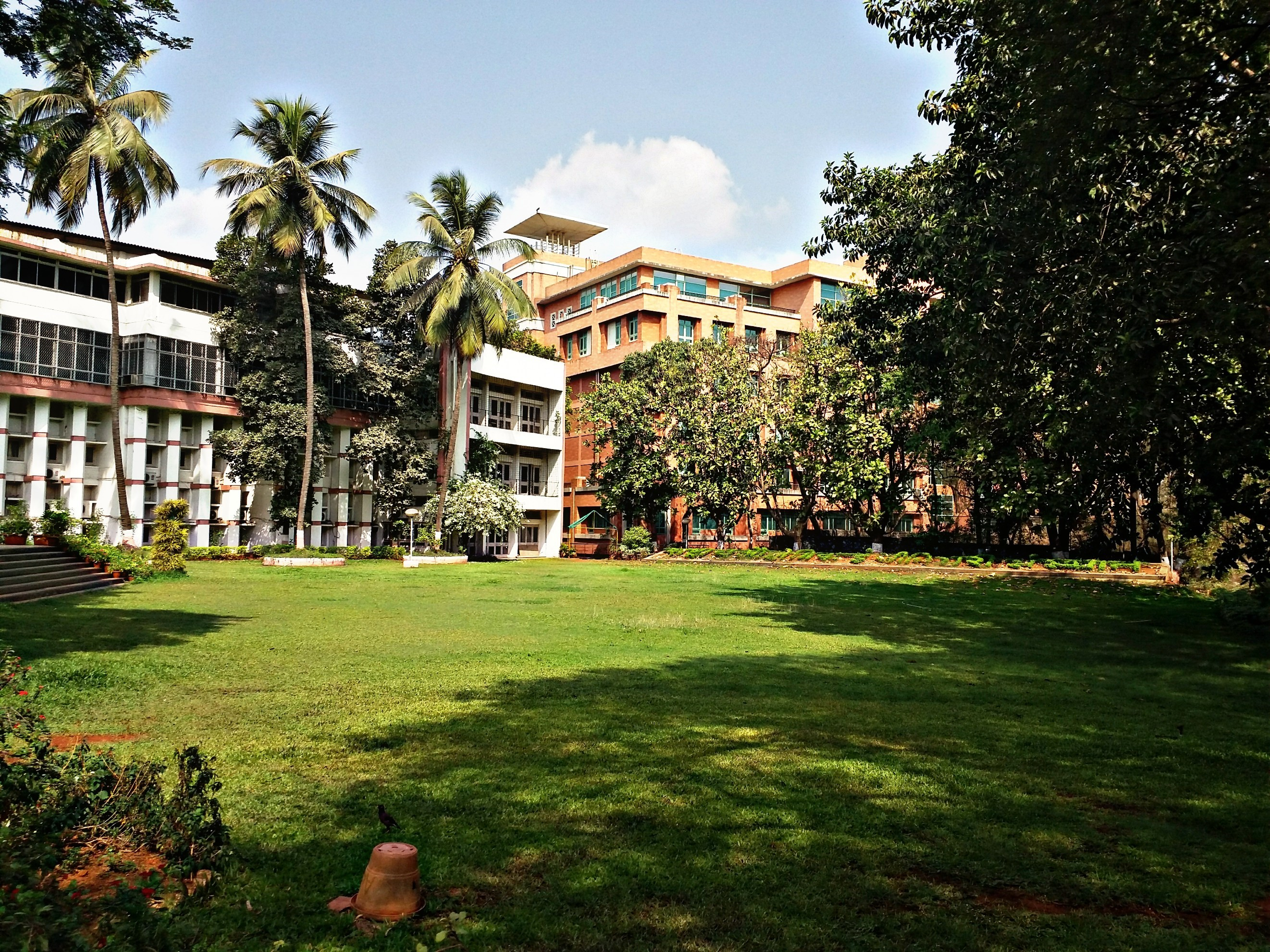
IIM Mumbai

== Culture ==
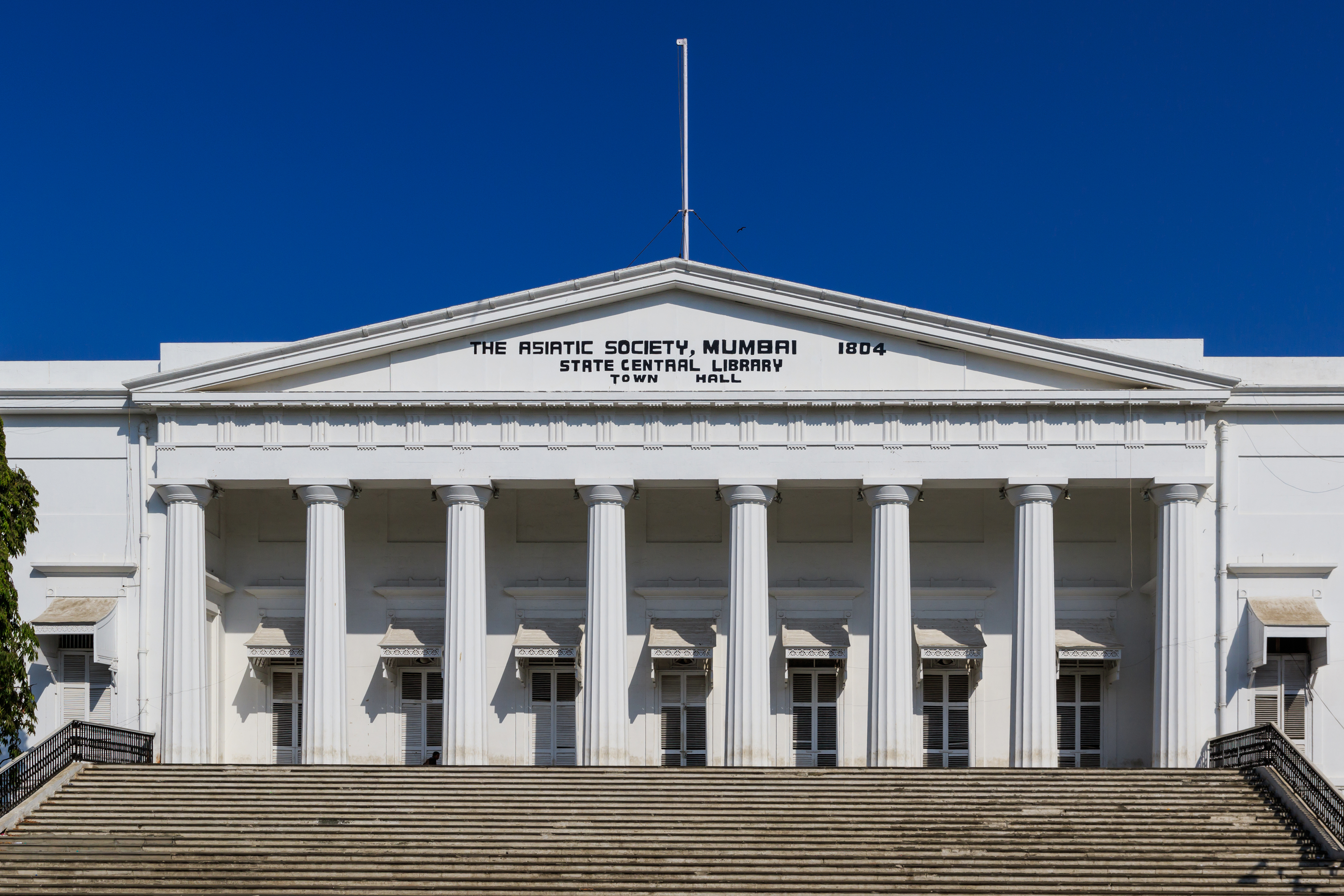
The Asiatic Society of Mumbai is one of the oldest public libraries in the city.

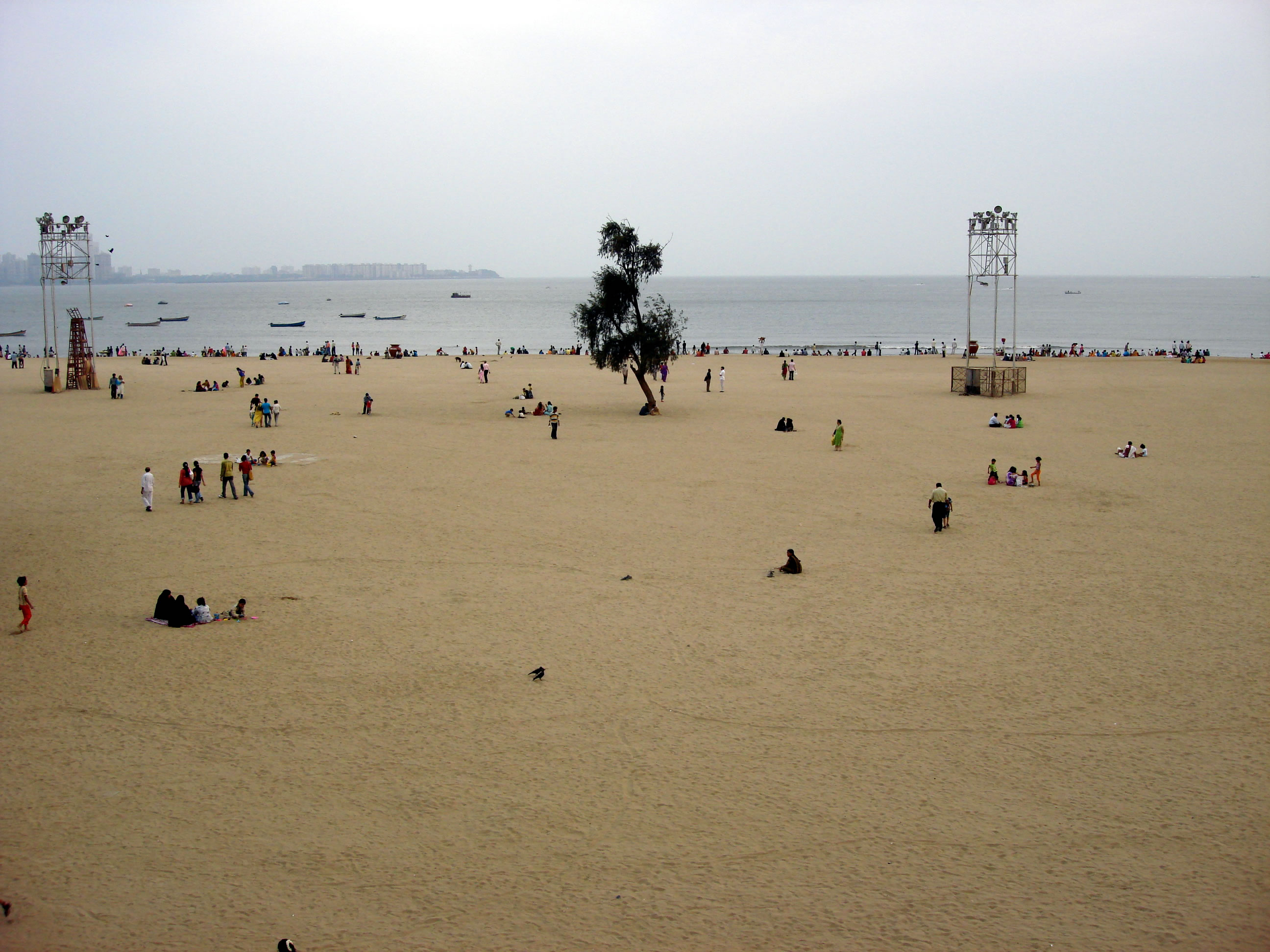
Girgaum Chowpatty beach. Beaches are a popular tourist attraction in the city.

Mumbai's culture offers a blend of traditional and cosmopolitan festivals, food, entertainment, and night life. Many cultures, religions, and cuisines coexist in the city, producing varied restaurants, cinemas, theatres, sports events and museums.

Mumbai is the birthplace of Indian cinema. It has many cinemas that feature Bollywood, Marathi and Hollywood movies. The Mumbai International Film Festival and the award ceremony of the Filmfare Awards, the oldest and prominent film awards given for Hindi film industry in India, are held in Mumbai. Despite most of the professional theatre groups that formed during the British Raj having disbanded by the 1950s, Mumbai has developed a thriving "theatre movement" tradition in Marathi, Hindi, English, and other regional languages.

Contemporary art is featured in both government-funded art spaces and private commercial galleries. The government-funded institutions include the Jehangir Art Gallery and the National Gallery of Modern Art. Built in 1833, the Asiatic Society of Mumbai is one of the oldest public libraries in the city. The Chhatrapati Shivaji Maharaj Vastu Sangrahalaya (formerly The Prince of Wales Museum) is a renowned museum in South Mumbai which houses rare ancient exhibits of Indian history.

Mumbai has a zoo named Jijamata Udyaan (formerly Victoria Gardens), which also harbours a garden. The literary traditions of the city have been highlighted internationally by Booker Prize winners such as Salman Rushdie and Aravind Adiga. Marathi literature has been modernised in the works of Mumbai-based authors such as Mohan Apte, Anant Kanekar, and Gangadhar Gadgil, and is promoted through an annual Sahitya Akademi Award, a literary honour bestowed by India's National Academy of Letters.

Mumbai residents celebrate both Western and Indian festivals. Ganesh Chaturthi is the biggest and most important festival of Mumbai; there are almost 5000 Ganpati Pandals set up in the city for the celebrations. Other festivals like Diwali, Holi, Navratri, Christmas, Rakshabandhan, Makar Sankranti, Dussera, Eid, Durga Puja, Ram Navami, Shiv Jayanti and Maha Shivratri are some of the popular festivals in the city. The Kala Ghoda Arts Festival is an exhibition that encapsulates works of artists in the fields of music, dance, theatre and films.

The Banganga Festival is a two-day music festival, held annually in the month of January, which is organised by the Maharashtra Tourism Development Corporation (MTDC) at the historic Banganga Tank in Mumbai. According to a legend, it is associated with Rama and Lakshmana of the Sanskrit epic Ramayana. Similarly it is also linked to Parashurama in Hinduism. On the bank of the Banganga tank, there is a temple known as Parshuram Mandir dedicated to Parshuram.

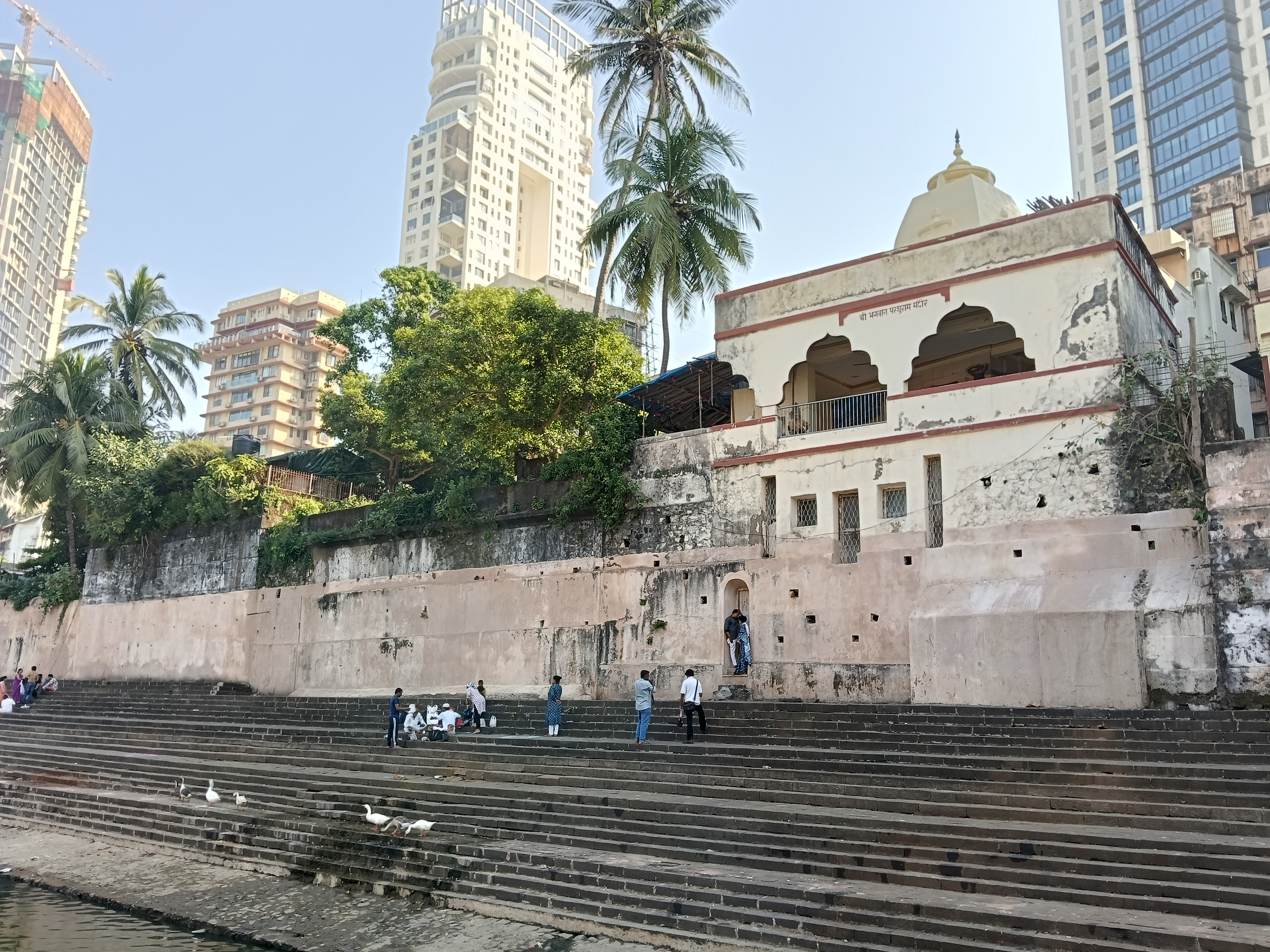
View of Parshuram Mandir from the Banganga tank in the Walkeshwar area of Malabar Hill in South Mumbai

The Elephanta Festival—celebrated every February on the Elephanta Islands—is dedicated to classical Indian dance and music and attracts performers from across the country. Public holidays specific to the city and the state include Maharashtra Day on 1 May, to celebrate the formation of Maharashtra state on 1 May 1960, and Gudi Padwa which is the New Year's Day for Marathi people.

Beaches are a major tourist attraction in the city. The major beaches in Mumbai are Girgaum Chowpatty, Juhu Beach, Dadar Chowpatty, Gorai Beach, Marve Beach, Versova Beach, Madh Beach, Aksa Beach and Manori Beach. Most of the beaches are unfit for swimming, except Girgaum Chowpatty and Juhu Beach. Essel World is a theme park and amusement centre situated close to Gorai Beach, and includes Asia's largest theme water park, Water Kingdom. Adlabs Imagica opened in April 2013 is located near the city of Khopoli off the Mumbai-Pune Expressway.

== Architecture ==
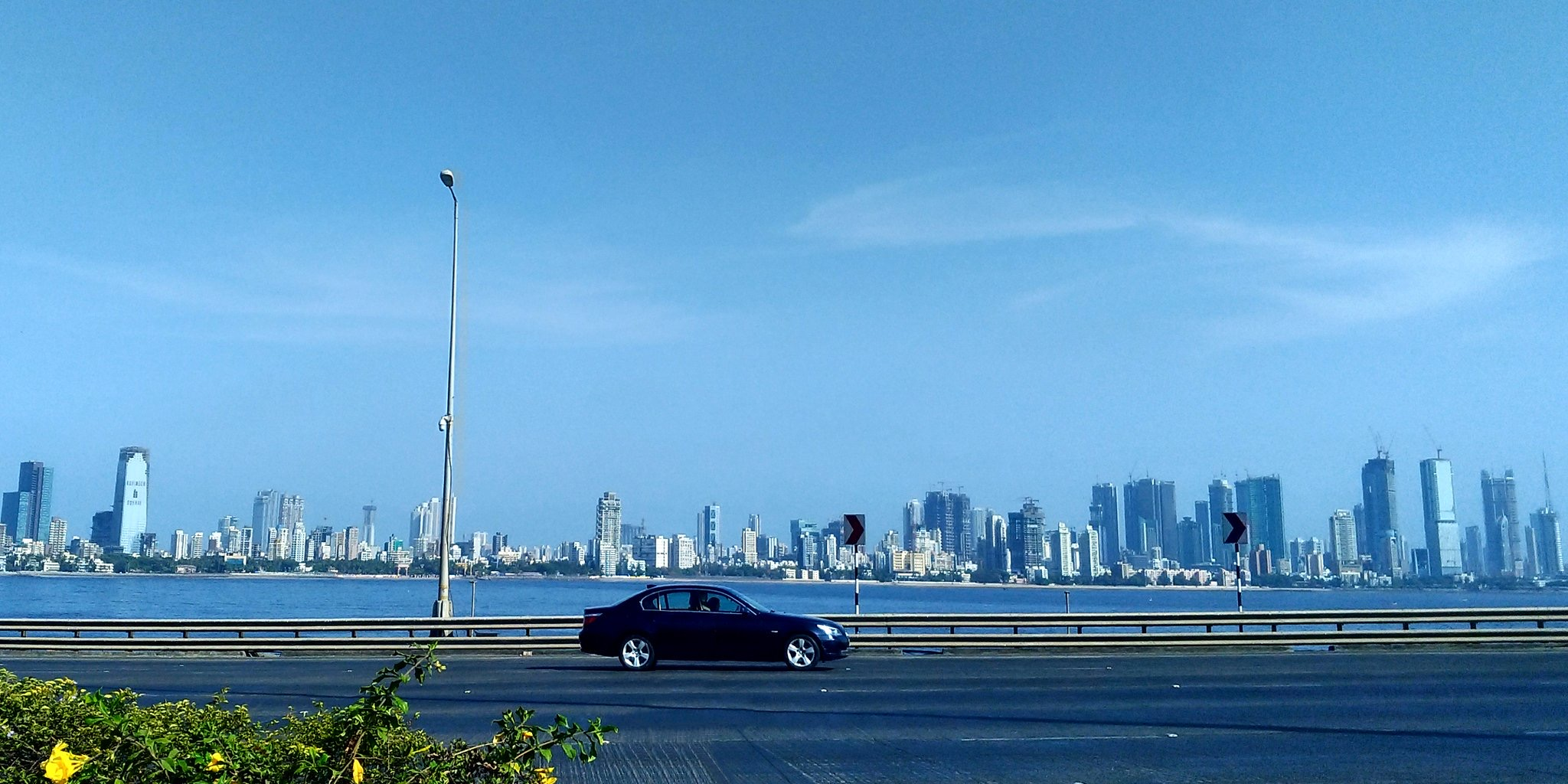
The skyline of Worli and Dadar viewed from Bandra

The architecture of the city is a blend of Gothic Revival, Indo-Saracenic, Art Deco, and other contemporary styles. Most of the buildings during the British period, such as the Victoria Terminus and University of Mumbai, were built in Gothic Revival style. Their architectural features include a variety of European influences such as German gables, Dutch roofs, Swiss timbering, Romance arches, Tudor casements, and traditional Indian features. There are also a few Indo-Saracenic styled buildings such as the Gateway of India. Art Deco styled landmarks can be found along Marine Drive and west of the Oval Maidan. Mumbai has the second highest number of Art Deco buildings in the world after Miami. In the newer suburbs, modern buildings dominate the landscape. Mumbai has by far the highest number of skyscrapers in India, with 247 existing skyscrapers and 200-300 under construction as of 2026.

The Mumbai Heritage Conservation Committee (MHCC), established in 1995, formulates special regulations and by-laws to assist in the conservation of the city's heritage structures. Mumbai has three UNESCO World Heritage Sites, the Chhatrapati Shivaji Terminus, the Elephanta Caves and the Victorian and Art Deco Ensemble. In the south of Mumbai, there are colonial-era buildings and Soviet-style offices. In the east are factories and some slums. On the West coast are former-textile mills being demolished and skyscrapers built on top. There are 237 buildings taller than 100 m (330 ft), compared with 327 in Shanghai and 855 in New York.

=== Cityscape ===
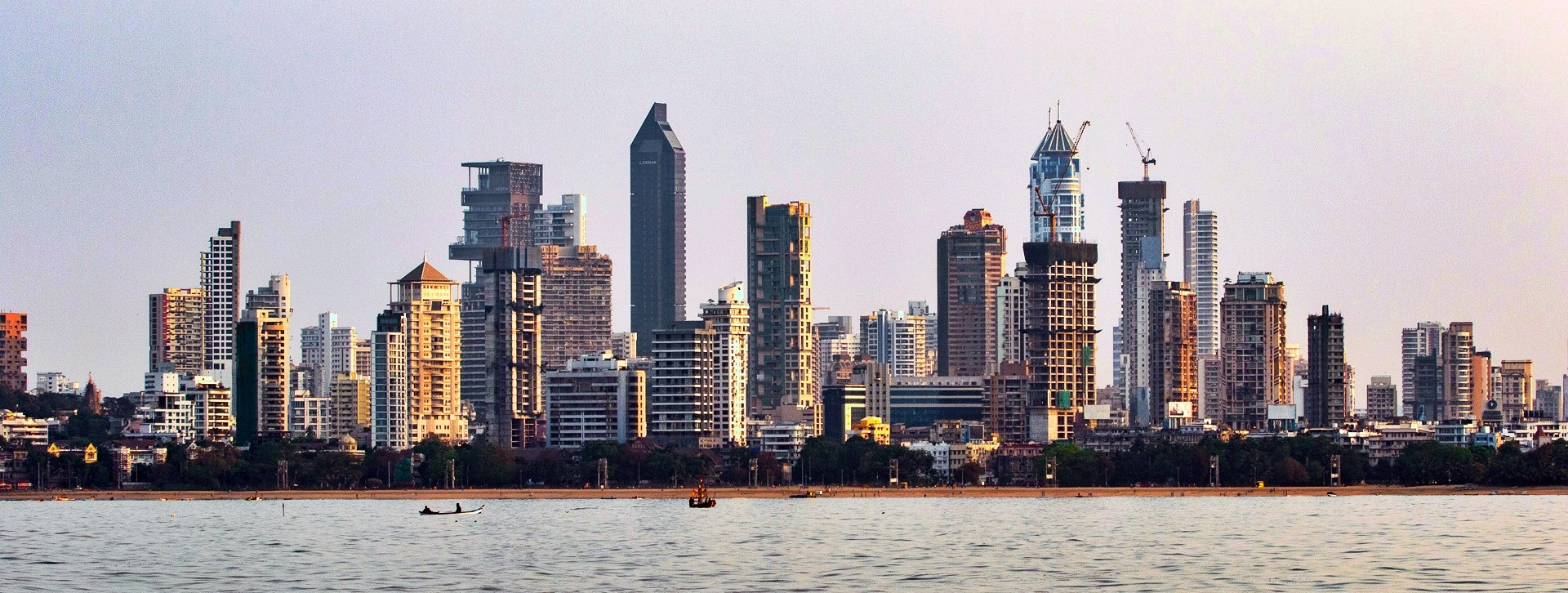
Skyline across Back Bay

Mumbai's cityscape consists of several tall buildings and structures, most of which were built in the 21st century. There was a lull in construction from the mid-1990s, after which construction projects began taking the skyline upwards, with a major acceleration since 2000, when the Lower Parel area began developing. Amongst the tall buildings, Mumbai has more residential buildings rather than commercial, and limited land resources and an exponential increase in urban population are the primary reasons for Mumbai's vertical growth compared to other Indian cities. As of 2023, about 77% of the tallest buildings in India are in Mumbai, and the city commands premium real estate prices compared to other cities in India. As of June 2023, Mumbai has a total of around 250 tall buildings out of which more than 100 are completed, and more than 90 were under construction.

== Food ==
Street food of Mumbai is the food sold by hawkers from portable market stalls in Mumbai. Although street food is common all over India, Mumbai is known for its street food and is a strong characteristic of the city. It has this reputation because people from all economic classes eat on the roadside almost round the clock, and it is sometimes felt that the taste of street food is better than that of restaurants in the city. Street food vendors are credited by some for developing the city's food culture. Street food is relatively inexpensive as compared to restaurants, and vendors tend to be clustered around crowded areas such as colleges and railway stations. Mumbai's street food ranked No.10 in the Time Out's World's Best Street Food Cities 2026 list. Mumbai was amongst 3 Indian cities which made it to the list, the other two being Jaipur at No.15 and Delhi at No. 19.

== Media ==
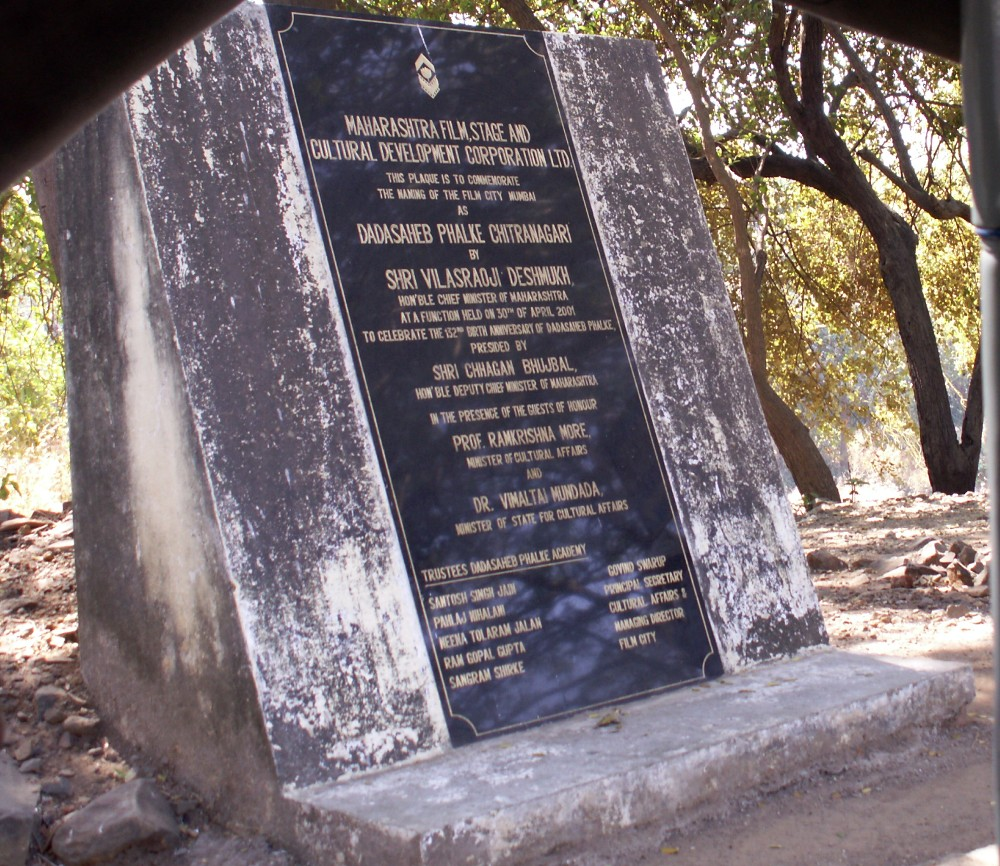
Plaque at Film City entrance

Bollywood, the Hindi film industry based in Mumbai, produces around 150–200 films every year. The name Bollywood is a blend of Bombay and Hollywood. The 2000s saw a growth in Bollywood's popularity overseas. This led filmmaking to new heights in terms of quality, cinematography and innovative story lines as well as technical advances such as special effects and animation. Studios in Goregaon, including Film City, are the location for most movie sets.

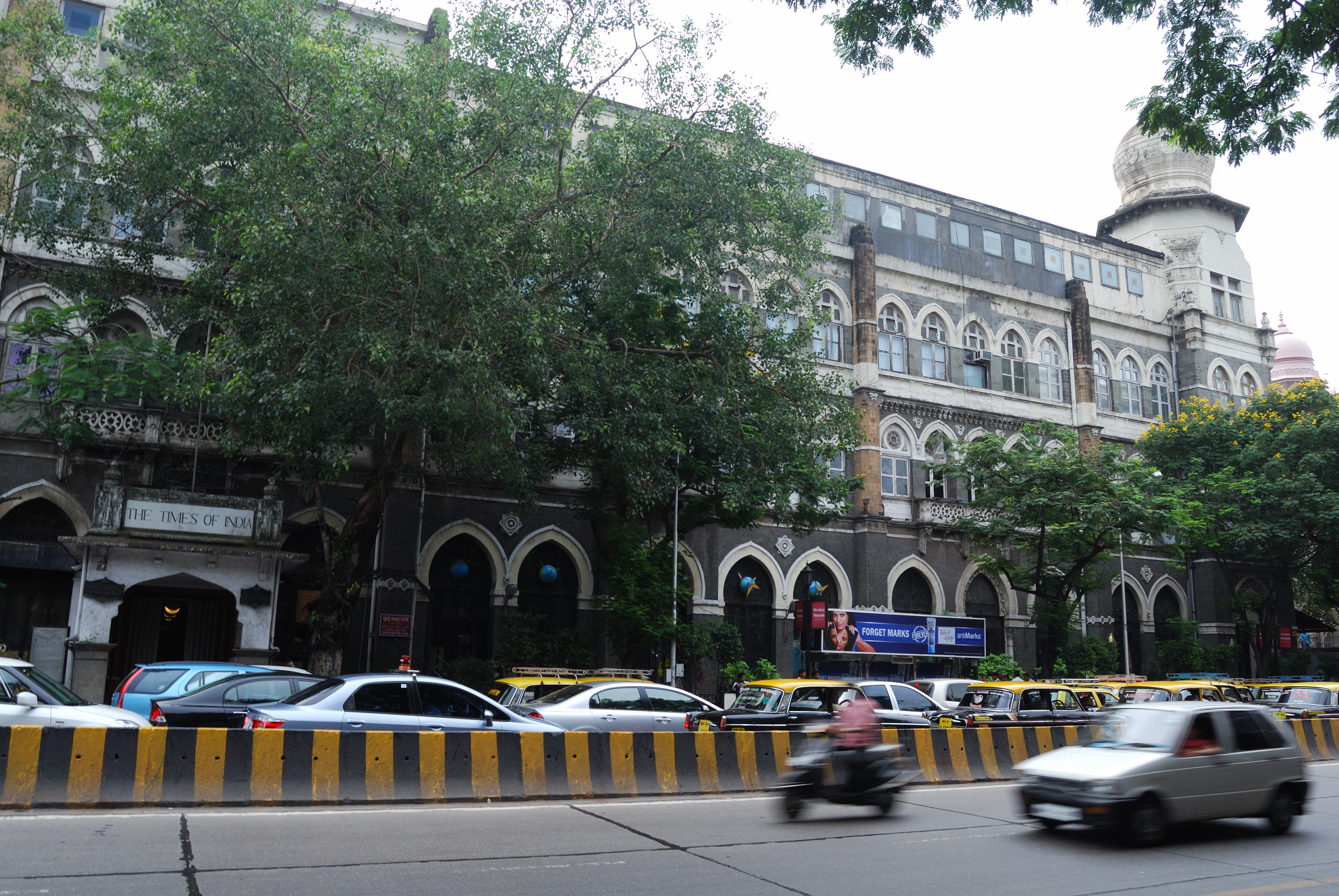
The Times of India's first office is opposite the Chhatrapati Shivaji Terminus where it was founded.

Mumbai has numerous newspaper publications, television and radio stations. Marathi dailies enjoy the maximum readership share in the city and the top Marathi-language newspapers are Maharashtra Times, Navakaal, Lokmat, Loksatta, Mumbai Chaufer, Saamana and Sakaal. English-language newspapers published in Mumbai include The Times of India, Hindustan Times, and The Indian Express. Asia's oldest newspaper, Bombay Samachar, has been published in Gujarati since 1822. Bombay Durpan, the first Marathi newspaper, was founded by Balshastri Jambhekar in 1832.

The metropolis is the hub of many international media corporations, with many news channels and print publications. The national television broadcaster, Doordarshan, provides two free terrestrial channels, while three main cable networks serve most households. Prominent DTH entertainment services in Mumbai include Dish TV and Tata Sky.

There are twelve radio stations in Mumbai, with nine broadcasting on the FM band, and three All India Radio stations broadcasting on the AM band. Mumbai has access to Commercial radio providers such as Sirius. The Conditional Access System started by the Union Government in 2006 met a poor response in Mumbai due to competition from its sister technology Direct-to-Home transmission service.

== Sports ==
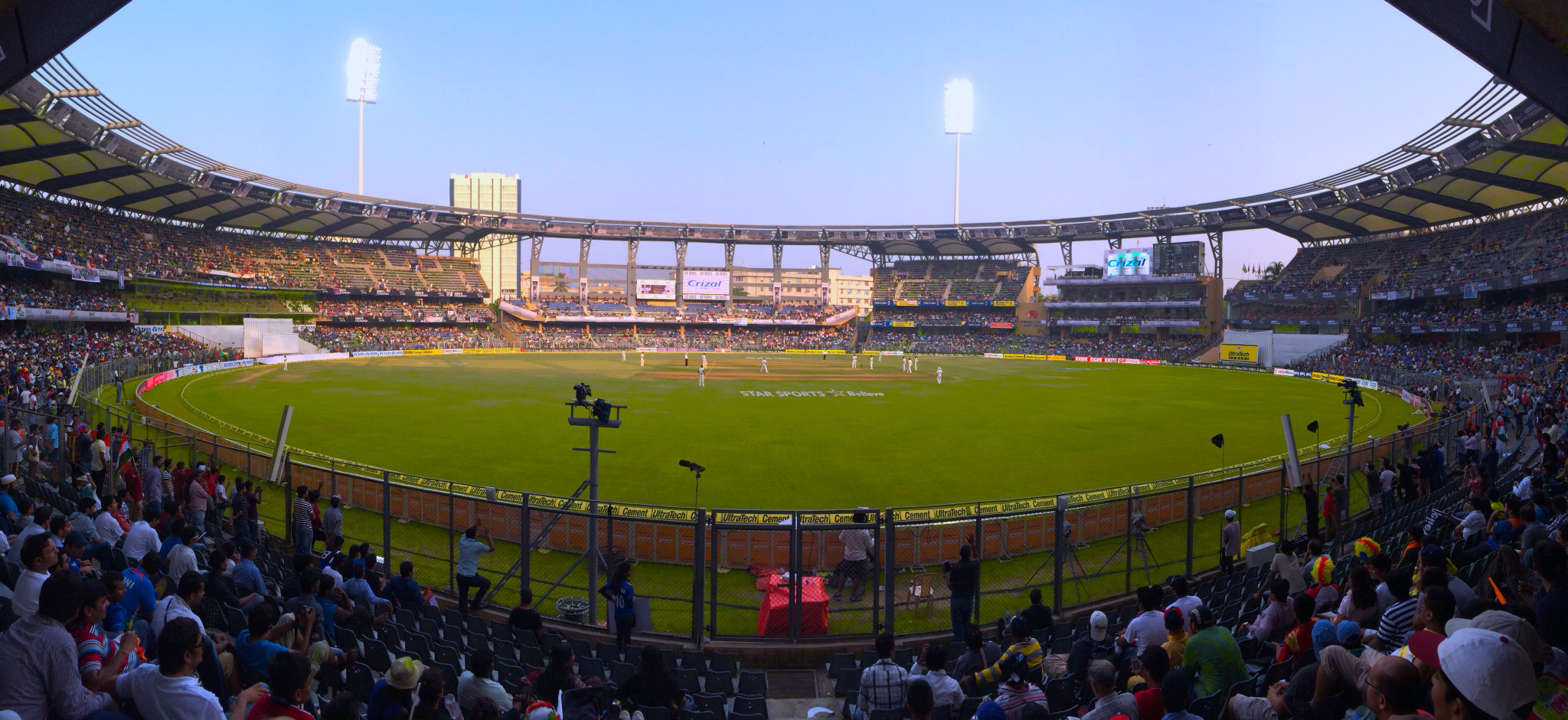
Wankhede Stadium

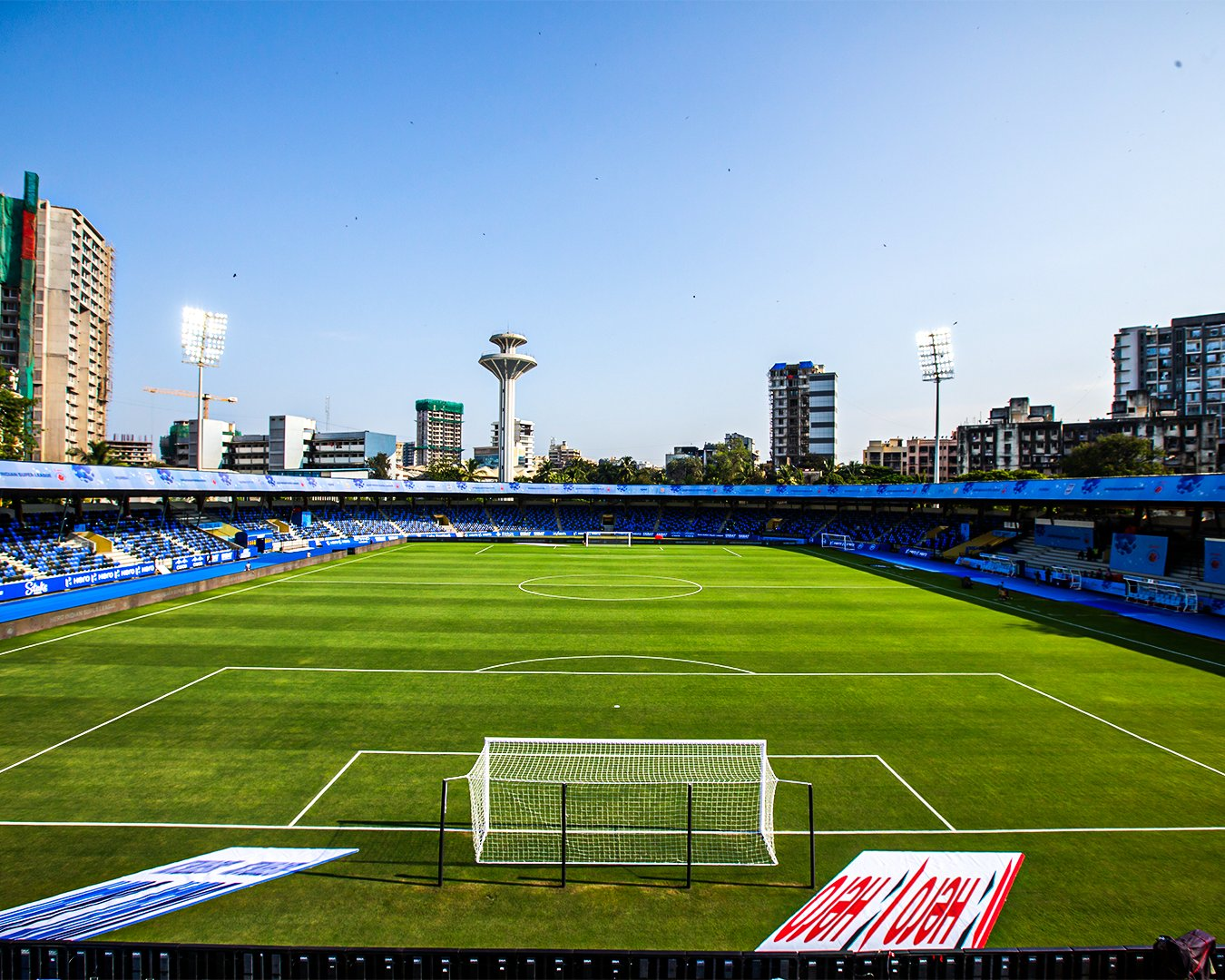
Mumbai Football Arena

Cricket is more popular than any other sport in Mumbai. It is home to the Board of Control for Cricket in India (BCCI) and Indian Premier League (IPL). Mumbai's first-class team Mumbai cricket team has won 41 Ranji Trophy titles, the most by any team. The city based Mumbai Indians compete in the Indian Premier League. Mumbai has two international cricket stadiums, the Wankhede Stadium and the Brabourne Stadium. The first cricket test match in India was played in Mumbai at the Bombay Gymkhana. The biggest cricketing event to be staged in the city so far is the final of the 2011 ICC Cricket World Cup which was played at the Wankhede Stadium. Mumbai and London are the only two cities to have hosted both a World Cup final and the final of an ICC Champions Trophy which was played at the Brabourne Stadium in 2006.

Football is another popular sport in the city, with the FIFA World Cup and the English Premier League being followed widely. The Mumbai City FC of Indian Super League (ISL) play their home matches at the Mumbai Football Arena. While the I-League 2 club Mumbai Kenkre FC uses the Cooperage Ground as home ground.

Mumbai's first professional American football franchise, the Mumbai Gladiators, played its first season, in Pune, in late 2012.

In field hockey, Mumbai is home to the Mumbai Marines and Mumbai Magicians in the World Series Hockey and Hockey India League respectively. Matches in the city are played at the Mahindra Hockey Stadium.

The Indian Badminton League (IBL), now known as the Premier Badminton League is also visiting Mumbai since its inaugural edition in 2013 when the final was held in Mumbai's National Sports Club of India.

Rugby is another growing sport in Mumbai with league matches being held at the Bombay Gymkhana from June to November.

Every February, Mumbai holds derby races at the Mahalaxmi Racecourse. Mcdowell's Derby is held in February at the Turf Club in Mumbai. In March 2004, the Mumbai Grand Prix was part of the F1 powerboat world championship, and the Force India F1 team car was unveiled in the city, in 2008. In 2004, the annual Mumbai Marathon was established as a part of "The Greatest Race on Earth". Mumbai had also played host to the Kingfisher Airlines Tennis Open, an International Series tournament of the ATP World Tour, in 2006 and 2007.

Mumbai hosted the 141st IOC Session from 15 to 17 October 2023.

Regional and professional sports teams from Mumbai

Team/Club	Tournament/League	Sport	Venue	Established
Mumbai cricket team	Ranji Trophy Vijay Hazare Trophy Syed Musthaq Ali Trophy	Cricket	Wankhede Stadium Brabourne Stadium	1930
Maharashtra football team	Santosh Trophy	Football	–	1941
Mumbai Indians	Indian Premier League	Cricket	Wankhede Stadium Brabourne Stadium	2008
Mumbai Marines	World Series Hockey	Field hockey	Mahindra Hockey Stadium	2011
Mumbai Gladiators	Elite Football League of India	American football	–	2012
Mumbai Rockets	Premier Badminton League	Badminton	National Sports Club of India	2013
Mumbai City FC	Indian Super League	Football	Mumbai Football Arena	2014
U Mumba	Pro Kabaddi League	Kabaddi	Sardar Vallabhbhai Patel Indoor Stadium	2014
Mumbai Tennis Masters	Champions Tennis League	Tennis	Kalina Stadium	2014
Mumbai Stars	Elite Pro Basketball League	Basketball	–	2023

Former regional and professional sports teams from Mumbai

Team/Club	Tournament/League	Sport	Venue	Established	Ceased
Mumbai Champs	Indian Cricket League	Cricket	N/A	2007	2009
Mumbai Marines	World Series Hockey	Field hockey	Mahindra Hockey Stadium	2011	2013
Mumbai Magicians	Hockey India League	Field hockey	Mahindra Hockey Stadium	2012	2014
Mumbai Masters	Premier Badminton League	Badminton	National Sports Club of India	2013	2016
Mumbai FC	I-League	Football	Cooperage Ground	2007	2017
Mumbai Challengers	UBA Pro Basketball League	Basketball	–	2015	2017

== International relations ==
=== Twin towns and sister cities ===
Source: The Hindustan Times

- St. Petersburg, Russia (1963)
- Yokohama, Japan (1965)
- Stuttgart, Germany (1968)
- Honolulu, US (1970)
- Los Angeles, US (1972)
- New York City, US (1975)
- Busan, South Korea (1977)
- Jakarta, Indonesia (1995)
- Nadi, Fiji (1996)
- İzmir, Turkey (1997)
- Galați, Romania (2005)
- Antananarivo, Madagascar (2008)
- Zagreb, Croatia (2009)
- Barcelona, Spain (2012)
- Odesa, Ukraine (2013)
- Shanghai, China (2014)

== See also ==
- List of people from Mumbai
- List of cities in India by area
- List of million-plus urban agglomerations in India
- List of twin towns and sister cities in India
- INS Mumbai – Guided-missile destroyer of Indian Navy
