= History of Mumbai under Hindu rule =

The Ancient history of Mumbai recounts the history of Mumbai from 300 BCE to 1348 CE.

== History ==
The seven islands of Bombay.

The present-day Mumbai was originally an archipelago of seven islands. Pleistocene sediments found around Kandivali, on Salsette Island, north of the seven islands, by Todd in 1939, indicate that these islands were inhabited since the Stone Age. The archipelago had been named after the Koli Goddess Mumbadevi. The port of Sopara (present-day Nala Sopara, near Mumbai) was an important trading centre during ancient times. In the 3rd century BCE, the islands were incorporated into the Maurya Empire under the expansion campaign of Emperor Ashoka of Magadha. The empire's patronage gradually made the islands a centre of the Hindu and Buddhist religion and culture. Buddhist monks, scholars, and artists created the artwork, inscriptions, and sculpture of the Kanheri and Mahakali caves. The total number of Buddhist cave temples numbered 109, dating from the end of the 2nd century BCE. After the decline of the Maurya Empire around 185 BCE, these islands fell to the Satvahanas.

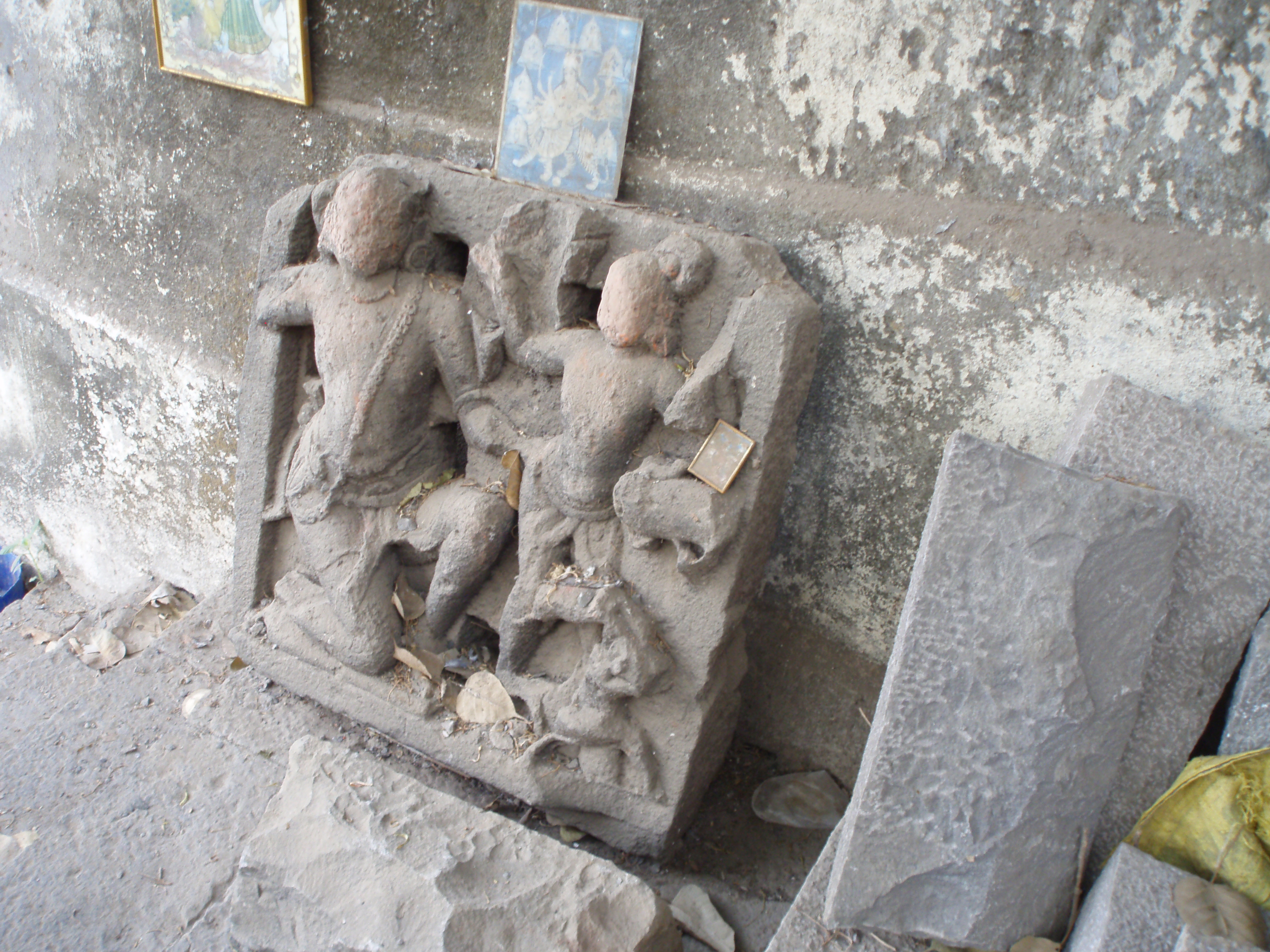
Ancient statues of the Silhara dynasty around the Walkeshwar Temple

The islands were known as Heptanesia (Ancient Greek: A Cluster of Seven Islands) to the Greek geographer Ptolemy in 150 CE. After the end of the Satvahana rule in 250 CE, the Abhiras of Western Maharashtra and Vakatakas of Vidarbha held dominion over Bombay. The Abhiras ruled for 167 years, till around 417 CE. During the 5th century, Bombay was ruled by the Kalachuris. These islands were then acquired by the Mauryas of Konkan, who were feudatories of Kalachuris. The Jogeshwari Caves were constructed during the Mauryan regime between 520 and 550. The Mauryan presence ended when the Chalukyas under Pulakeshin II invaded Bombay in 610. During 749–750, Dantidurga of the Rashtrakuta Dynasty conquered Bombay. The Silhara dynasty ruled the region between 810 and 1240. The Banganga Tank, Walkeshwar Temple, and Elephanta Caves were constructed under the patronage of the Silhara rulers. The Italian explorer Marco Polo had sailed through the islands of Bombay during the 13th century. In the 13th century, King Bhimdev had built his capital in Mahikawati, present day Mahim and Prabhadevi. After his death in 1303, he was succeeded by his son Pratapbimba, who had built his capital city at Marol in Salsette, which he named Pratappur. The islands were wrested from Pratapbimba's control by Mubarak, the emperor of Delhi, who had occupied Mahim and Salsette under his expansion campaign in 1318. But it was later reconquered by Pratapbimba, which he ruled till 1331. Later, his brother-in-law Nagardev reigned for 17 years till 1348. In 1348, the islands came under the control of the Muzaffarid dynasty of Gujarat, thus ending the sovereignty of Hindu rulers over the islands of Bombay.
