= Malabar Hill =

- Neighbourhood
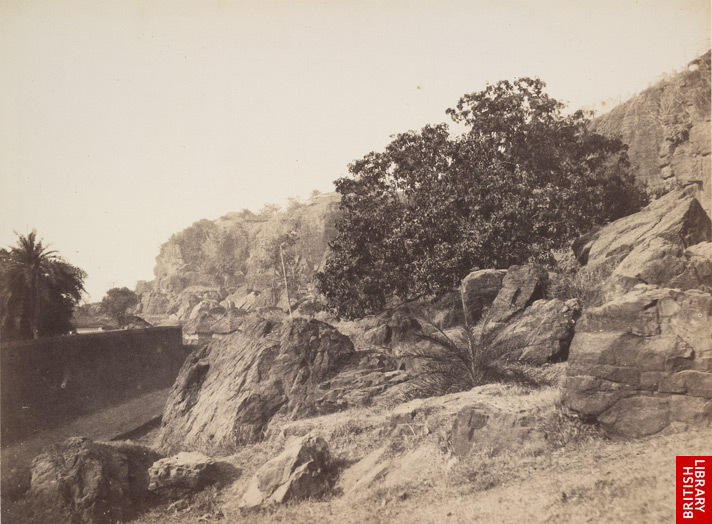
- Malabar Hill in the 1850s

- Location within India Location within Maharashtra Location within Mumbai
- Coordinates: 18.95°N 72.795°E
- Country: India
- State: Maharashtra
- District: Mumbai City
- City: Mumbai

Government
  - Type: Municipal Corporation
  - Body: Brihanmumbai Municipal Corporation (MCGM)

Languages
  - Official: Marathi
- Time zone: UTC+5:30 (IST)
- PIN: 400006
- Area code: 022
- Vehicle registration: MH 01
- Civic agency: BMC

Malabar Hill is amongst the most affluent residential areas in Mumbai. It is home to several business tycoons and film personalities.

Prominent landmarks include the Chief Minister of Maharashtra's Varsha Bungalow, Government Guest House Sahyadri, official residences of VVIP state officials and additionally the Hanging Gardens, Jain Temple and Banganga Tank. Other notable residents include Radhakishan Damani and Syedna Mufaddal Saifuddin.

== History ==
Malabar Hill is the location of the Walkeshwar Temple, founded by the Silhara kings. The original temple was destroyed by the Portuguese, but rebuilt again in 1715 by Rama Kamath, and by 1860, 10 to 20 other temples were built in the region.

Mountstuart Elphinstone built the first British bungalow in Malabar Hill while he was Governor of Bombay, between 1819 and 1827. Following his example, the place soon became an affluent locality, as it remains today.

== Overview ==
South Court (informally known as the 'Jinnah House'), the former residence of Mohammad Ali Jinnah, founder of Pakistan is also present here, but is closed to public due to property disputes.

Unlike several other high-income neighborhoods in Mumbai, the area includes a notable population of Muslim heritage. The Saifee Mahal complex, located near the top of the hill, houses over 250 members of the Dawoodi Bohra community.

Also, in the Malabar Hill district, there is a cremation ground that sits near the sea which is home to the samadhi shrines of several Indian saints. Among them is the samadhi shrine of the guru of Shri Nisargadatta Maharaj, who was Shri Siddharameshwar Maharaj, as well as the samadhi shrine of his disciple Shri Ranjit Maharaj.

Notable people born in Malabar Hill include singer-songwriter Jaimin Rajani and Douglas Jardine, the cricketer who captained England during the Bodyline tour of Australia in 1932-33.

== Gallery ==
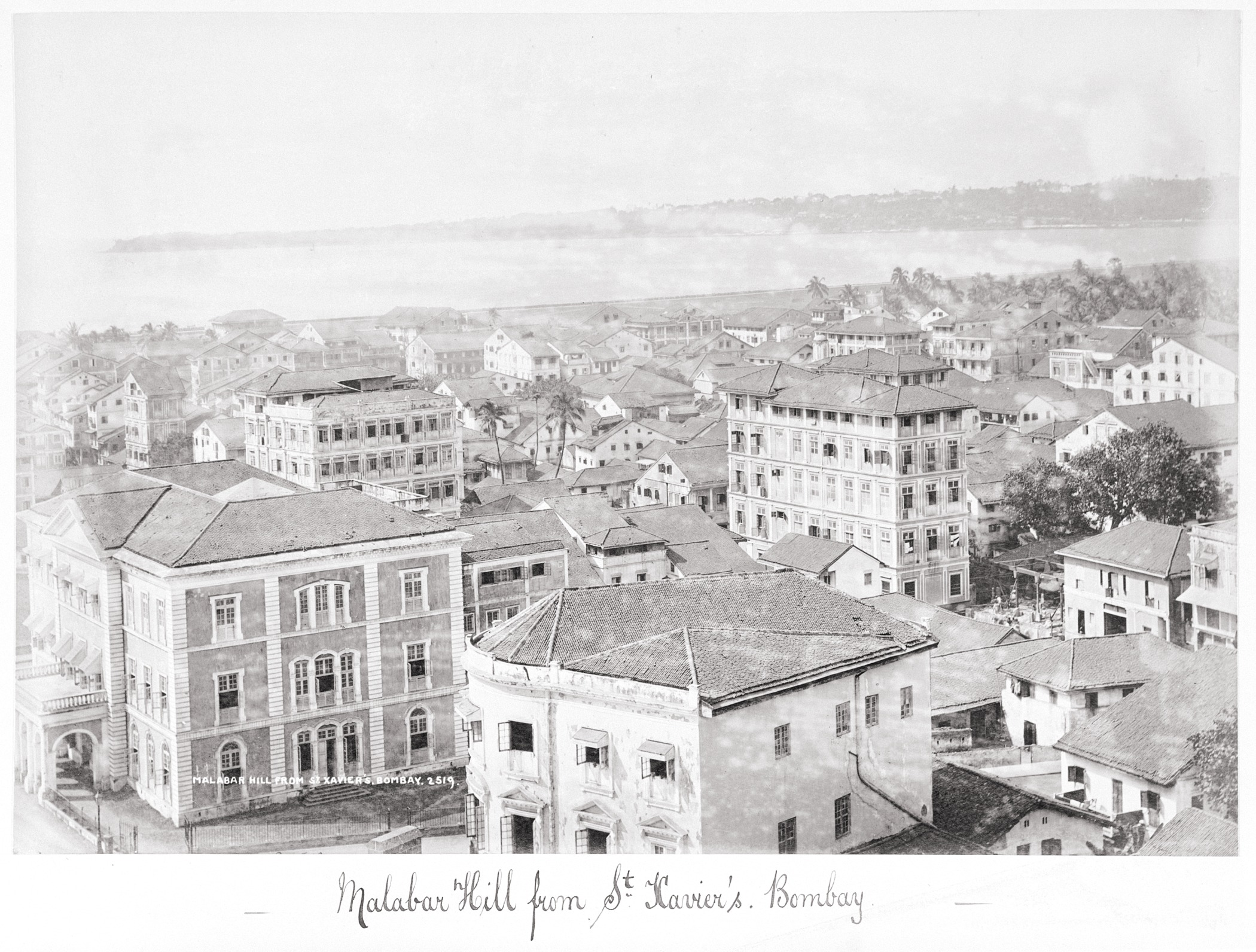
Malabar Hill from St. Xavier's, Late 1860s,

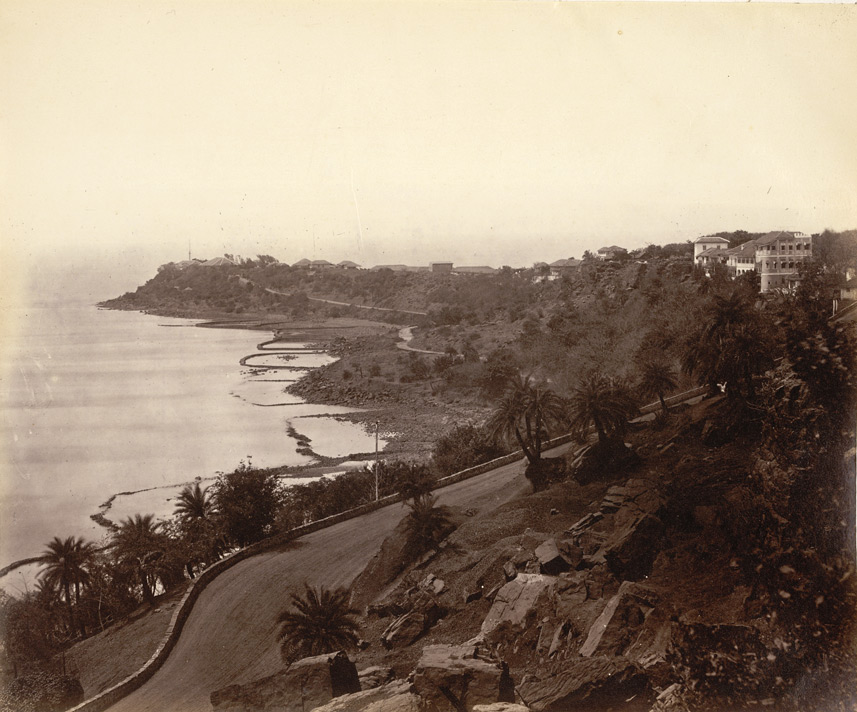
Malabar Point, Bombay, 1865.

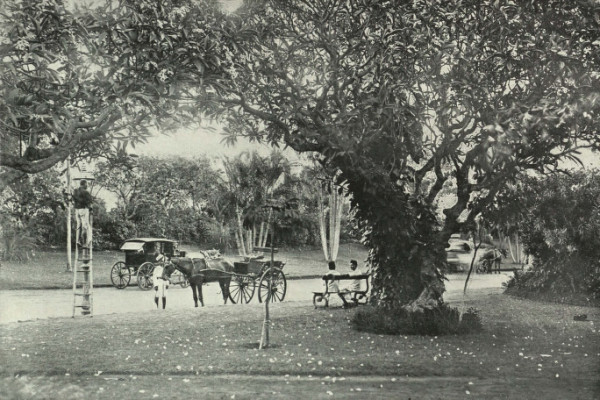
The Hanging Gardens at Malabar Hill (ca. 1905).

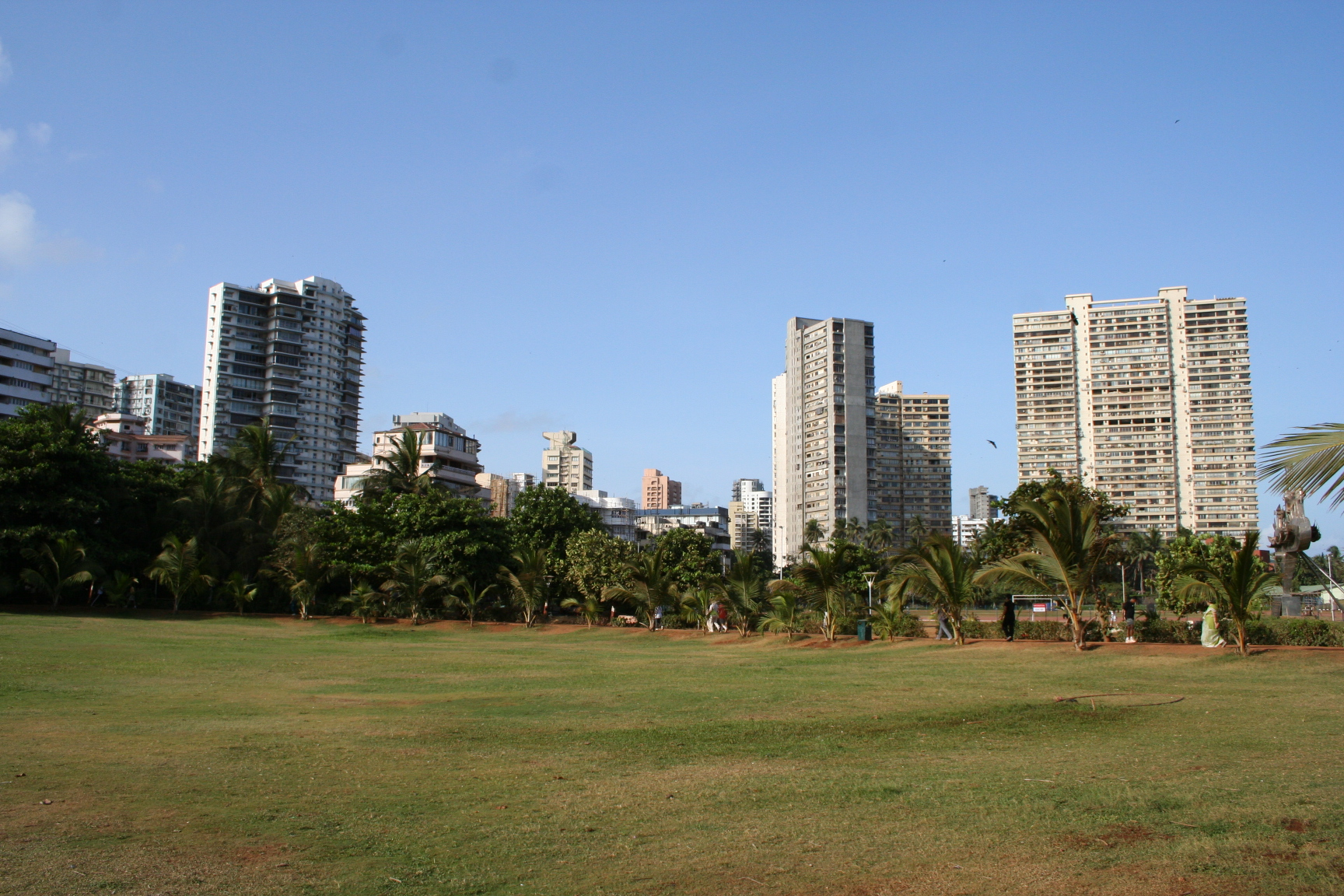
Priyadarshini Park in Mumbai.

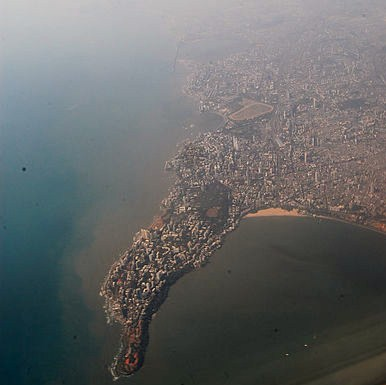
Aerial view of Malabar Hill.

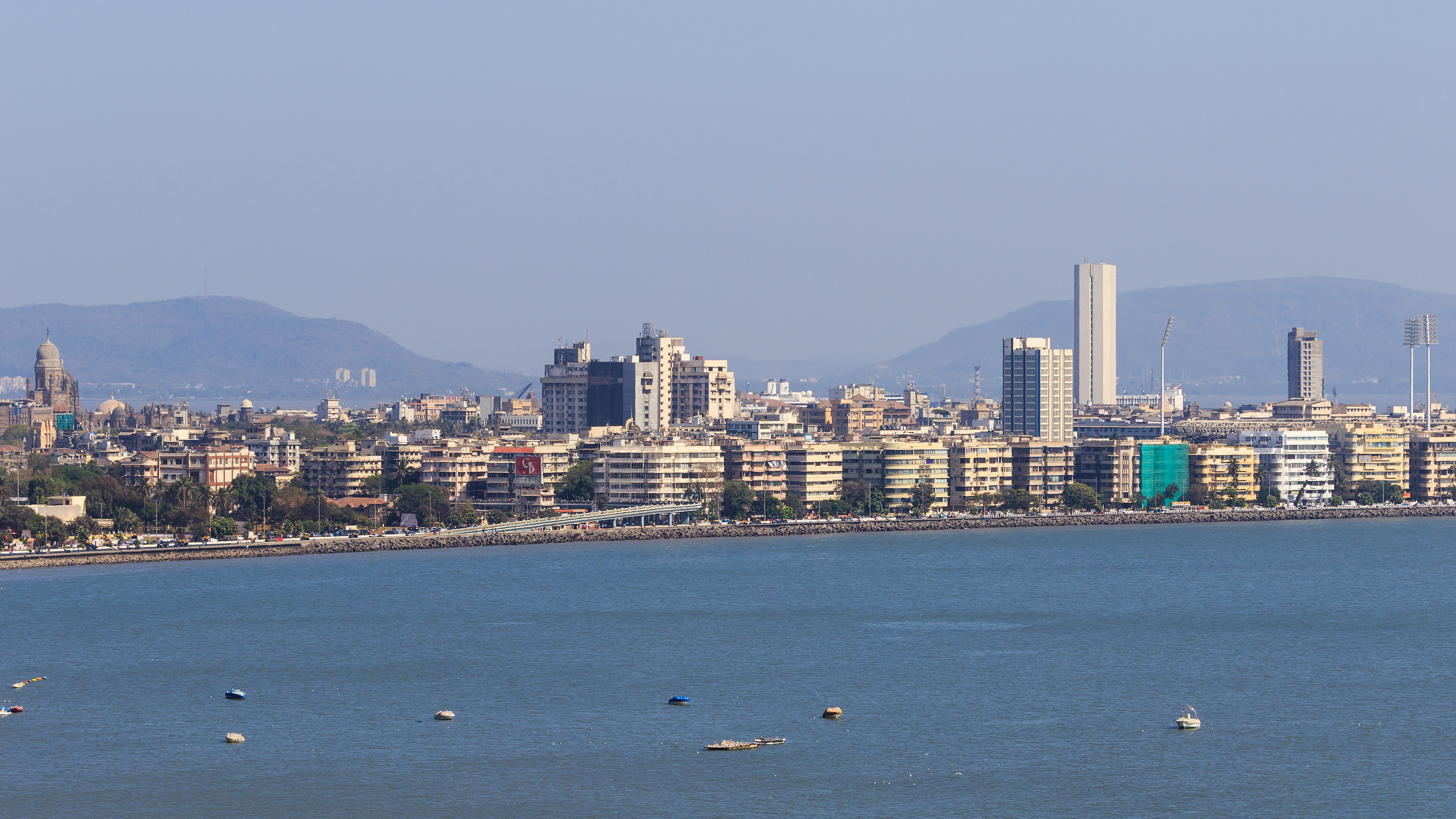
View of Marine Drive, Mumbai from Malabar Hill.

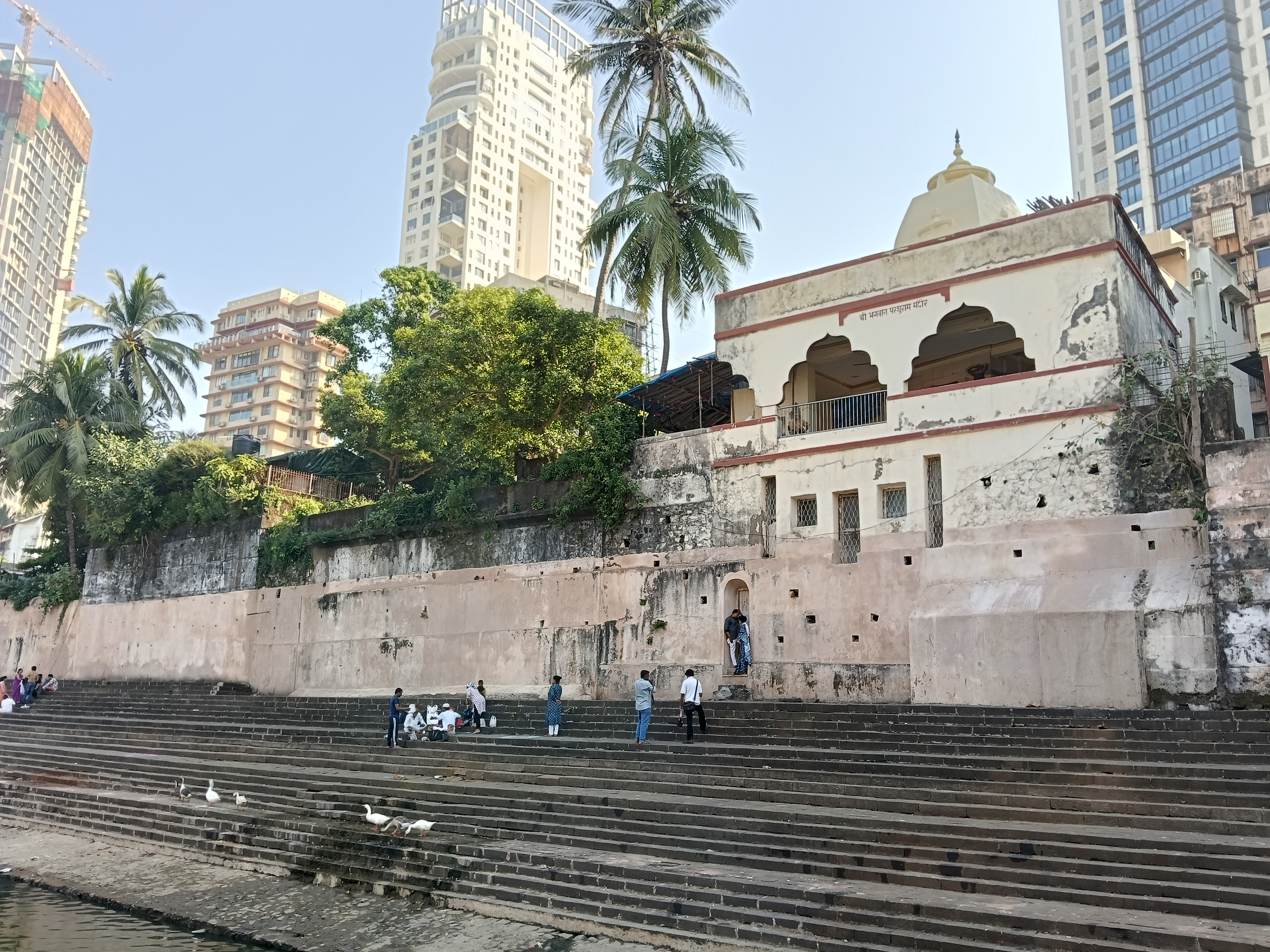
Shree Bhagwan Parshuram Mandir at Banganga in Walkeshwar

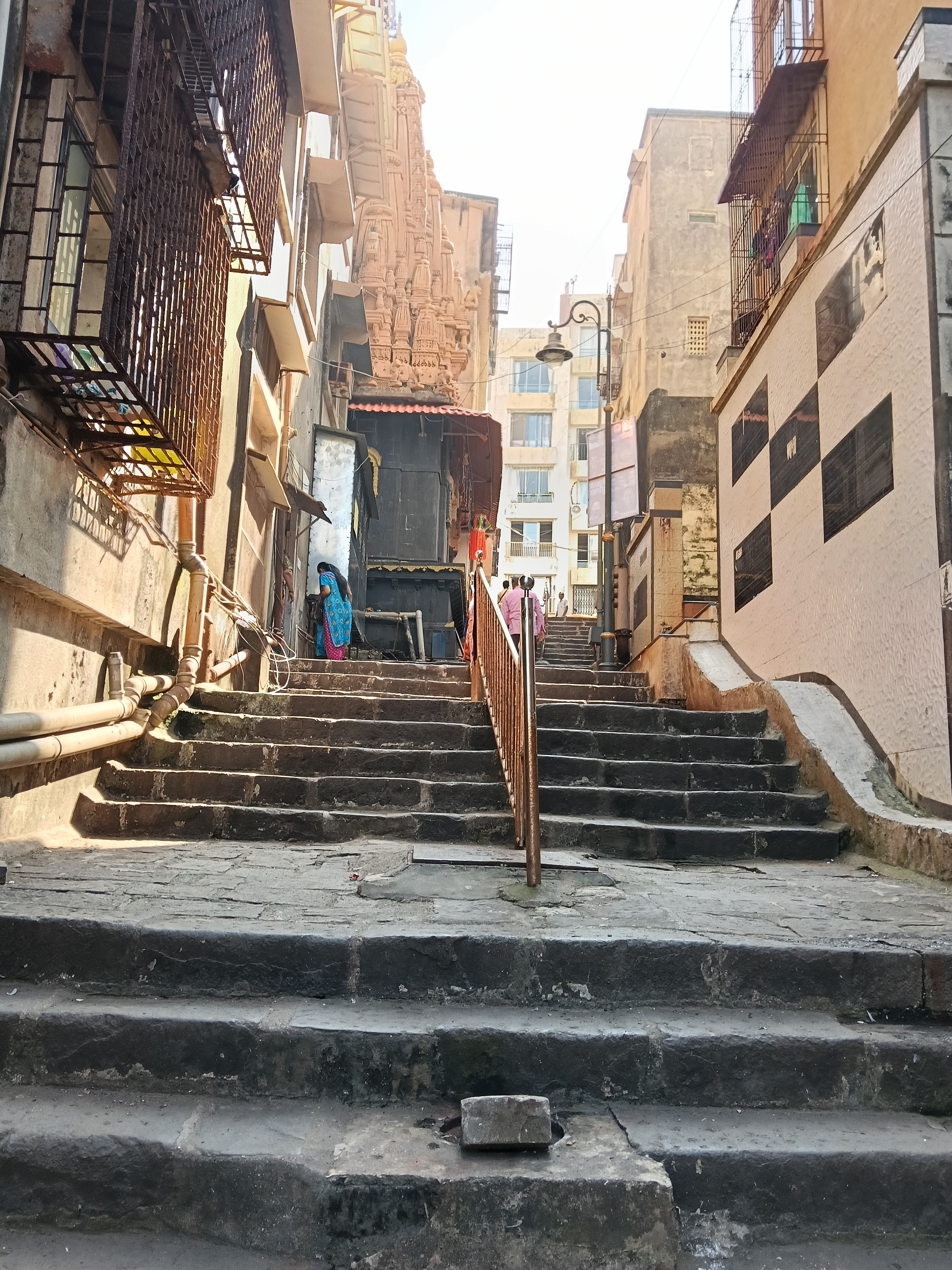
View of the Jabreshwar Mahadev Mandir Street at Banganga Tank
