= Jabreshwar Mahadev Mandir =

Lord Shiva temple in Mumbai

- जब्रेश्वर महादेव मंदिर
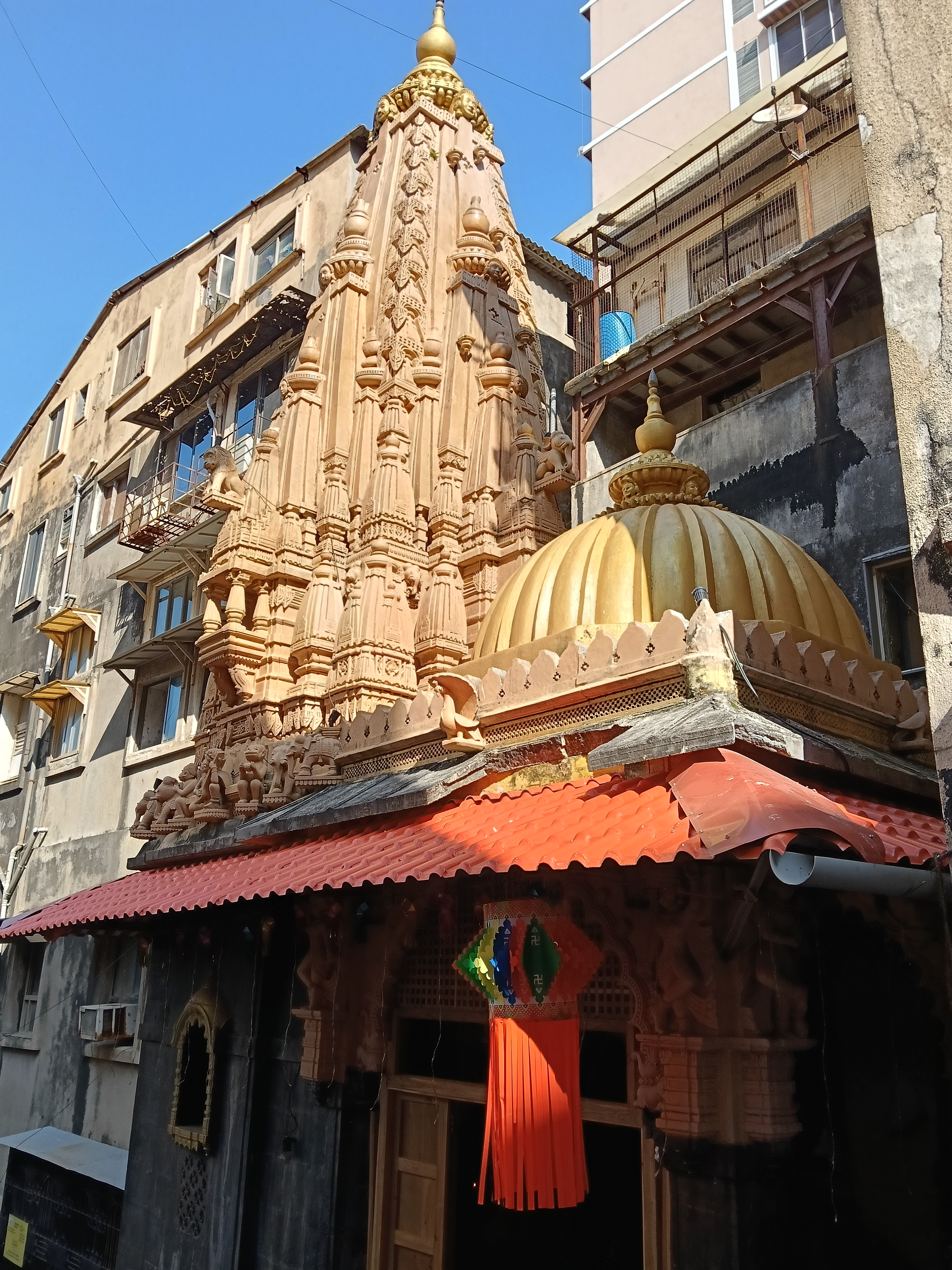
- View of Jabreshwar Mahadev Mandir

Religion
- Affiliation: Hinduism
- District: Mumbai
- Deity: Lord Shiva

Location
- Location: Banganga, Walkeshwar
- State: Maharashtra
- Country: India
- Interactive map of Jabreshwar Mahadev Mandir
- Coordinates: 18.9446856°N 72.7941445°E

Architecture
- Type: North Indian
- Style: Nagara Style
- Founder: Nathubhai Ramdas
- Established: 1840

Jabreshwar Mahadev Mandir (Marathi: जब्रेश्वर महादेव मंदिर) is a Hindu temple dedicated to Lord Shiva in Mumbai. It is also written as Jabreshwar Mahadeo Temple. It is located at the legendary Banganga tank in the Walkeshwar area of the Malabar Hill residencial in the city of Mumbai. It was built in the North Indian Nagara style having elegant shikhara that rises above the garbagriha of the temple. It was built in the 19th century by Nathubhai Ramdas.

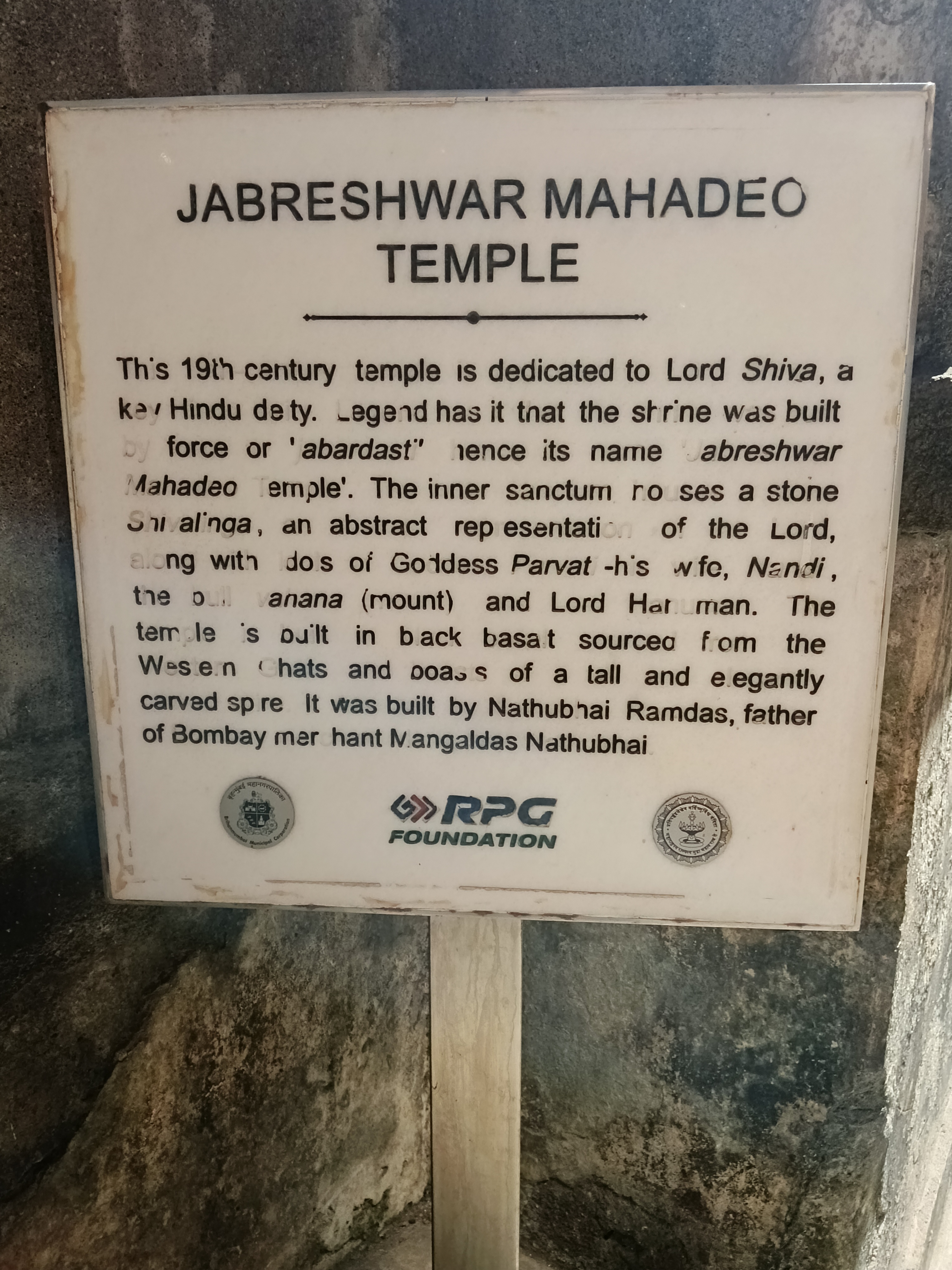
Inscription board at the Jabreshwar Mahadev Mandir

== Etymology ==
According to the inscription board installed at the temple, it was built forcefully. The indic term used for forcefully is Jabardasti. The name of the temple is derived from the Indic term Jabardasti.

== Description ==
The temple of Jabreshwar Mahadev was built in the year 1840. According to the inscription board at the temple, the founder Nathubhai Ramdas of the temple was the father of the then merchant Mangaldas Nathubhai in the city.

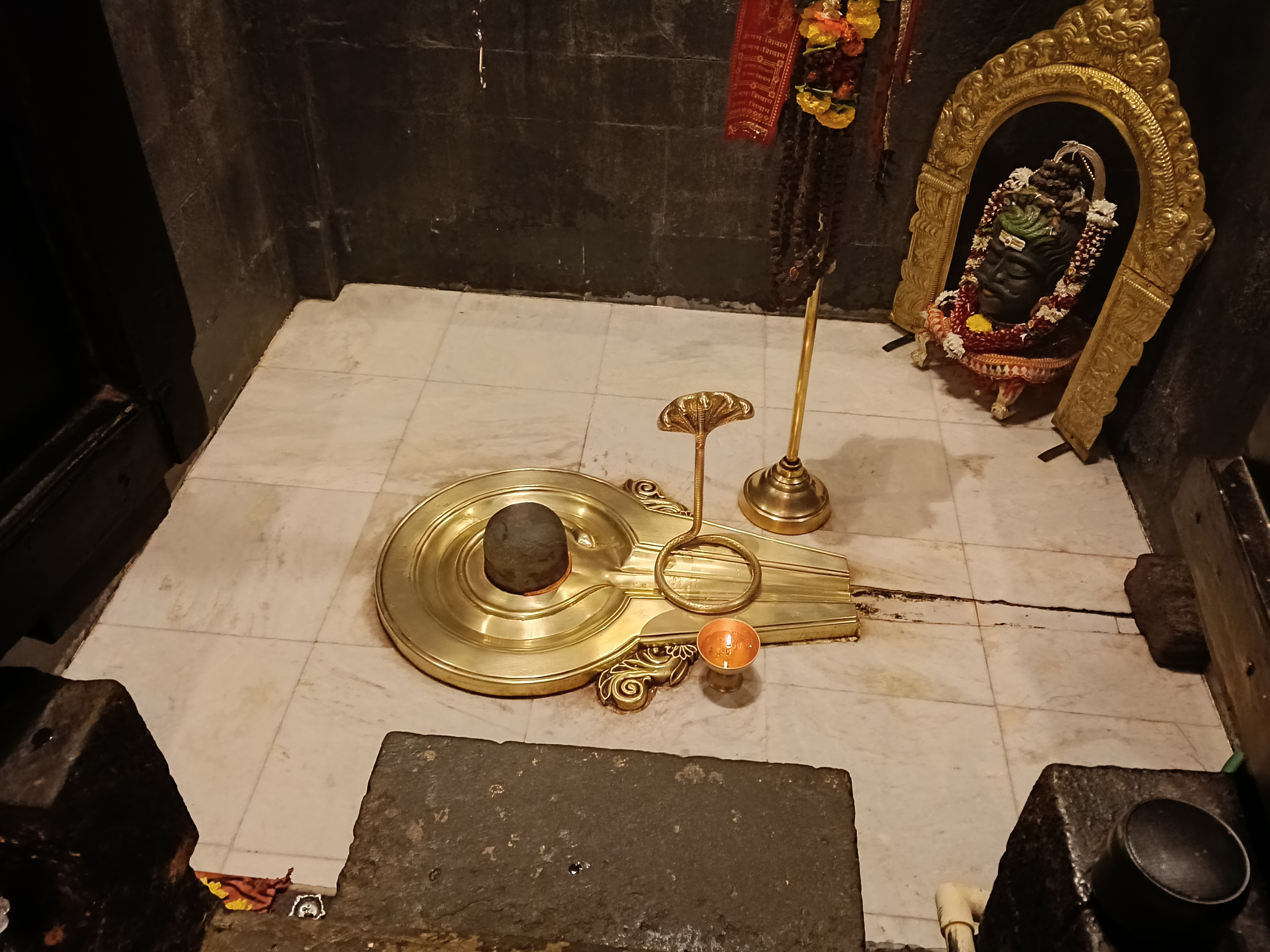
View of the Jabreshwar Mahadev Shivalinga in the temple.

== Gallery ==
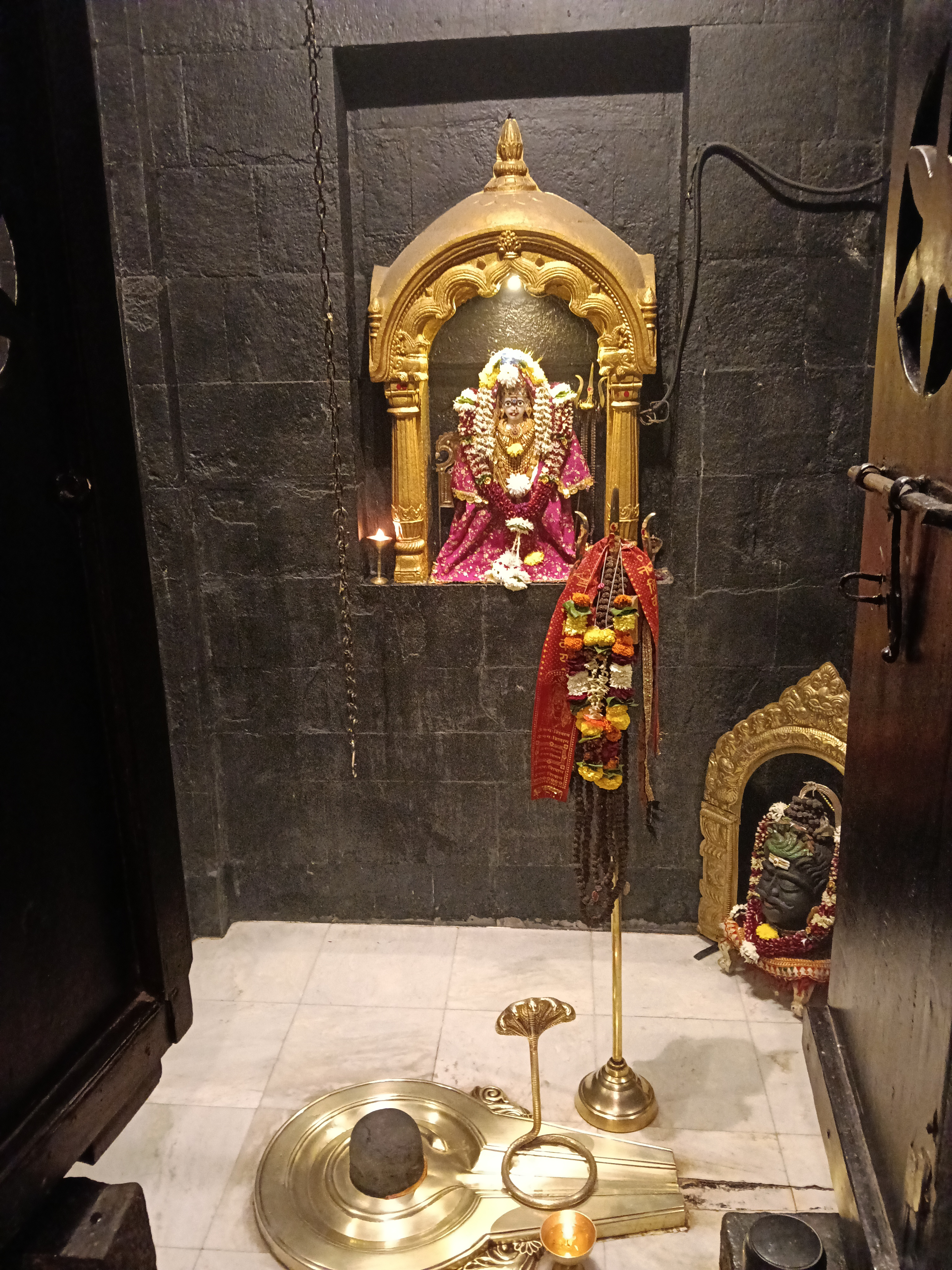
View inside the Garbhgriha of the temple

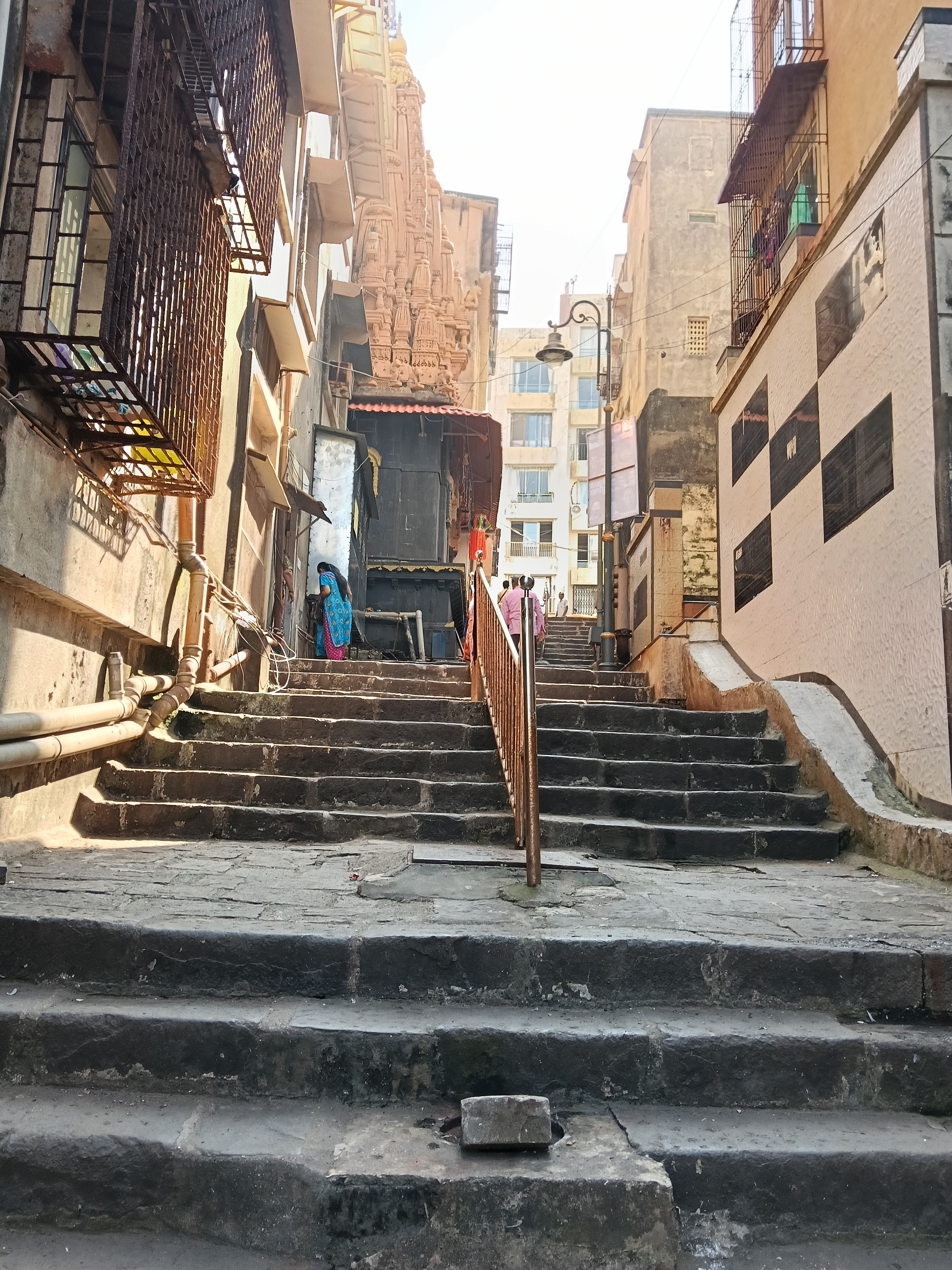
Street view at the temple from Banganga
