= Parshuram Mandir, Walkeshwar =

Parshuram Mandir in Mumbai

Shree Bhagwan Parshuram Mandir
- श्री भगवान परशुराम मंदिर
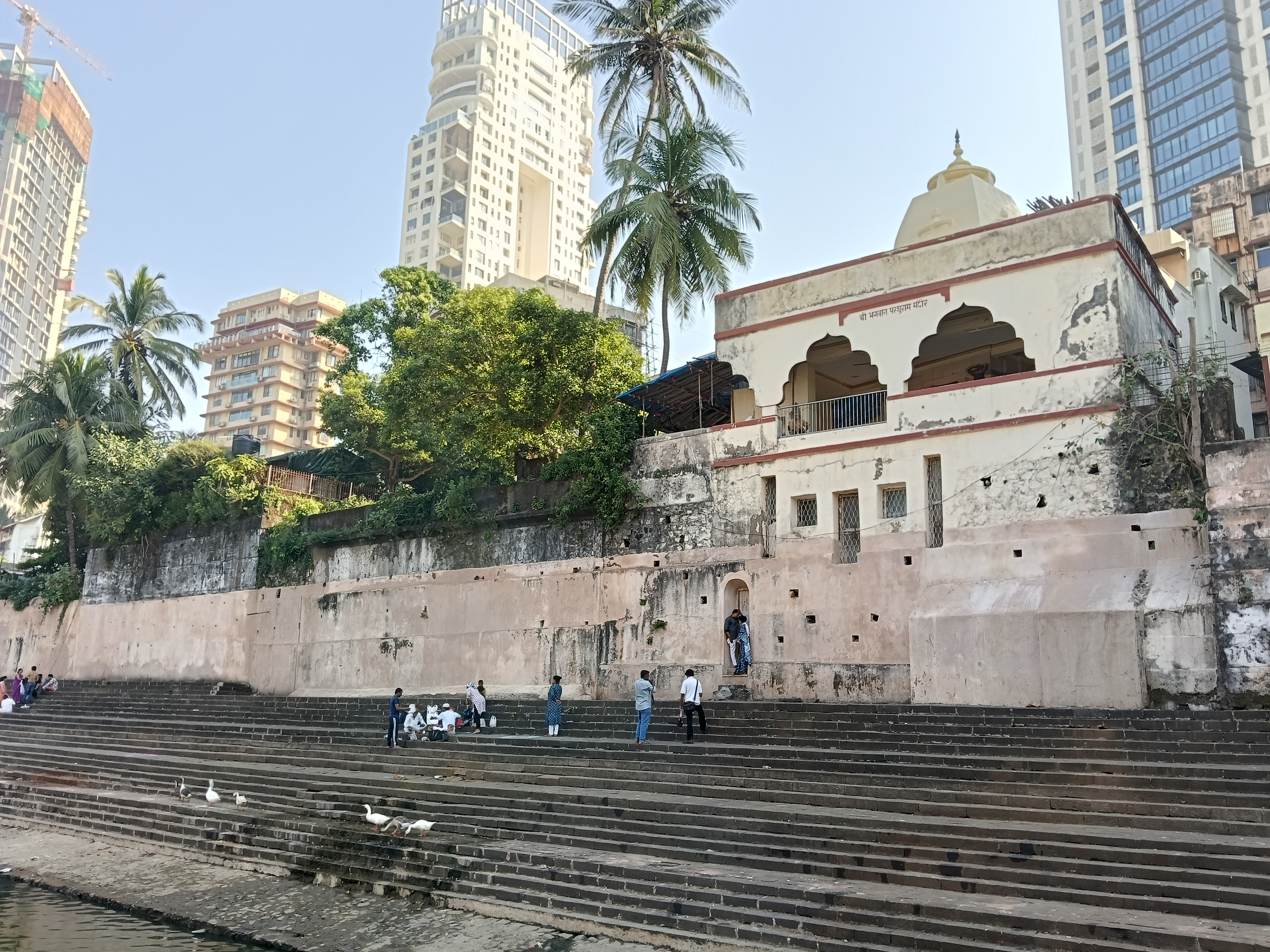
- View of the Parshuram Mandir on the bank of the ancient Banganga tank at Walkeshwar area in the Malabar Hill residencial area of Mumbai.

Religion
- Affiliation: Hinduism
- District: Mumbai
- Deity: Lord Parshuram
- Governing body: Gaud Sarswat Temple Trust

Location
- Location: Walkeshwar
- State: Maharashtra
- Country: India
- Interactive map of Shree Bhagwan Parshuram Mandir
- Coordinates: 18.9450623°N 72.7939628°E

Architecture
- Founder: Hariganga Ranchhoddas Bhansali
- Established: 1965

Parshuram Mandir (Devanagari: परशुराम मंदिर) at Walkeshwar in the city of Mumbai is a Hindu temple dedicated to Lord Parshuram. It is located on the bank of the sacred Banganga tank at Malabar Hill area in South Mumbai. The location of the temple is legendary and associated with Lord Parshuram in Hinduism. The temple is looked after by Gaud Sarswat Brahmins community. It is managed by the trust called as Gaud Sarswat Temple Trust. The present temple was built in 1965.

== Legend ==
According to legend, the location of the Banganga tank is also associated with Lord Parshuram in Hinduism. It is said that Lord Parshuram had arrived at this place during Vedic period. In the text Skanda Purana, there is a legend of Lord Parshuram that he threw his Parshu into the sea to reclaim narrow strip of coastal land along the Konkan region of Maharashtra to Kerala. The Hindu adherents believe that the location of Banganga in Maharashtra is starting point. The term Parshu refers to the battle axe of Lord Parshuram.

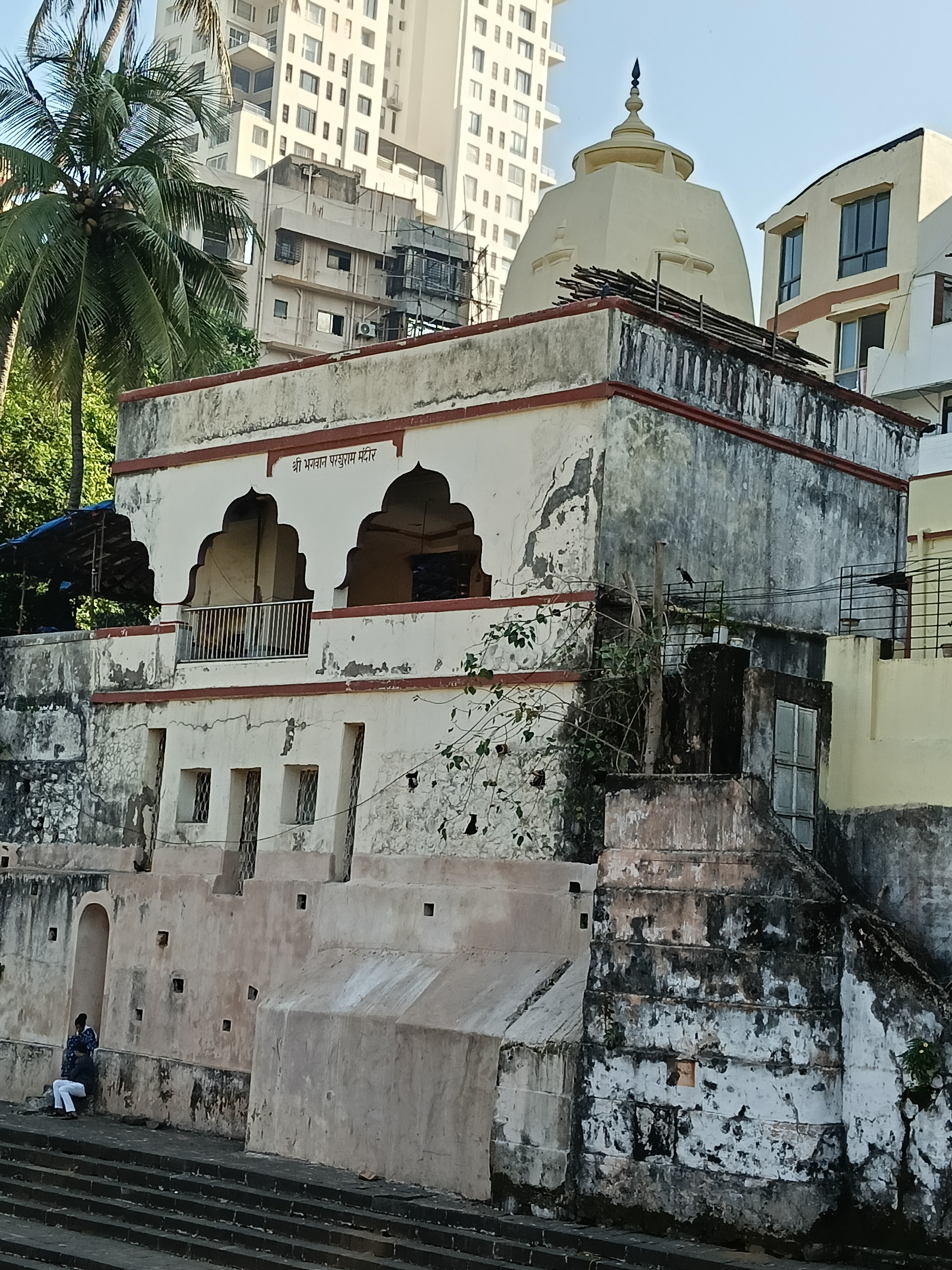
Shree Bhagwan Parshuram Mandir at Banganga

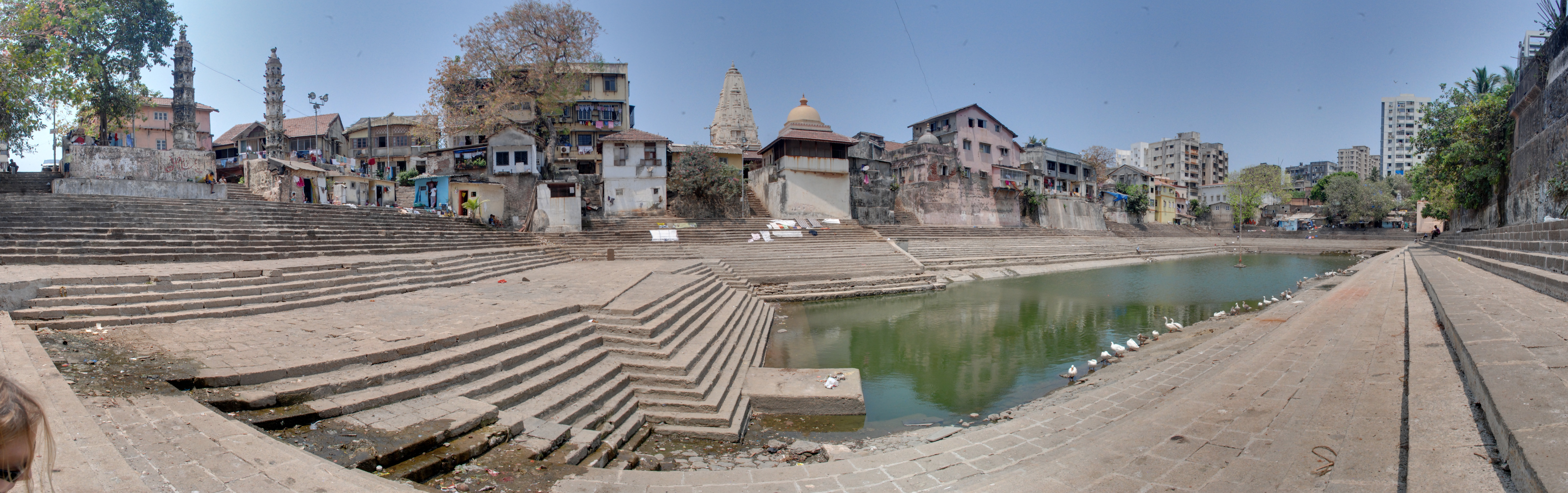
View of the other temples on the bank of Banganga tank opposite to the Parshuram Mandir at Walkeshwar

== History ==
Earlier there was a garden on the western bank of the Banganga tank, owned by a lady Hariganga Ranchhoddas Bhansali. Due the legendary significance of the Banganga tank associated with Lord Parshuram, she donated the land of the garden for the construction of the present Parshuram Mandir to the trust in the February month of the year 1965. The history of the temple is recorded on the inscription board established in the premises of the temple.

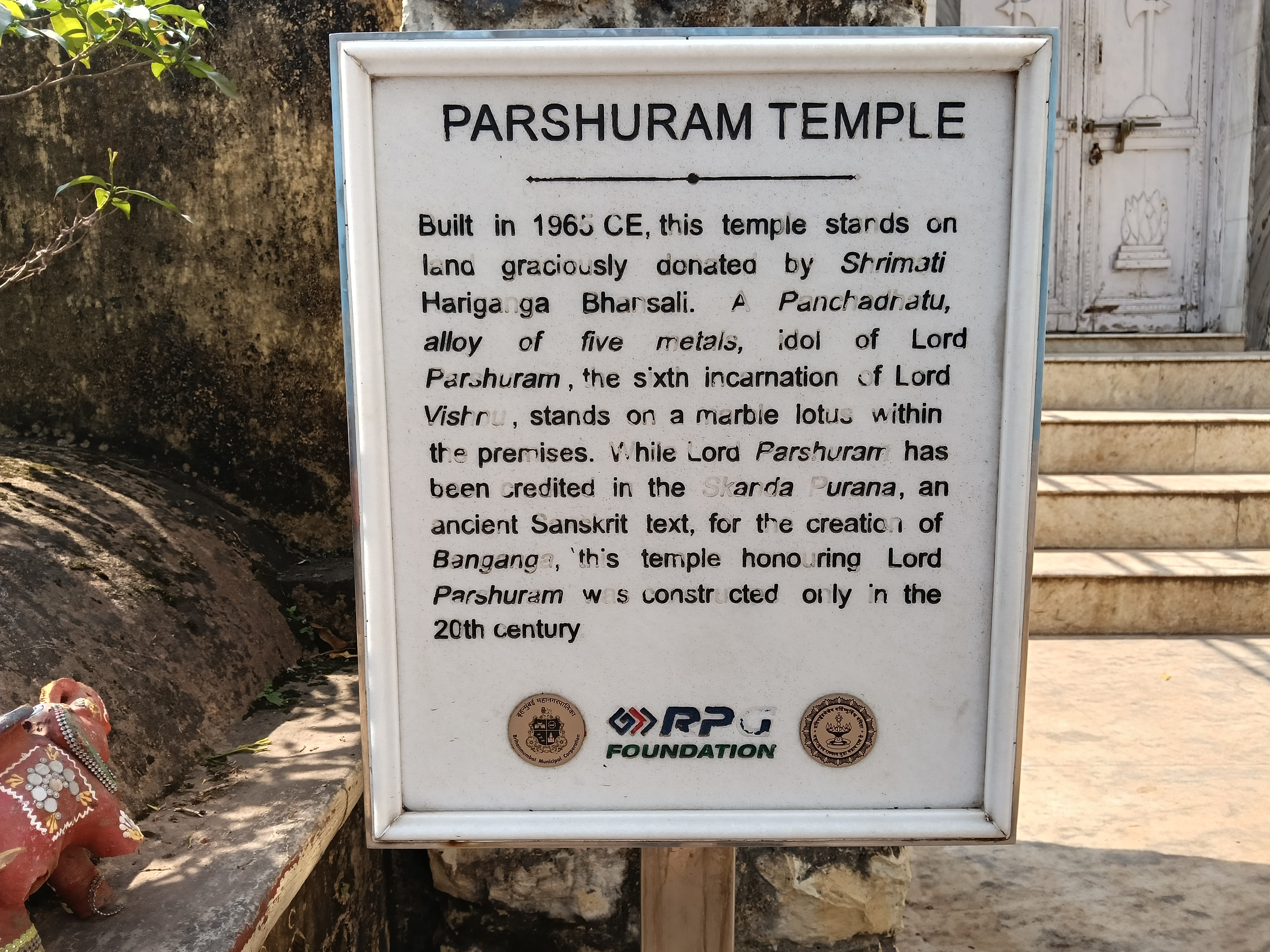
Inscription board at the temple about the history of the present Parshuram Mandir

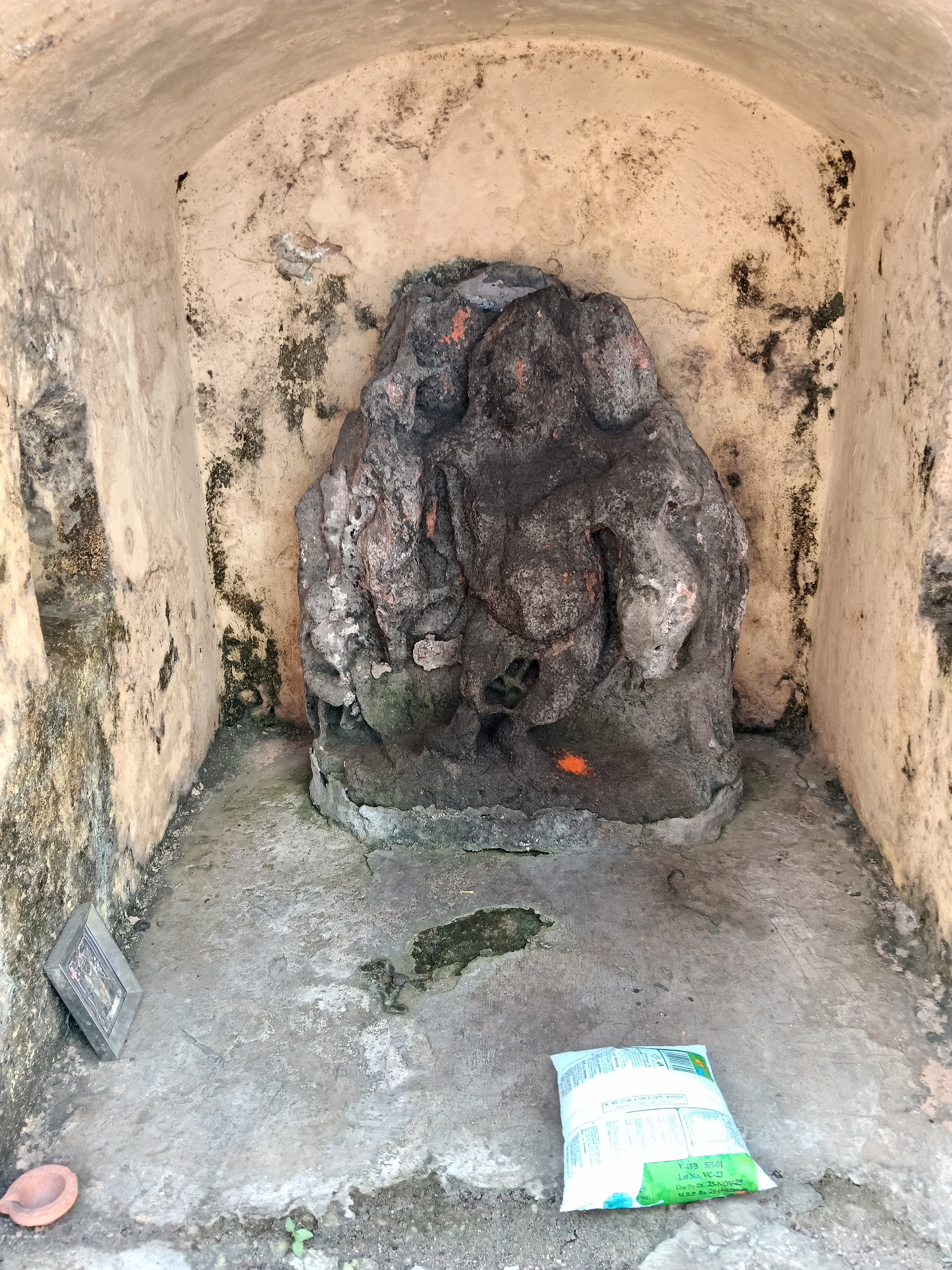
An ancient Hindu deity idol at the gate of the temple.

== Gallery ==
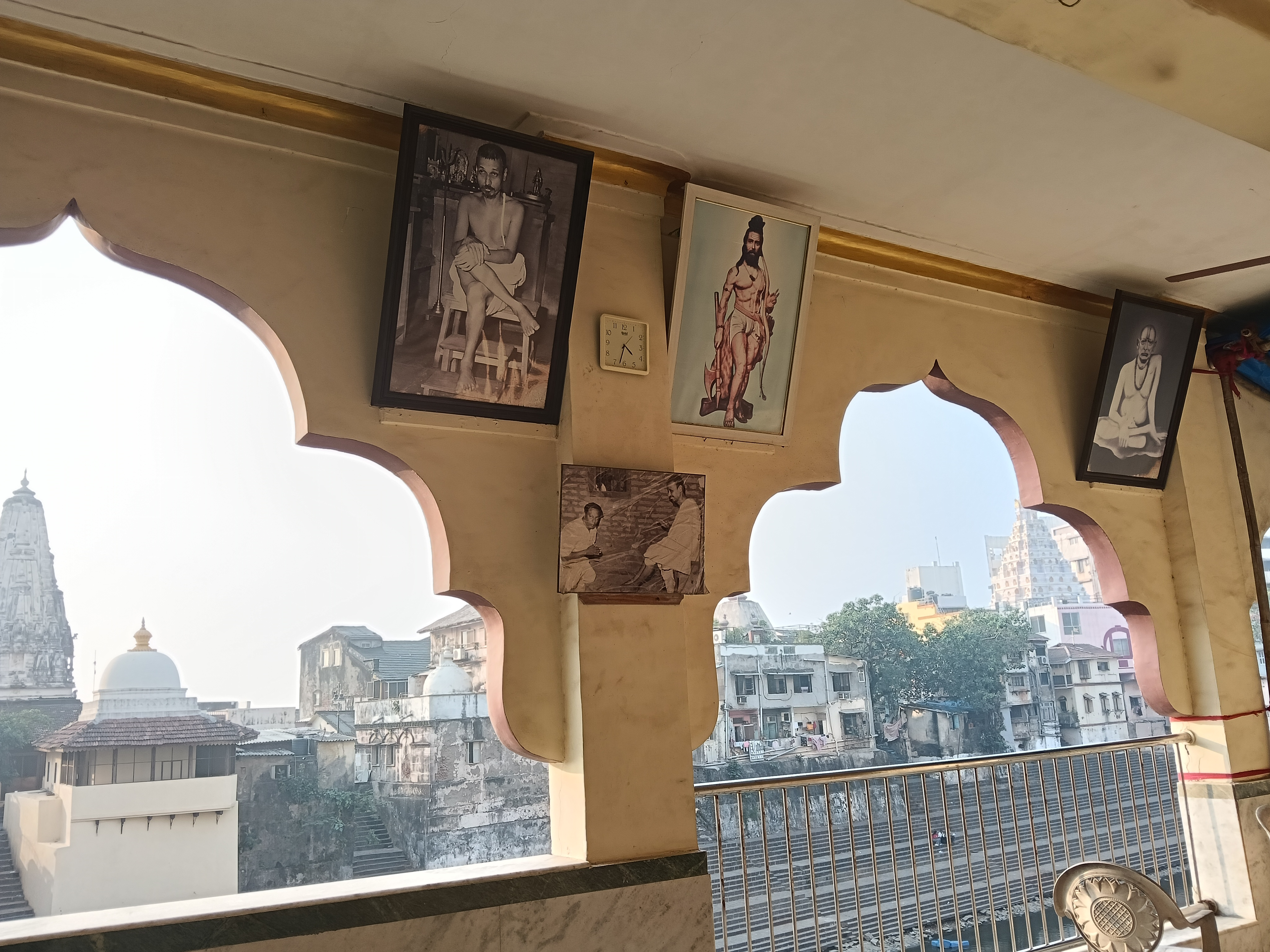
View from inside the temple of Lord Parshuram

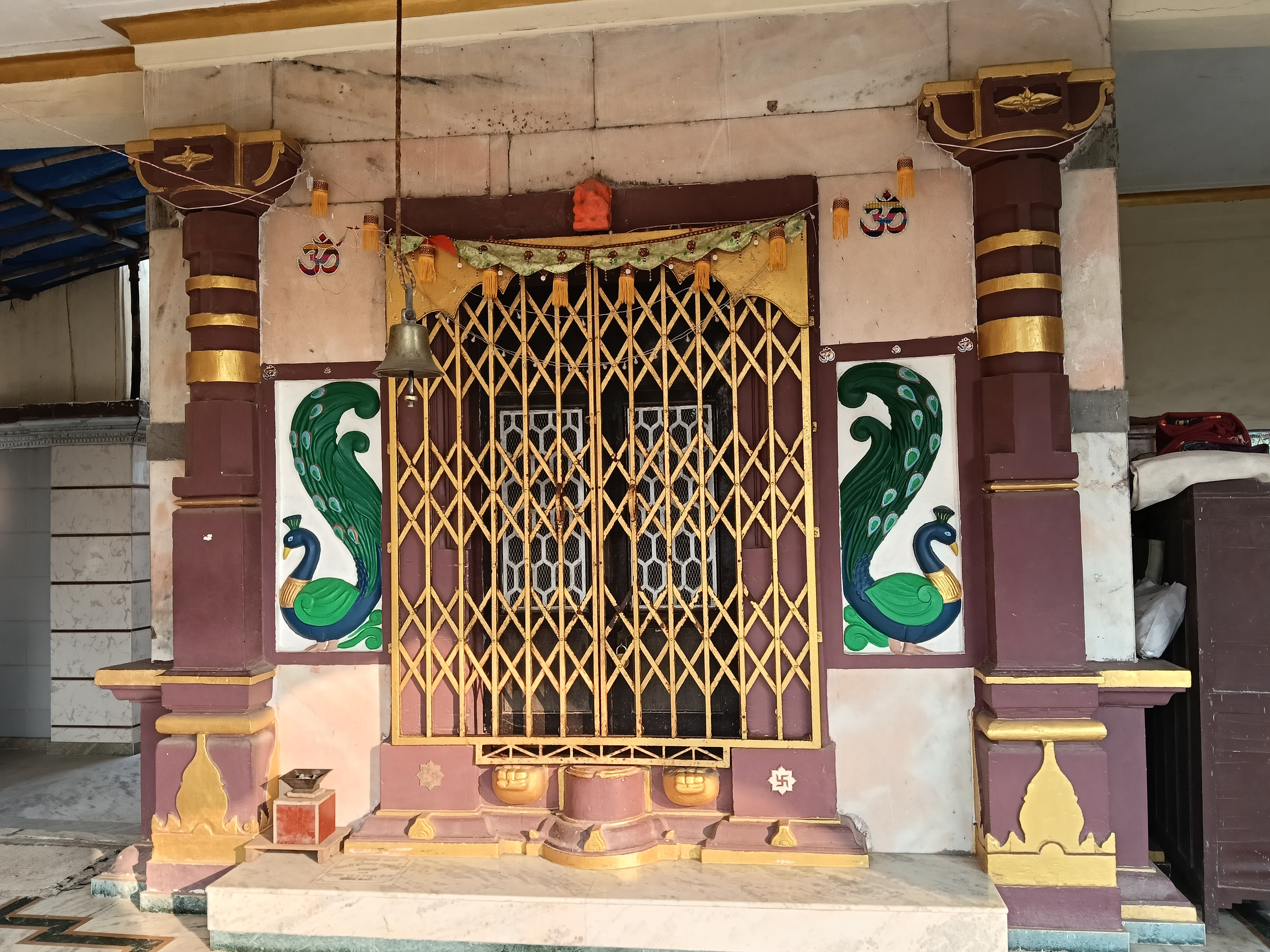
Garbhagriha of the Parshuram Mandir

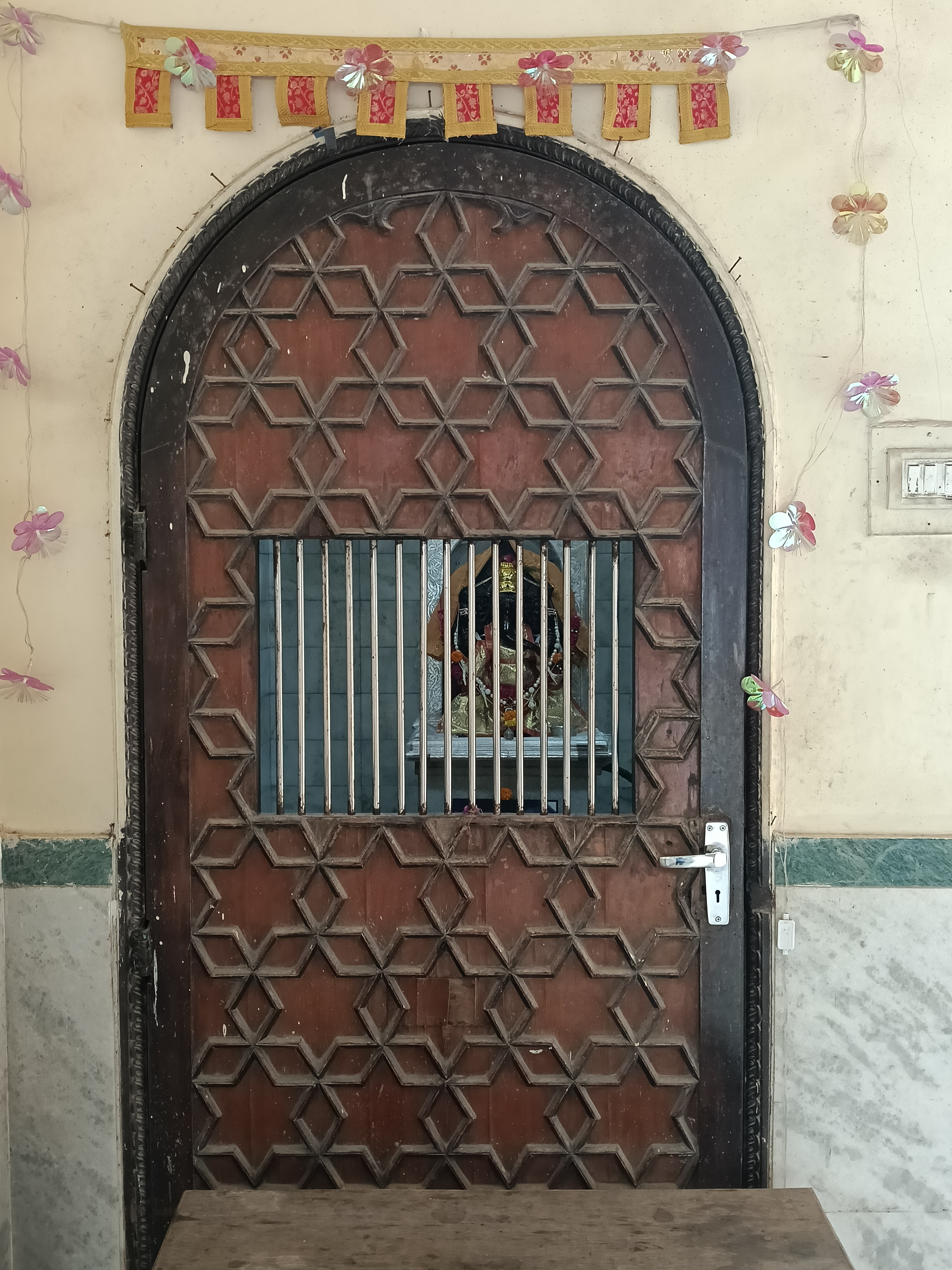
Lord Ganesha's Griha at Parshuram Mandir

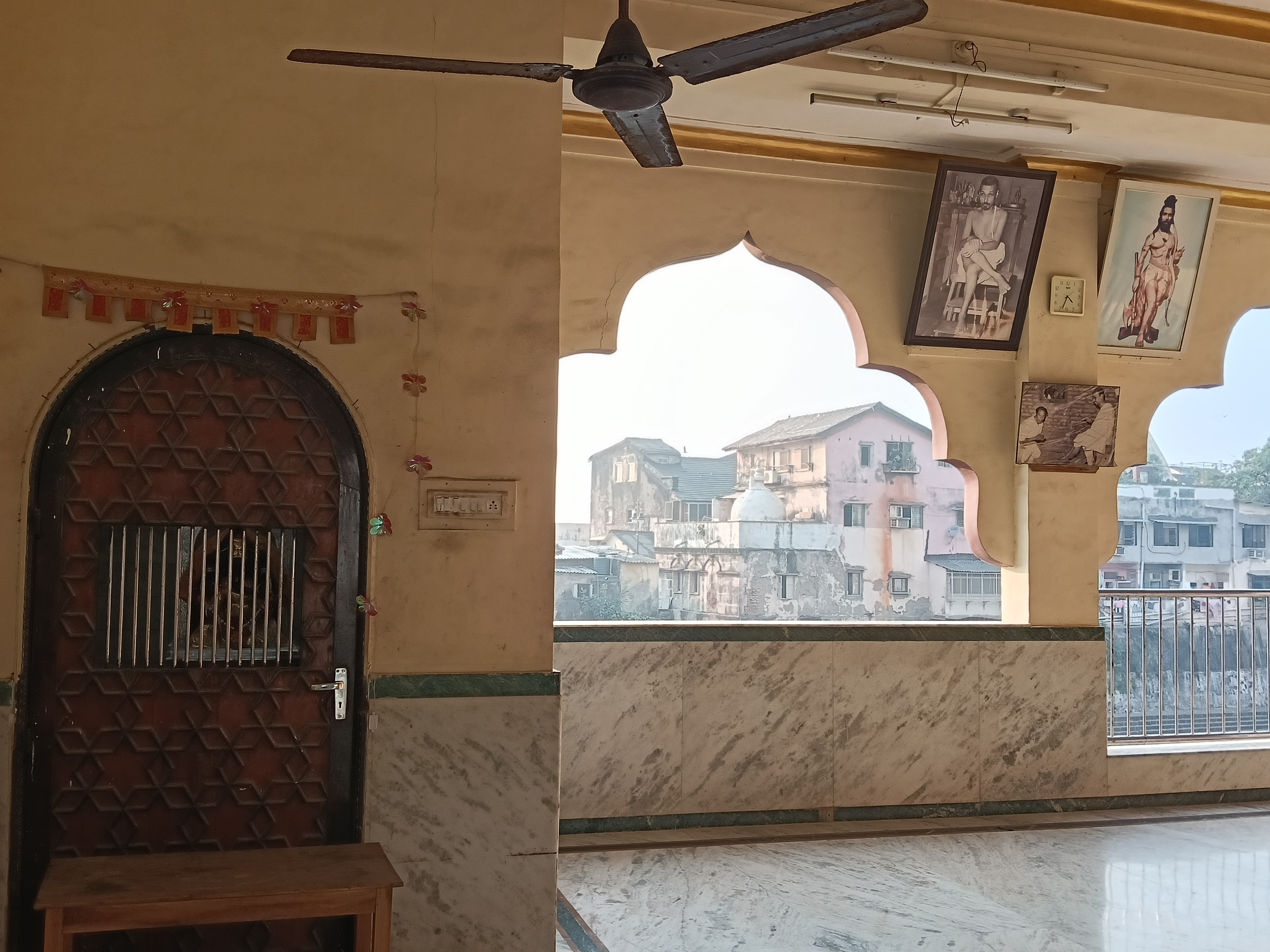
Inside of Parshuram Mandir

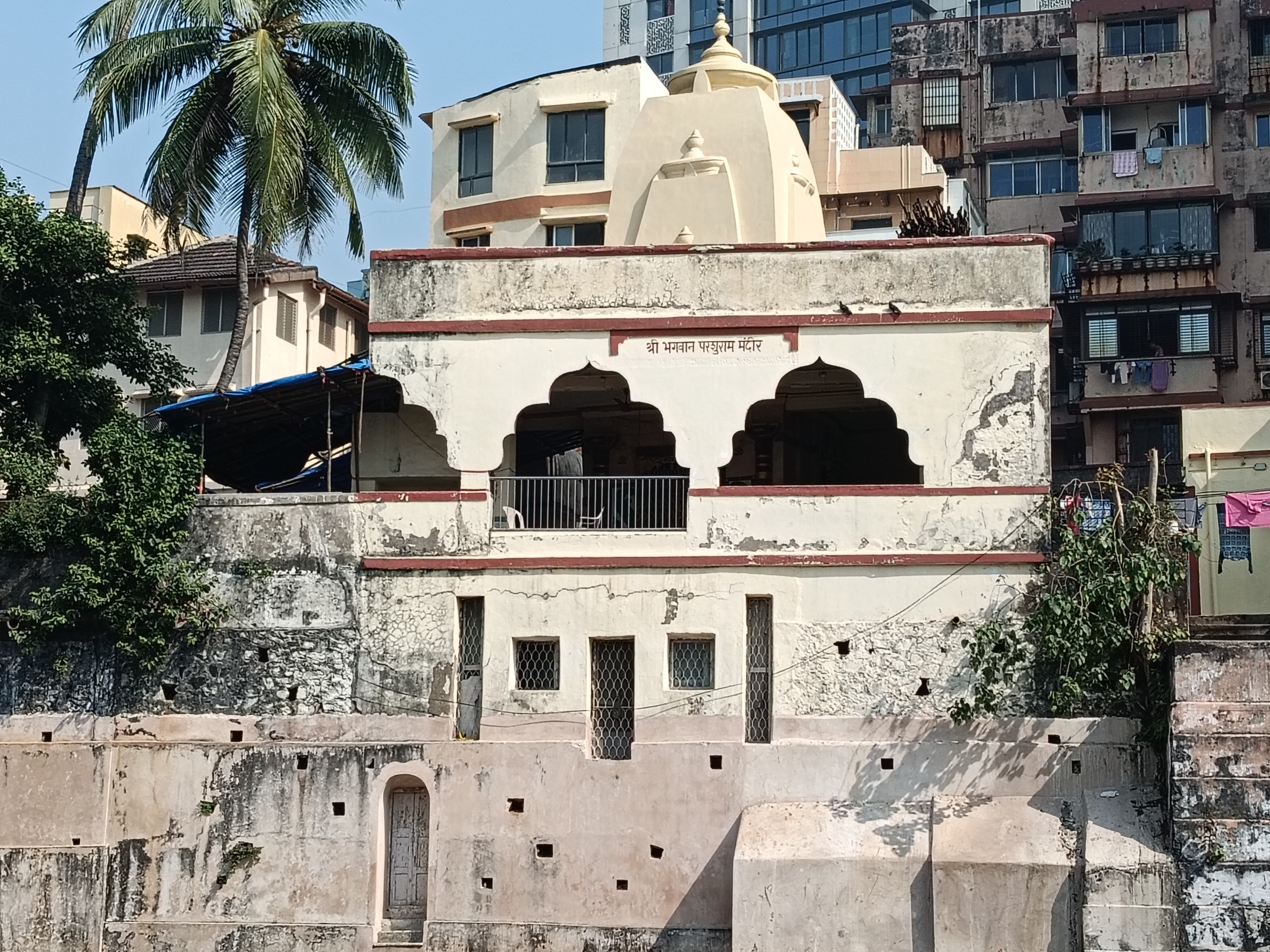

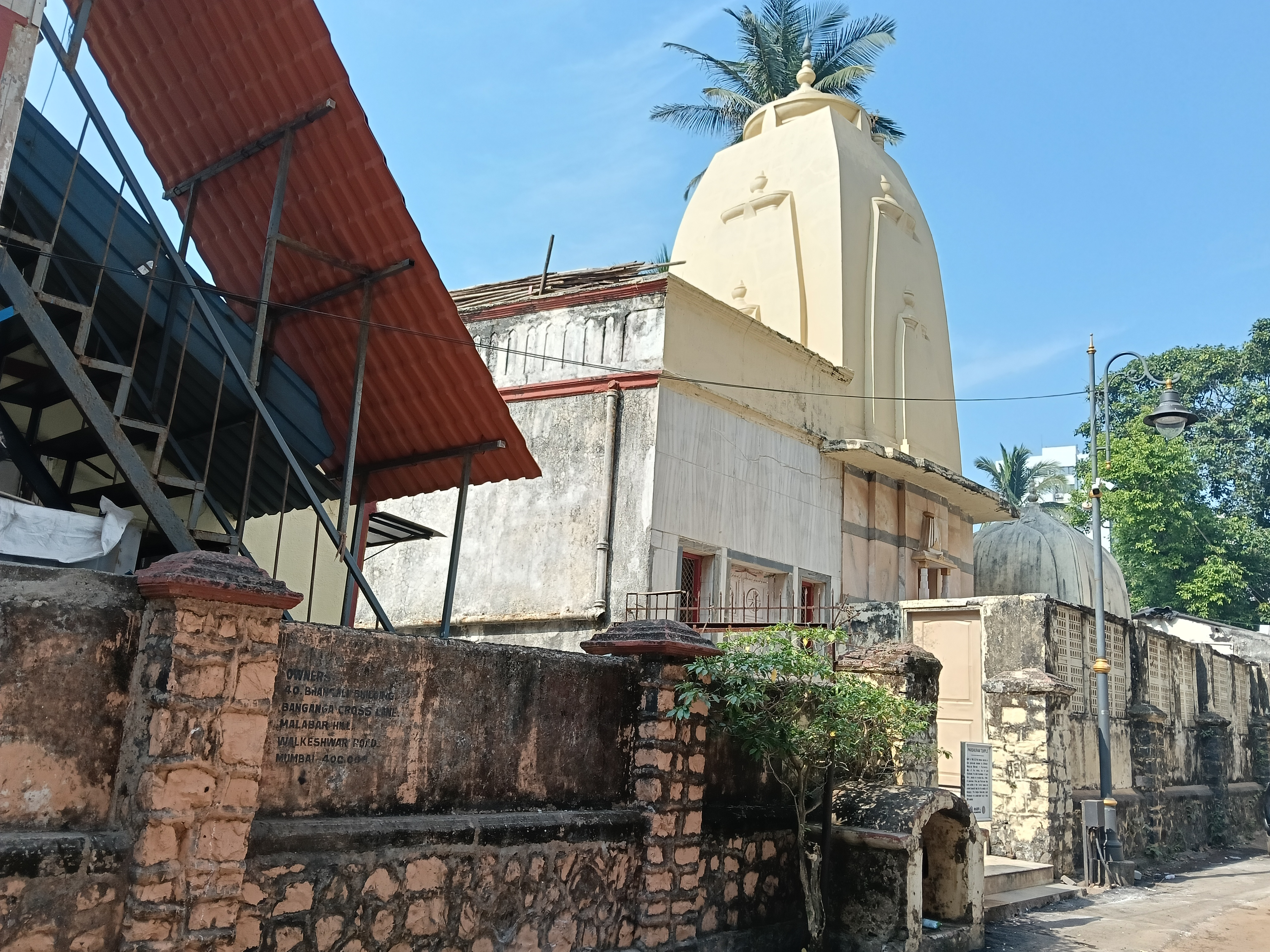

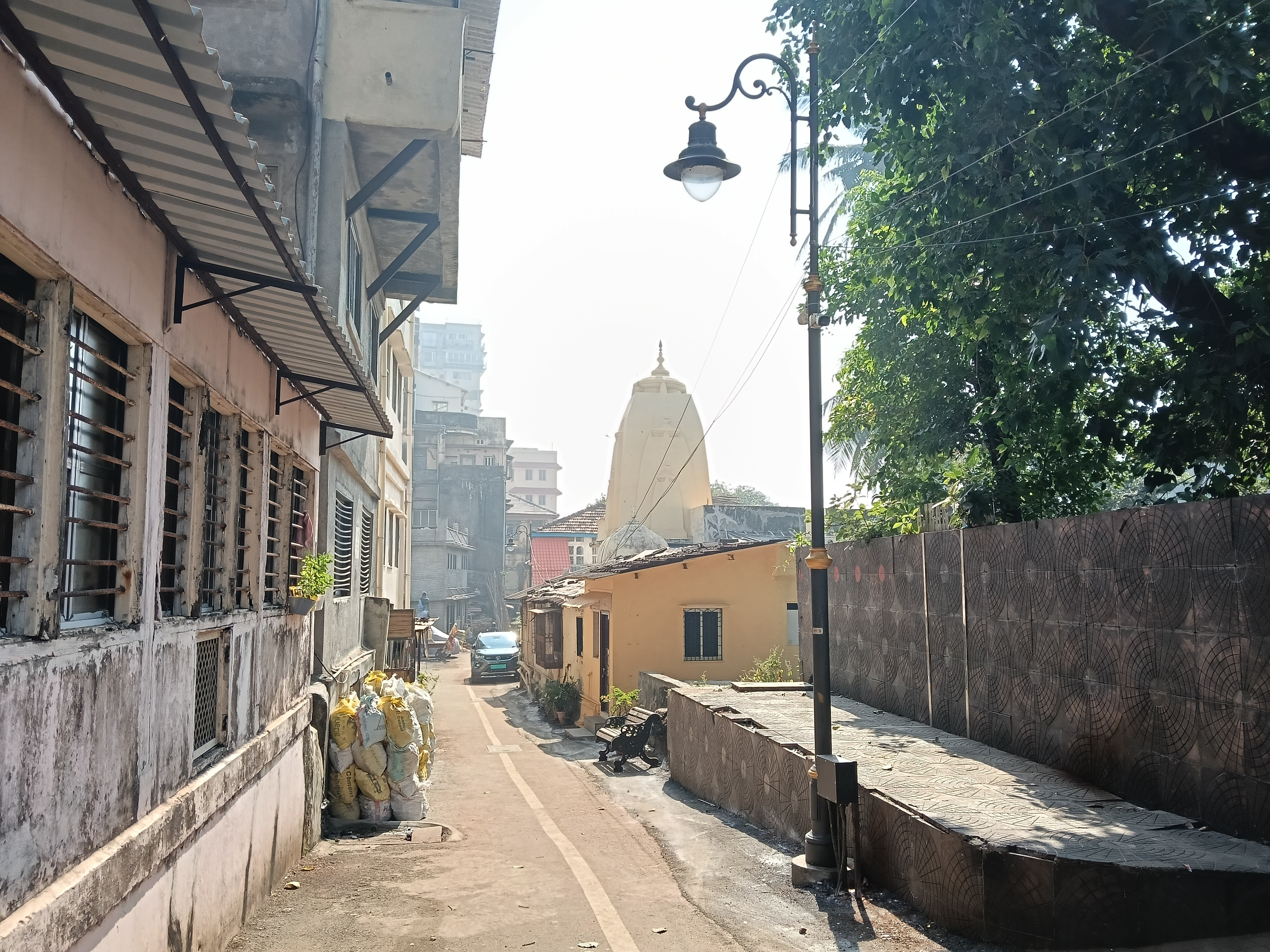
View of the Parshuram Mandir from some far distance
