= Lakshman Prabhu =

Lakshman Prabhu was a minister in the court of the Silhara dynasty that ruled the islands that today constitute the Indian city of Mumbai. He was Chandraseniya Kayastha Prabhu. He is known for overseeing the construction of the famous Walkeshwar Temple and the adjoining Banganga Tank in 1127 AD. The temple, later destroyed by the Portuguese, was rebuilt in 1711 in the South Mumbai precincts of Mumbai city by the financial help of a Gaud Saraswat Brahmin, Rama Kamat .
