= Baanganga =

Legendary ponds or rivers in the Indian subcontinent

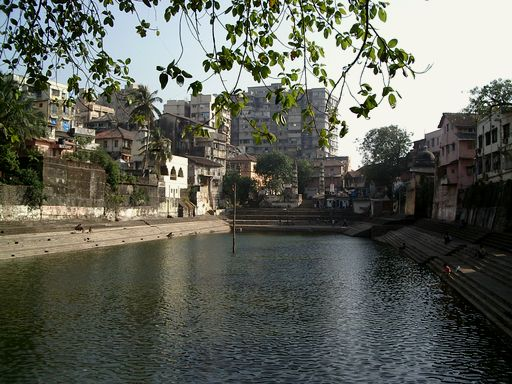
A sacred Banganga Tank at Walkeshwar Shiva Temple in the metropolitan city of Mumbai.

Baanganga (Sanskrit: बाणगंगा ) generally refers to the legendary ponds or rivers in the Indian subcontinent which had been created by shooting some divine arrows into the ground. These are tied to some legends of deities or divine figures in Hinduism shooting an arrow into the ground, resulting in the emergence of water that is considered as sacred as the Ganges River. According to legendary stories, there are several Bangangas in the different parts of the Indian subcontinent.

== Etymology ==
Baanganga is a Sanskrit word. It is the combination of the two Sanskrit terms Baan and Ganga. The literal meaning of the term Baan is an arrow. The term Ganga in Hinduism is used for denoting sacred water or the Ganga river. Thus the literal meaning of the combined term Baanganga is a sacred water body pierced by of an arrow.

== Description ==
One of the important Bangangas in the epic Mahabharata is located at Kurukshetra. It is related to the war of Mahabharata at the Kurukshetra battle ground. According to legend, when Arjuna came to know about the sacrifice of his brave son Abhimanyu trapped in a chakravyuh, he became very angry. In anger, he vowed to kill the Sindhu King Jayadratha. The next day, seeing Arjun's furious form, the great warriors trembled. It is said that whoever came in front of Arjun's chariot had to face defeat. He filled the battlefield with the dead bodies of the Kaurava armies by showering huge number of arrows. The atmosphere all around became very destructive. Due to running continuously in the fierce battle and getting injured by the arrows of the enemies, the horses of Arjun's chariot became agitated.

After that the horses slowed down. Then Arjuna asked Lord Krishna the reason for the slowness of the horses. Lord Krishna replied that the horses of had been distressed repeatedly due to being injured and tired. Then Arjuna told Lord Krishna to stop the chariot in the middle of the battlefield. After that he immediately built a chamber of protective wall around the chariot by piercing one arrow after another. Then Lord Krishna released the horses from the chariot in the protective chamber. After that Arjuna shot an arrow into the ground with his divine bow Gandiva and created a stream of water, due to which a pond was formed in the chamber. It is said that Lord Krishna bathed the horses with his own hands and gave them water. The wounds of the horses were cleaned. After bathing the horses, they were again harnessed to the chariot. Arjuna rode the chariot and proceeded to fulfill his purpose. According to legend, the water of Ganga was emerged with the arrow of Arjuna in the pond so this place is still known as Banganga.

Similarly, in the Mithila region of the present Bihar state, there is other important Baanganga at Baneshwar Sthan in the Madhubani district. According to the local legends, it is said that during the period of the Agyaata Vaasa there was a huge famine and water crisis in the region. Then Arjuna created a stream of Ganga from the earth with his Siki bow and arrow to protect the people of the region from the crisis of water due to the famine.

In the metropolitan city of Mumbai, there is an important location associated with the epic Ramayana. According to legend, it is said that after the kidnap of Goddess Sita by the demon King Ravana, Lord Rama and his brother Lakshmana were searching for Goddess Sita into the forest during their exile. When the both brothers reached at the spot, where the present Banganga Tank stands in the city, became very thirsty. Then Lord Rama shot an arrow into the earth here. As a result, a fountain of water emerged from the ground. It is believed that underground Ganga sprouted here underneath the earth. Since, the fountain of the water came forth due to piercing of an arrow, it came to be known as Banganga. On the bank of the Banganga Tank, Lord Rama also established a Shivalinga presently known as Walkeshwar Shiva. The temple of Walkeshwar Shiva is an important Hindu destination in the city of Mumbai.
