= Banganga Tank =

Ancient water tank in Mumbai

Coordinates: 18°56′48.78″N 72°47′36.93″E

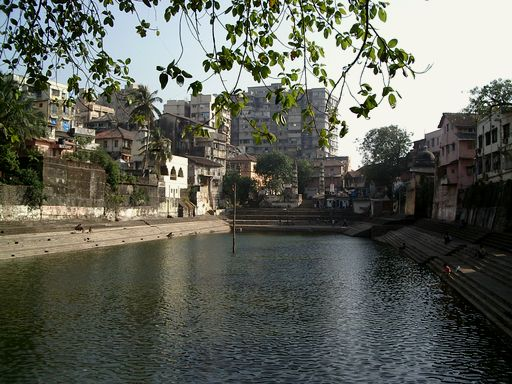
Banganga Tank in October 2006

The Banganga Tank is a temple tank which is part of the Hindu Walkeshwar Temple complex in the Malabar Hill area of the city of Mumbai, India.

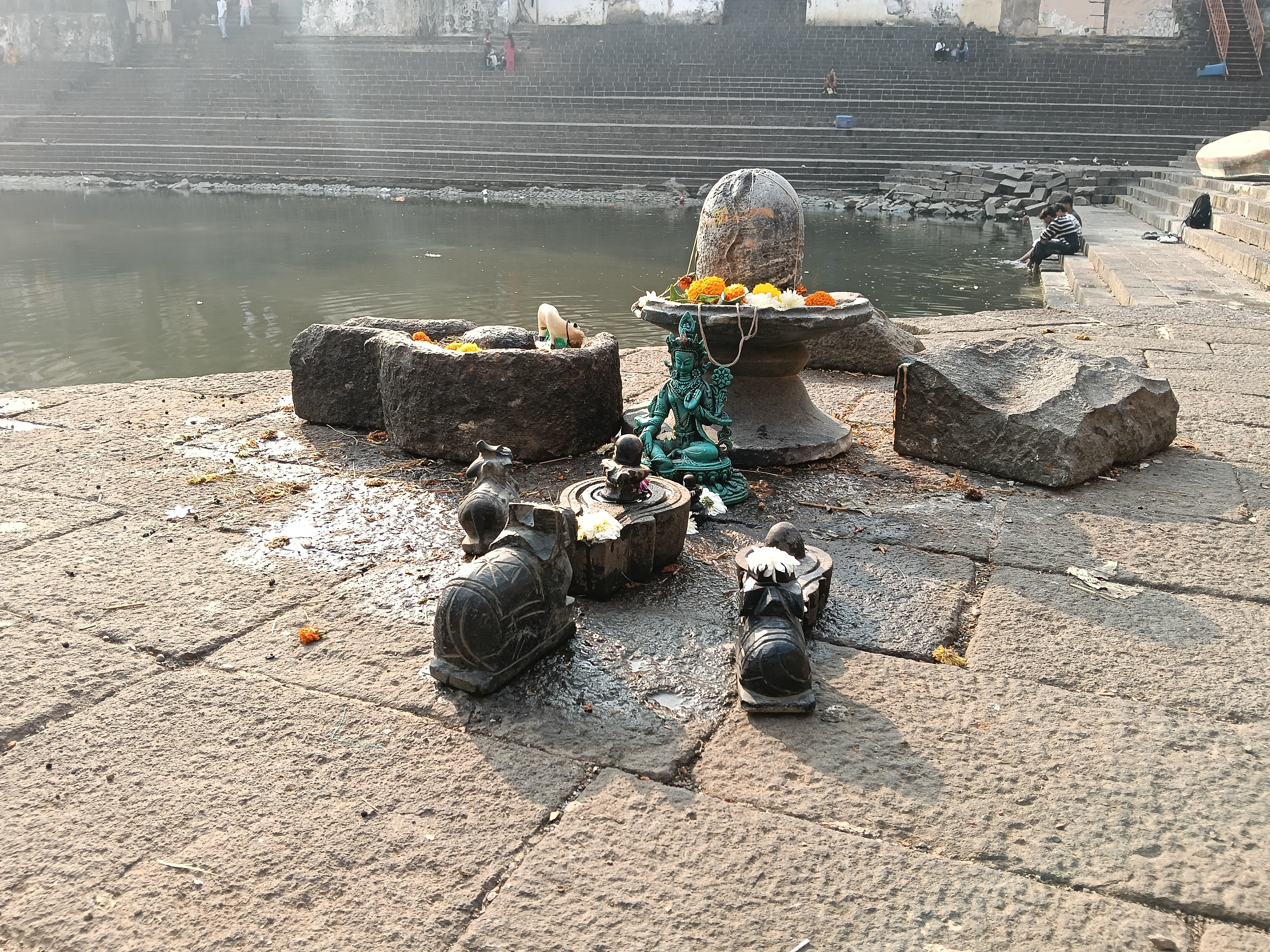
Ancient Shivalinga on the bank of the Banganga tank

== History ==
The tank was built in AD 1127 by Lakshman Prabhu, a minister in the court of Silhara kings of Thane.

It was rebuilt in 1715, funded by a donation from Rama Kamath. The main temple has since been reconstructed and is now a reinforced concrete structure of recent construction.

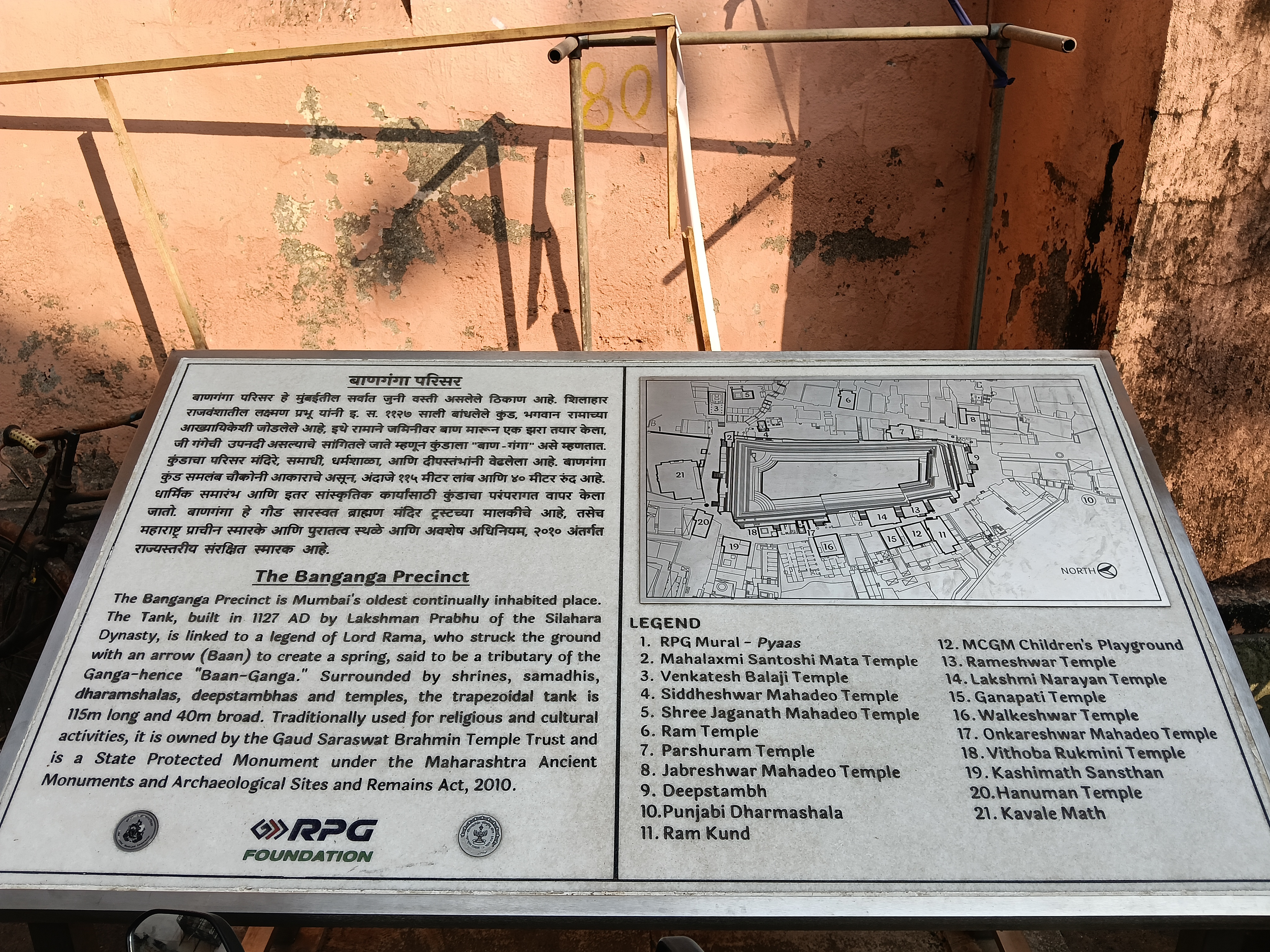
Banganga's Inscription Board, Walkeshwar

== Banganga in history ==
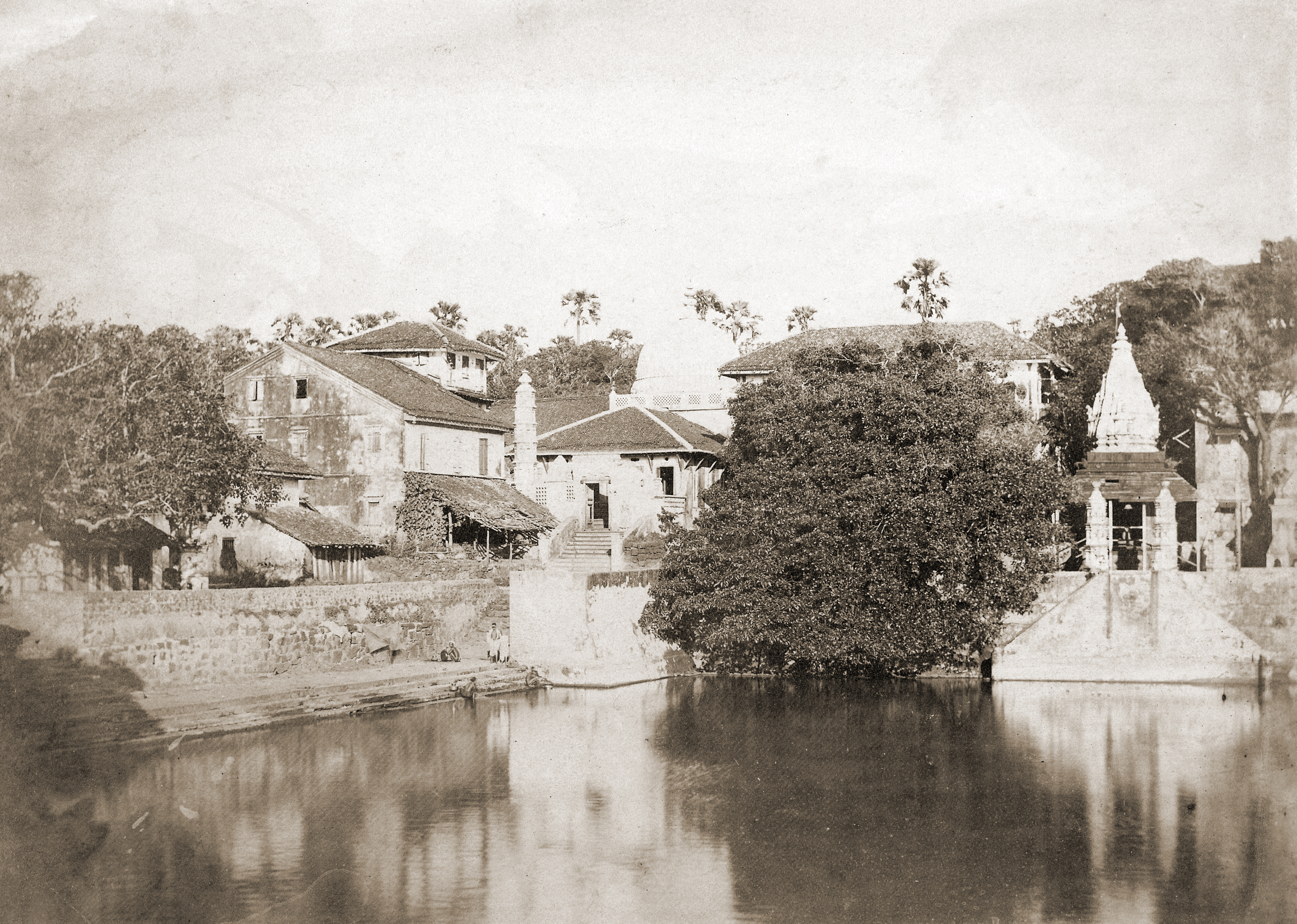
Banganga Tank and Walkeshwar Temple, c. 1855

According to local legend, the temple sprang forth when Rama, the exiled hero of the epic Ramayana, stopped at the spot in search of his kidnapped wife, Sita.

As the legend goes, overcome with fatigue and thirst, Rama asked his brother Lakshmana to bring him some water. Lakshmana instantly shot an arrow into the ground, and water gushed forth from the ground, creating a tributary of the Ganges, which flows over a thousand miles away – hence its name, Banganga, ie the Gaṇgā created by a bāṇa (arrow).

The Banganga also houses the Shri Kashi Math and Shri Kaivalya/Kavale Math of the Goud Saraswat Brahmins on its banks, including samadhis of the maths’ past heads.

The area also has a Hindu cremation ground which after 2003 received a makeover to house a gas crematorium.

The area still has an old Hindu cemetery consisting of samadhi shrines of various advaitin gurus, such as Siddharameshwar Maharaj (1888–1936) and his disciple, Ranjit Maharaj (1913–2000), Nisaragdatta Maharaj(1897-1981), Bhainath Maharaj (

== Present day ==
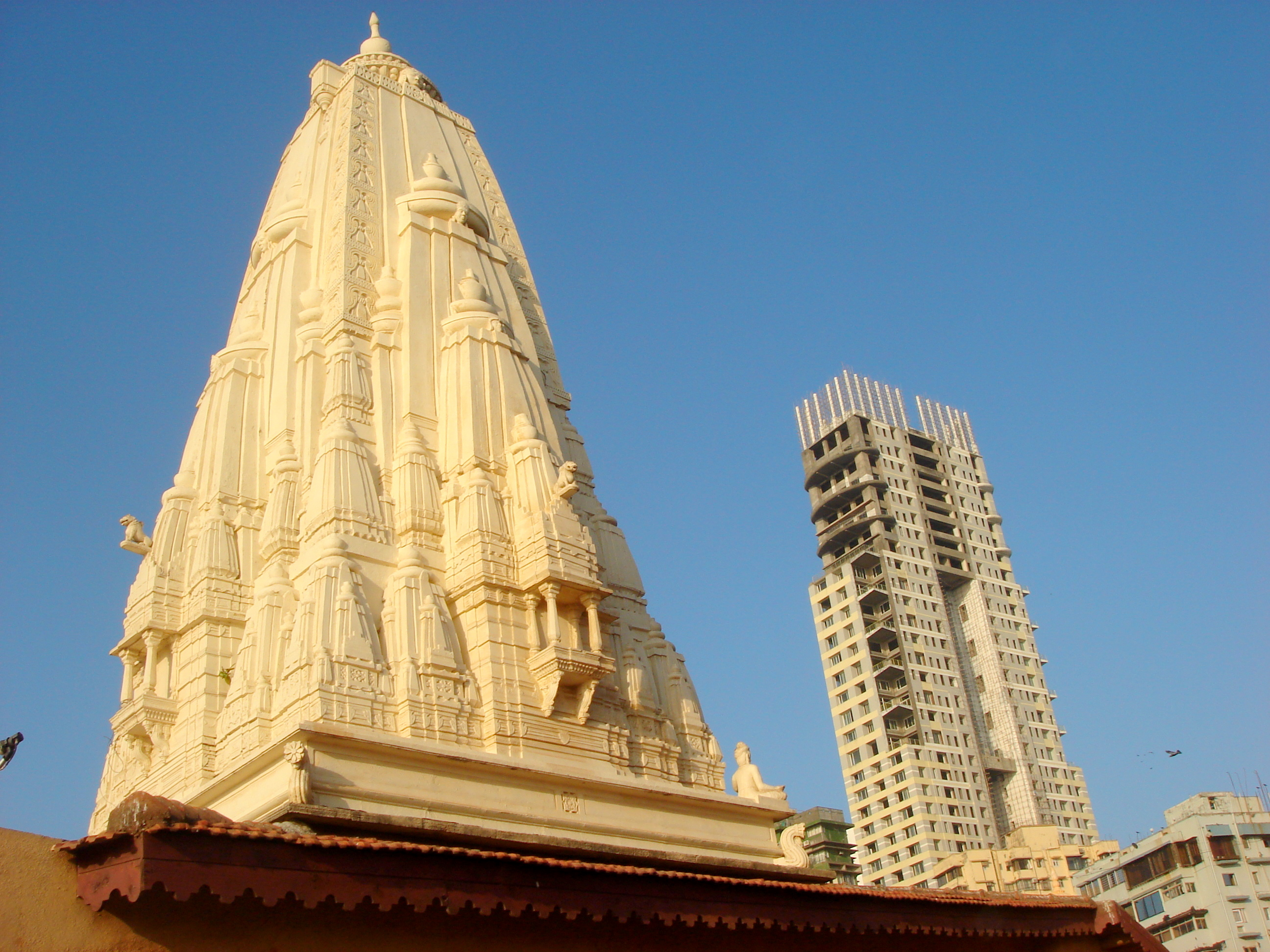
Shikhara of the Shri Kashi Math, as seen from Banganga Tank

The tank today is a rectangular pool structure surrounded by steps on all four sides. At the entrance are two pillars in which diyas (oil lamps) were lit in ancient times.

The tank, as well as the main Walkeshwar Temple and the Parshuram Temple, belong to the Goud Saraswat Temple Trust, which once owned most of the property in the complex. Many Goud Saraswat Brahmin families (Rege, Anaokar, Mulgaonkar, Kenkre, Sakhardande, Sukthankar, Keni, Marudkar, Naik, Wartikar, Warerkar, Bidikar, Bhende, Prabhawalkar, Pagnis) still reside in the Temple Trust buildings in the complex.

The tank is spring-fed; thus its water remains sweet, despite being located only a few dozen meters away from the sea.

Apart from being a cultural hub, the place over the years has provided inspiration to many artists, be it on film or on canvas.

In November, during Dev Diwali, a huge crowd of people light lamps at the Banganga tank, featuring bhajans and spiritual chants, dances and placing lamps (diyas) around the tank. Similarly, during the festival of Chhath Puja, a large number of Chhath vratis and devotees gathered here for offering Arghya to Lord Suryanarayana. The Banganga tank is one of the major locations in the city of Mumbai for Chhath Puja's grand celebration.
