= Walkeshwar Temple =

Ancient Hindu temple in Mumbai, India

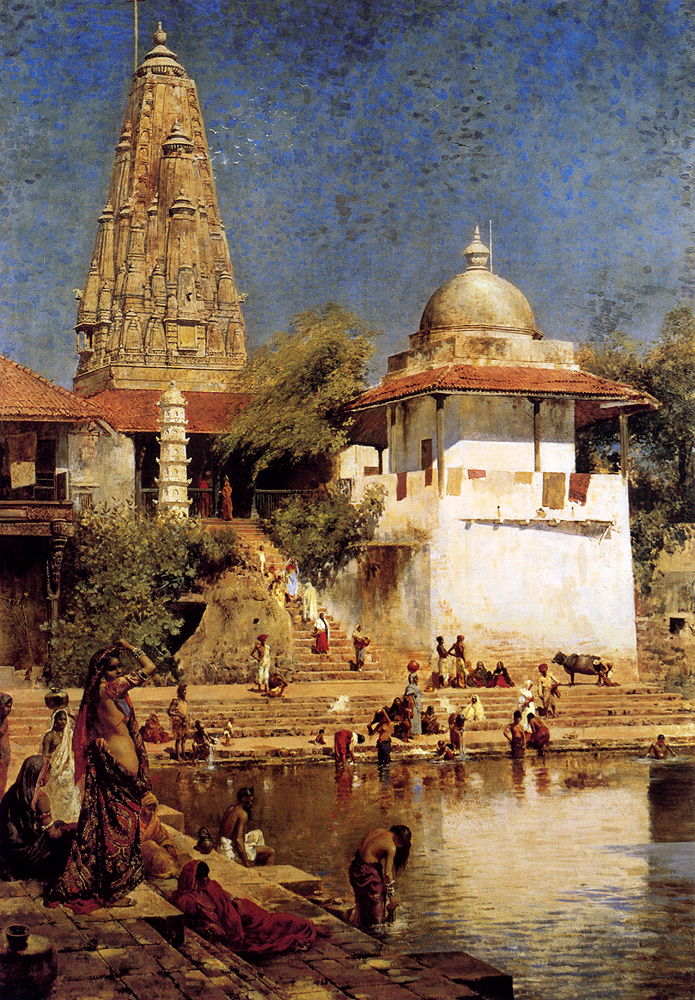
- The Temple and Tank of Walkeshwar at Bombay by Edwin Lord Weeks

- Walkeshwar temple in Mumbai Walkeshwar Temple (Maharashtra) Walkeshwar Temple (India)

Religion
- Affiliation: Hinduism
- Deity: Shiva

Location
- Location: Malabar Hill, Mumbai
- State: Maharashtra
- Country: India
- Interactive map of Walkeshwar Temple
- Coordinates: 18.945°N 72.794°E

Architecture
- Funded by: Lakshman Prabhu
- Completed: 1127

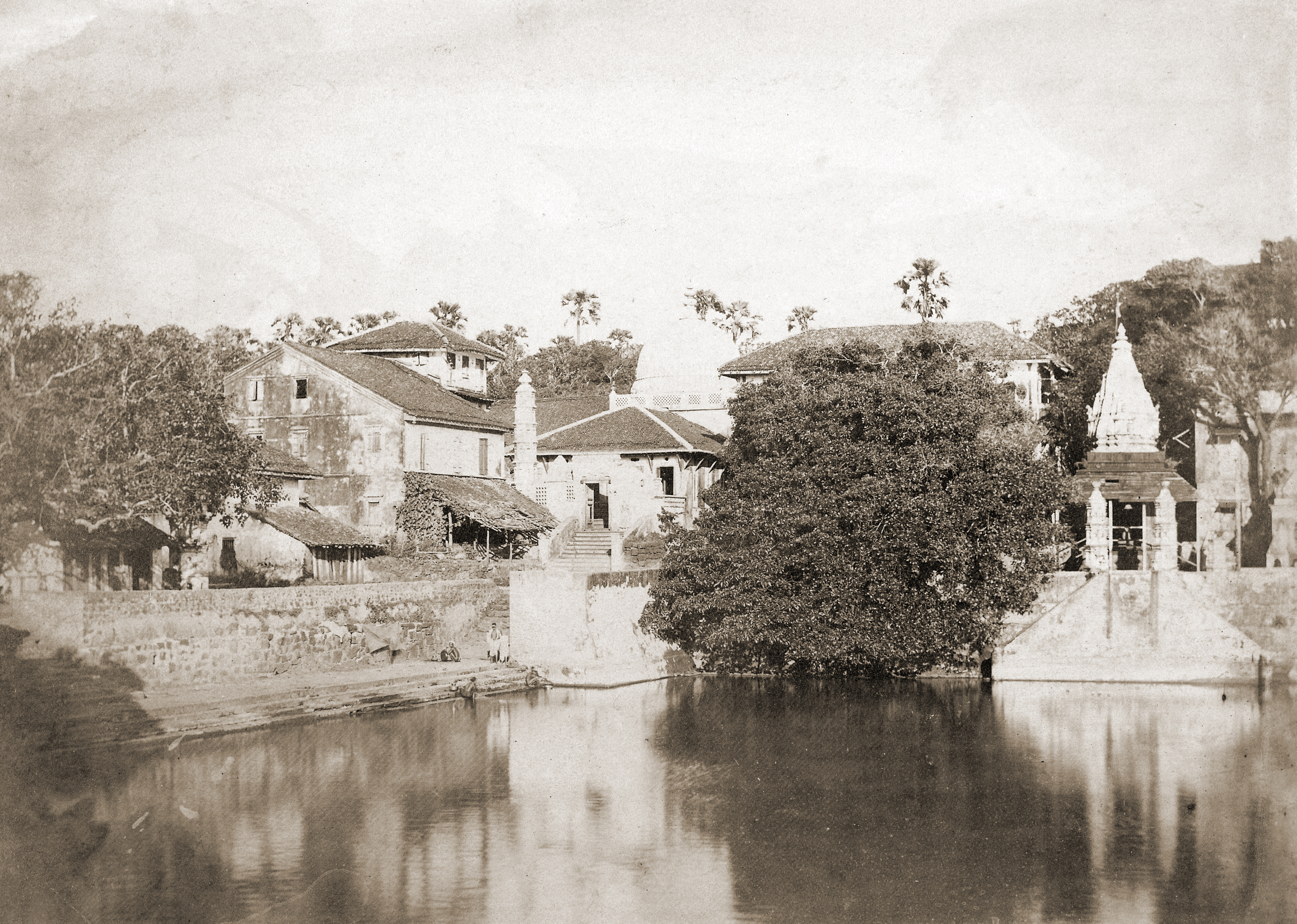
Banganga Tank and Walkeshwar Temple, Bombay, c. 1855.

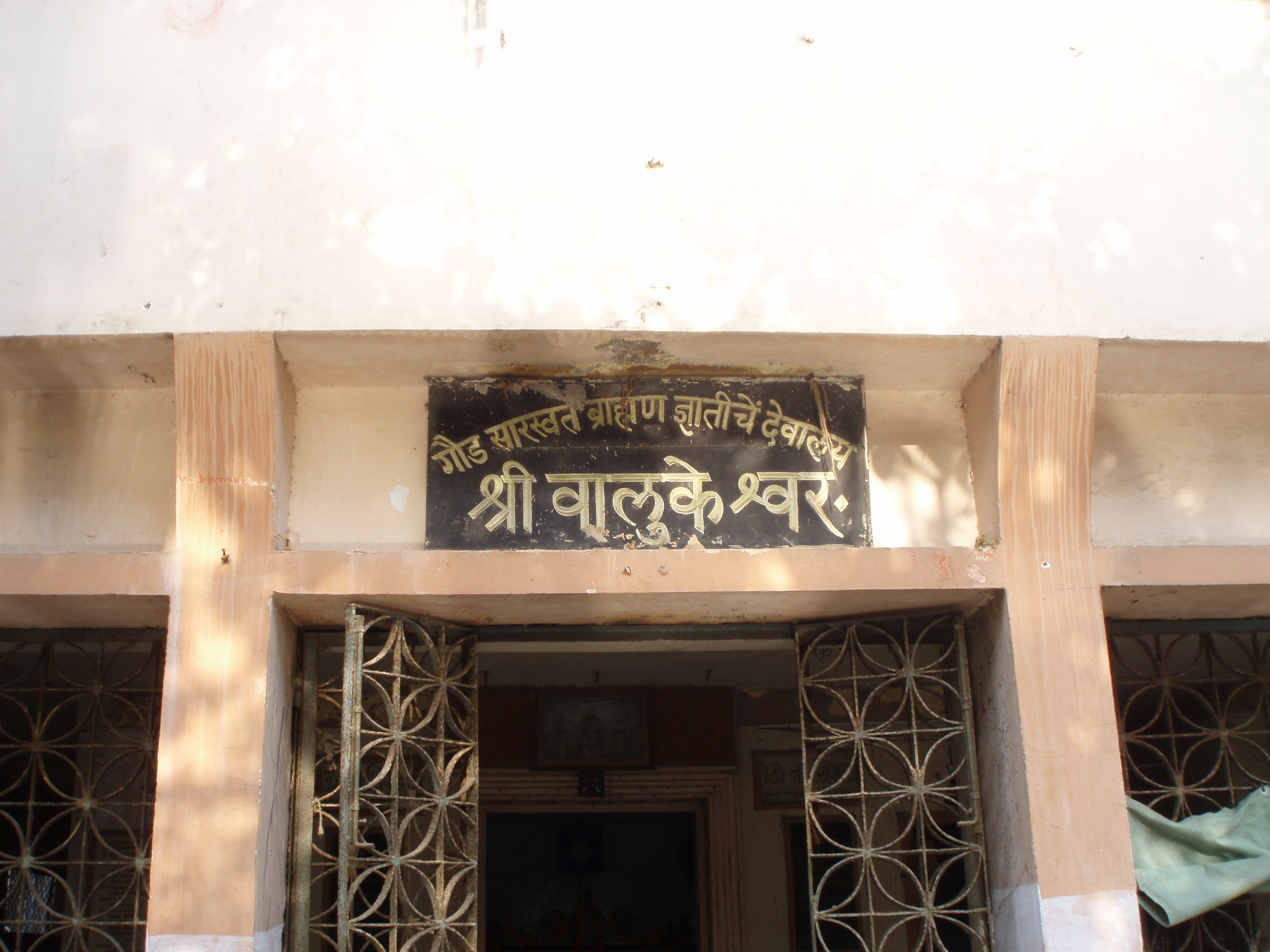
Gowd saraswat Brahmin Jatiche Devalaya Shree valukeshwar

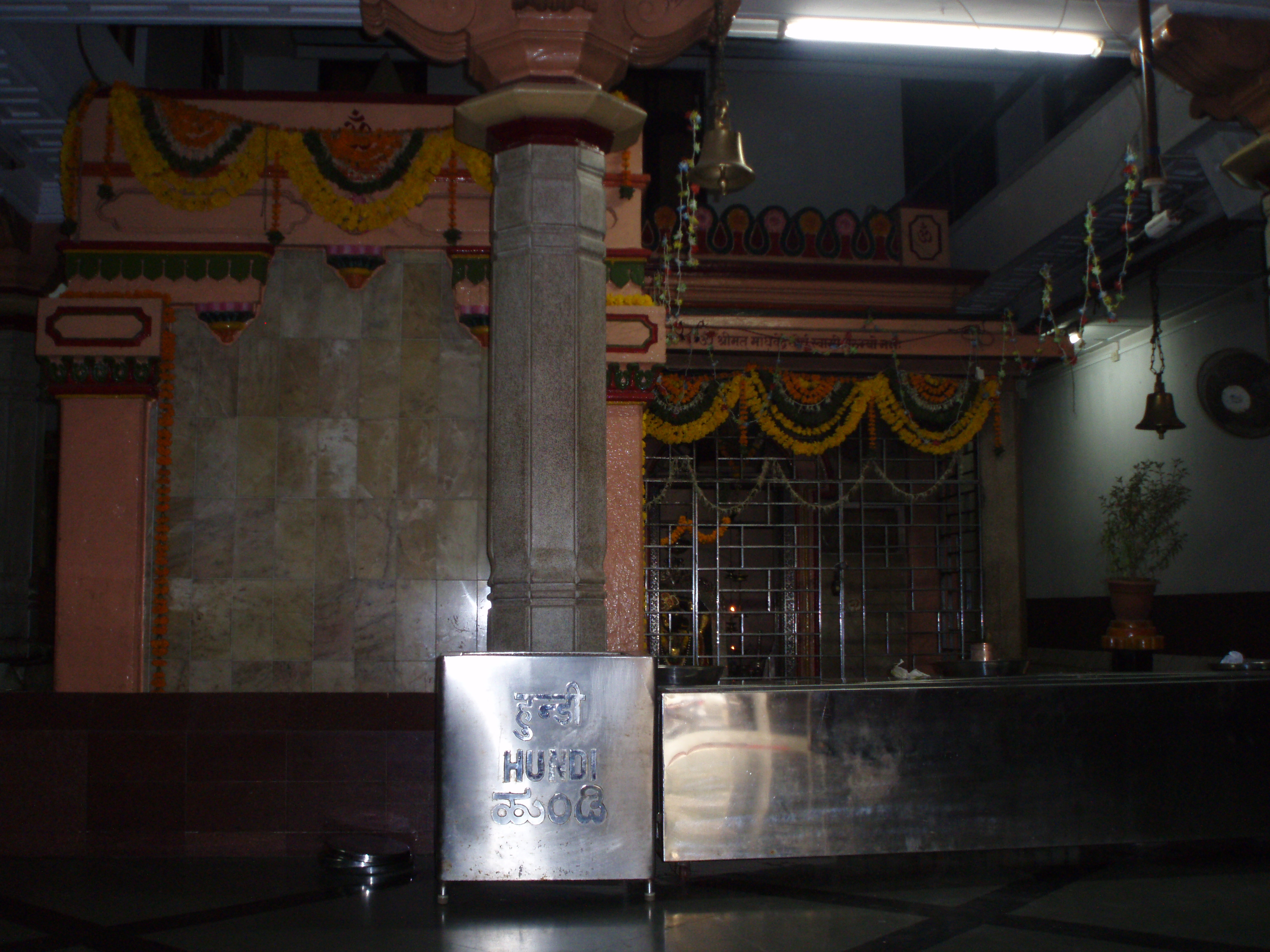
Kashi Math, Walkeshwar.

Walkeshwar Temple, also known as the (Baan Ganga Temple), is an Ancient Hindu temple, dedicated to Lord Shiva located in Walkeshwar, near Malabar Hill neighbourhood, in South Mumbai precinct of the city of Mumbai, India. It is situated at the highest point of the city, and close to the temple lies the Banganga Tank.

== Legend ==
Legend has it that the Hindu god, Rama paused at that spot on his way from Ayodhya to Lanka in pursuit of the demon king, Ravana who had kidnapped his wife, Sita. Then Lord Rama was advised to worship Shiva lingam and he is said to have constructed the original linga of sand, after getting tired of waiting for his brother, Lakshman to bring an idol. The name is etymologically derived from the Sanskrit word for an idol made of sand -- Valuka Iswar, an Avatar of Shiva.

As the story progresses, when Rama was thirsty, as there was no fresh water readily available (only sea water), he shot an arrow and brought Ganges over here. Hence Bana (arrow in Sanskrit) and Ganges in combination called Banganga. The water that feeds the tank stems from an underground spring at that spot, despite its proximity to the sea.

== History ==
The temple and the attached fresh water Banganga Tank were built in 1127 AD by Lakshman Prabhu, a Chandraseniya Kayastha Prabhu minister in the court of Silhara dynasty Kings who ruled Thane, and the islands of Mumbai during 810 to 1240 AD. The temple was destroyed by the Portuguese during their reign over Mumbai in the 16th century. It was rebuilt due to the generosity of Mumbai businessman and philanthropist, Rama Kamat, a Gaud Saraswat Brahmin (known in British records as 'Kamati') in 1715. The main temple has been substantially reconstructed and many smaller temples have come up around the Banganga Tank. By 1860, the temple started attracting greater crowds and 10 to 20 other temples had come up around it and 50 dharamshalas.

== Worship ==
The temple is generally busy every month only during the full moon, and at Amavasya (new moon). In the past, it was a favorite of the Malabar pirates who used to frequent the islands during the 16th and 17th centuries.

It is currently the site of an annual Hindustani classical music festival, which in 2005 featured musicians like classical singers Rajan and Sajan Mishra, and Santoor maestro Shivkumar Sharma. Branches of Shri Kavle Math and Shri Kashi Math, famous religious seats of Gaud Saraswat Brahmins, are located on the northern and western banks of the tank, respectively.

== Gallery ==
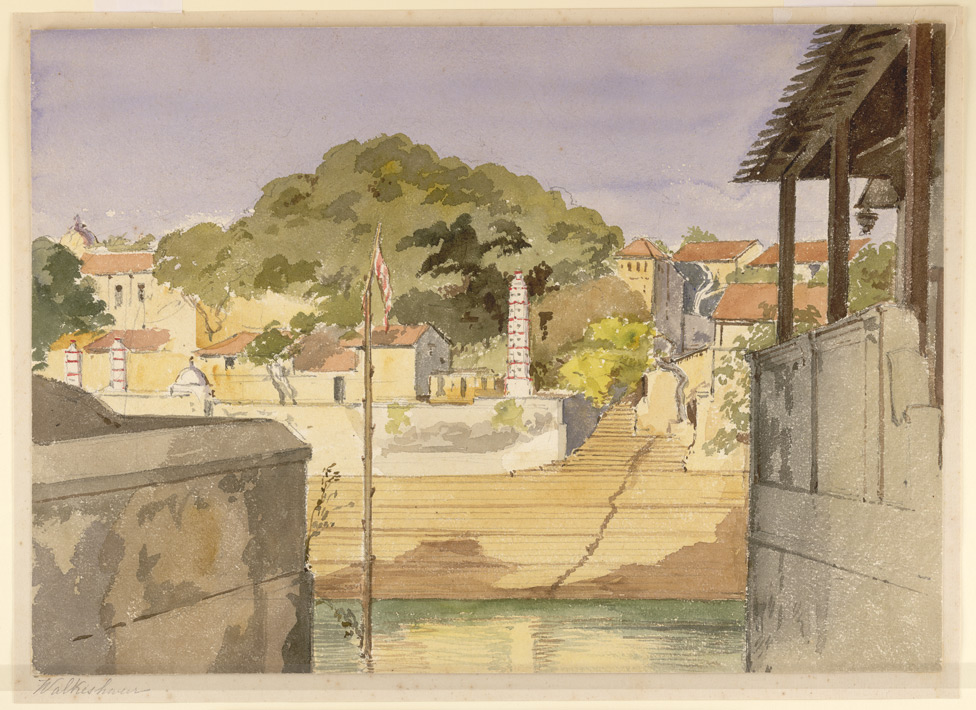
View of the ghat and ruined temple of Walkeshwar, 1850.

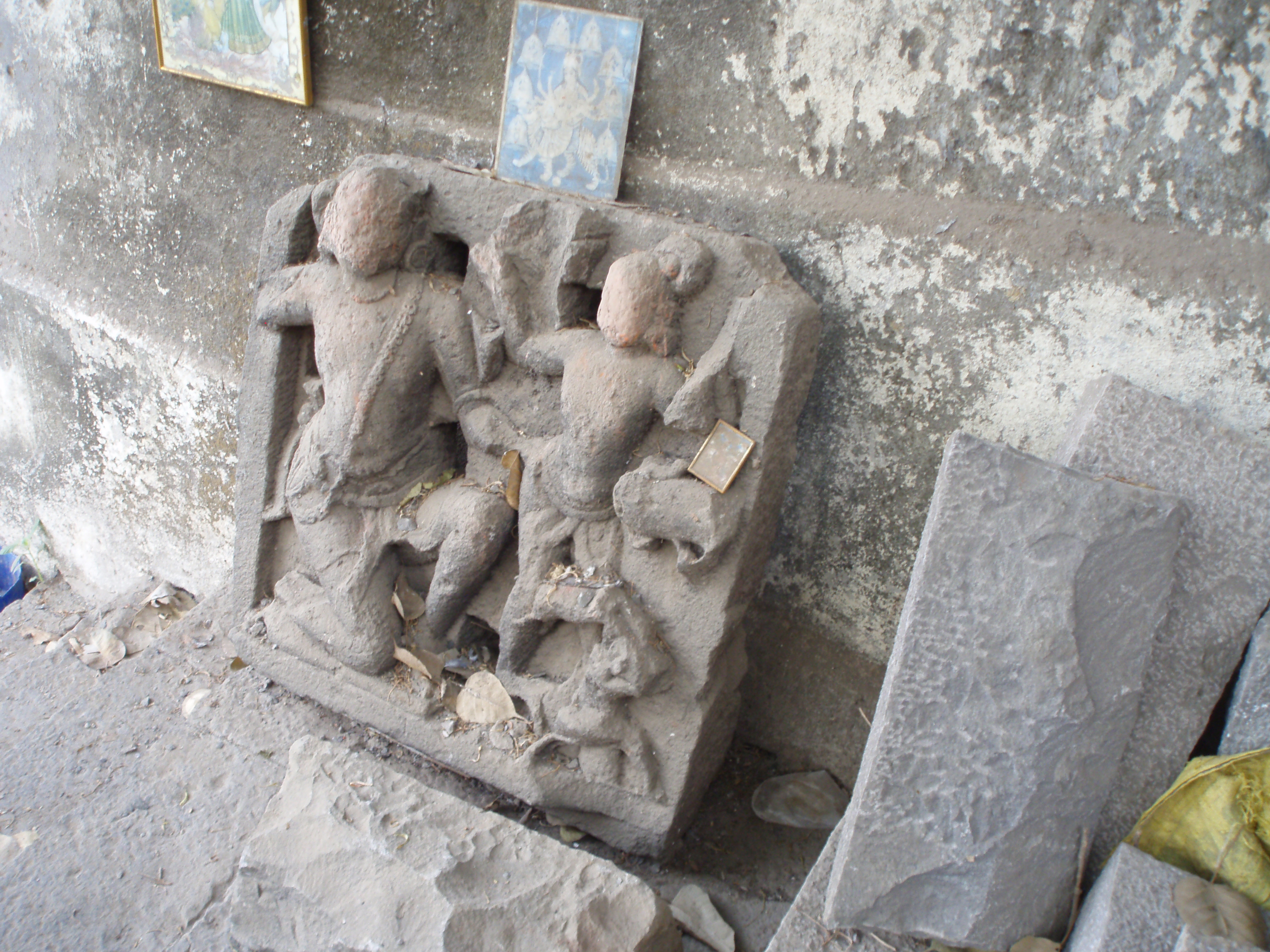
Ancient statues around Banganga Tank, Walkeshwar

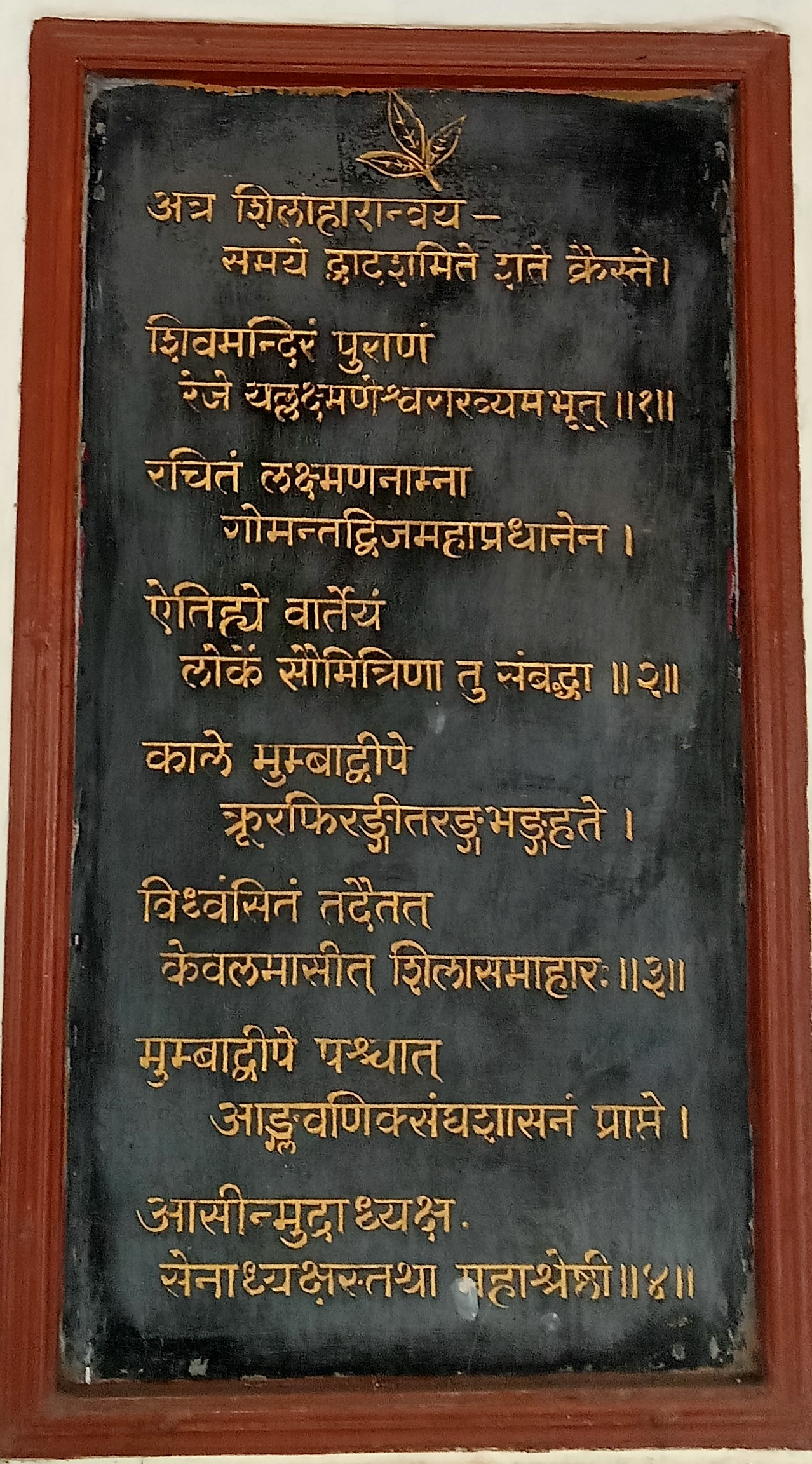
Walukeshwara History Inscription - 1

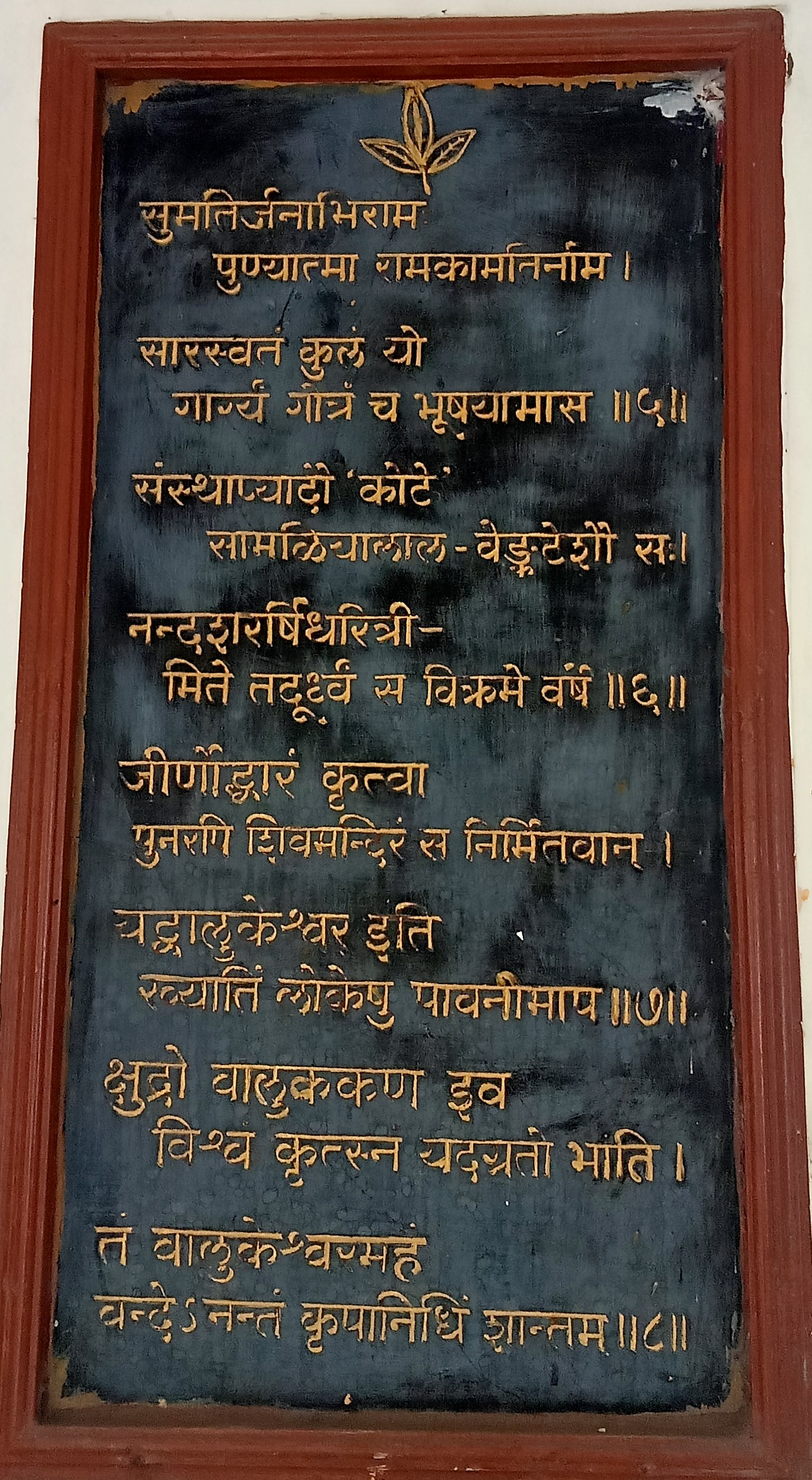
Walukeshwara History Inscription - 2
