= Rama Kamat =

Rama Kamat (died 1728) was a Mumbai (Bombay)-based businessman and philanthropist. The records of his life are scanty. He was connected with the command of Indian troops under the British and had some connections with Kanhoji Angre.

He paid for the reconstruction of the Walkeshwar Temple in 1715 and also donated a temple on Parsi Bazaar Street. He is on record as one of the honoured guests at the inauguration of St. Thomas' Cathedral on Christmas Day, 1718.

The governor, Charles Boone, found a piece of paper that said that Kamat was working with Boone's arch-enemy Kanhoji Angre. The paper was a forgery by one of Kamat's friends but Boone was so angry that he tortured and killed Kamat and then one day later learned that Kamat never helped Angre. Boone paid money to Kamat's family hoping for forgiveness.
