= Western Freeway =

Western Freeway may refer to:

== Roads ==
- Western Freeway (Victoria), Australia
- Western Freeway, Brisbane, Australia
- M4 Western Motorway, formerly named the Western Freeway, Sydney, Australia
- Western Freeway (Mumbai), India
- Western Freeway (Hampton Roads), Virginia, United States
- N3 Western Freeway, Durban, South Africa

== Music ==
- Under the Western Freeway, an album

== See also ==
- Western Expressway (disambiguation)
