= Worli-Haji Ali Sea Link =

Bridge in India

Worli-Haji Ali Sea Link (WHAL) वरळी हाजी अली सागरी सेतू
- Crosses: Mahim Bay
- Locale: Mumbai, Maharashtra, India

Characteristics
- Design: Viaducts
- Total length: 3.4 kilometres (2.1 mi)

Worli-Haji Ali Sea Link (WHAL) (Marathi: वरळी हाजी अली सागरी सेतू) is a proposed bridge with pre-stressed concrete viaduct approaches. It will link Worli to Haji Ali section over sea. It is part of a Western Freeway project.

If built, it will have the country's first cloverleaf interchange flyover built entirely over sea, and it would be the first project to be undertaken on a design-build-operate-transfer (DBOT) basis by MSRDC.

== History ==
On 28 June 2010, Maharashtra State Road Development Corporation (MSRDC) signed a contract with Reliance Sea Link One (RSLOPL), a consortium of Reliance Infrastructure and Hyundai Engineering and Construction to construct the Worli-Haji Ali Sea Link bridge. It was estimated to cost around ₹34.46 billion (US$390 million) to build. On 13 January 2011, Reliance Infrastructure received clearance to construct the sea link from the Ministry of Environment and Forests. Construction was expected to start in March 2011, with a completion date of June 2014. As of November 2015, the project has not been started and may be scrapped.

== Alternatives ==
The Haji Ali Mahalaxmi Project can be an alternative to the Worli-Haji Ali Sea Link. The Haji Ali Mahalaxmi Project aims to create a 6 Acres public open space. The proposal will not only benefit the millions of people who throng the Sea Face but also the people visiting the religious monuments of Mahalaxmi Temple and Haji Ali Dargah.

== See also ==
- Vikhroli-Koparkhairane Link Road
- Pamban Bridge
- Bandra–Worli Sea Link
