= Western Freeway (Mumbai) =

Road in India

Route information
- Length: 30 km (19 mi)

Major junctions
- From: Marine Drive
- To: Kandivli

Location
- Country: India
- States: Maharashtra
- Major cities: Mumbai

Highway system
- Roads in India; Expressways; National; State; Asian

The Western Freeway was a proposed controlled-access highway in Mumbai, India that would stretch from Marine Drive in South Mumbai to Kandivli in the north, a distance of 29 km. The project envisioned the construction of four major sea links over the Arabian Sea along Mumbai's western coastline to reduce traffic-congestion between the Western Suburbs and South Mumbai.

The first sea link, known as the Bandra–Worli Sea Link, was completed in June 2009, and connects Bandra in the north and Worli in the south with a cable-stayed bridge spanning the Mahim Bay. This development relieved congestion on the Mahim Causeway, which until then had been the only road between the Western Suburbs and South Mumbai on the western sea front. The second sea bridge, the Versova–Bandra Sea Link, is currently under construction and is expected to be completed by 2027.

In 2011, the Coastal Road was proposed as a lower-cost alternative to the Western Freeway. The 8-lane, 29.2-km long Coastal Road would run along Mumbai's western coastline connecting Marine Lines to Kandivali. The Coastal Road connects Marine Lines with the Worli end of the Bandra–Worli Sea Link through roads built on reclaimed land and tunnels rendering the proposed Haji Ali–Nariman Point Sea Link and Worli-Haji Ali Sea Link of the Western Freeway redundant. Construction of a 9.98 km section of the Coastal Road between Marine Lines and Worli began in 2018 and is expected to be completed by 2023.

== Haji Ali-Nariman Point Sea Link ==
This section would have been an extension of the sea-link from Haji Ali to Priyadarshini Park, and onward to Malabar Hill. The section was sub-divided into the following:

- Coastal road from north of Princess Street flyover. It would be a cut-and-cover tunnel which would connect to a bored tunnel under Malabar Hill. The tunnel will exit Napean Sea Road beyond Priyadarshini Park.
- From Priyadarshini Park till Mahalaxmi Temple. The committee has recommended a coastal road through reclamation.
- A coastal road, at Haji Ali Bay, through reclamation for an 8-lane road.
- A connector bridge running around the Haji Ali Dargah. This will connect the road to the north end of the Haji Ali Bay till the Baroda Palace Point.

On 16 April 2013, Chief Minister Prithviraj Chavan told the state Assembly that the Nariman Point–Haji Ali sea link was "impractical". Chavan stated, "As far as the sea link is concerned, the consultant had ruled out the possibility of taking it further than Haji Ali. We will look at other alternatives." Chavan also said that he would promote a coastal road as an alternative to the sea link.

== Worli–Haji Ali Section ==
This section is the immediate extension of the Bandra–Worli Sea Link further into the heart of Mumbai city. The current design allows for a clover leaf junction at Khan Abdul Ghaffar Khan Marg (at Worli) for ramp up of traffic onto the sea link. This includes twin carriageway of 3.315 km termed as main line and connectors at Worli and Haji Ali. While mainline is to be made of entirely precast segmental spans, the connectors will be made of segmental and I beams. A 10-lane toll plaza is proposed at the start of the section at Worli.

== Bandra–Worli Sea Link ==
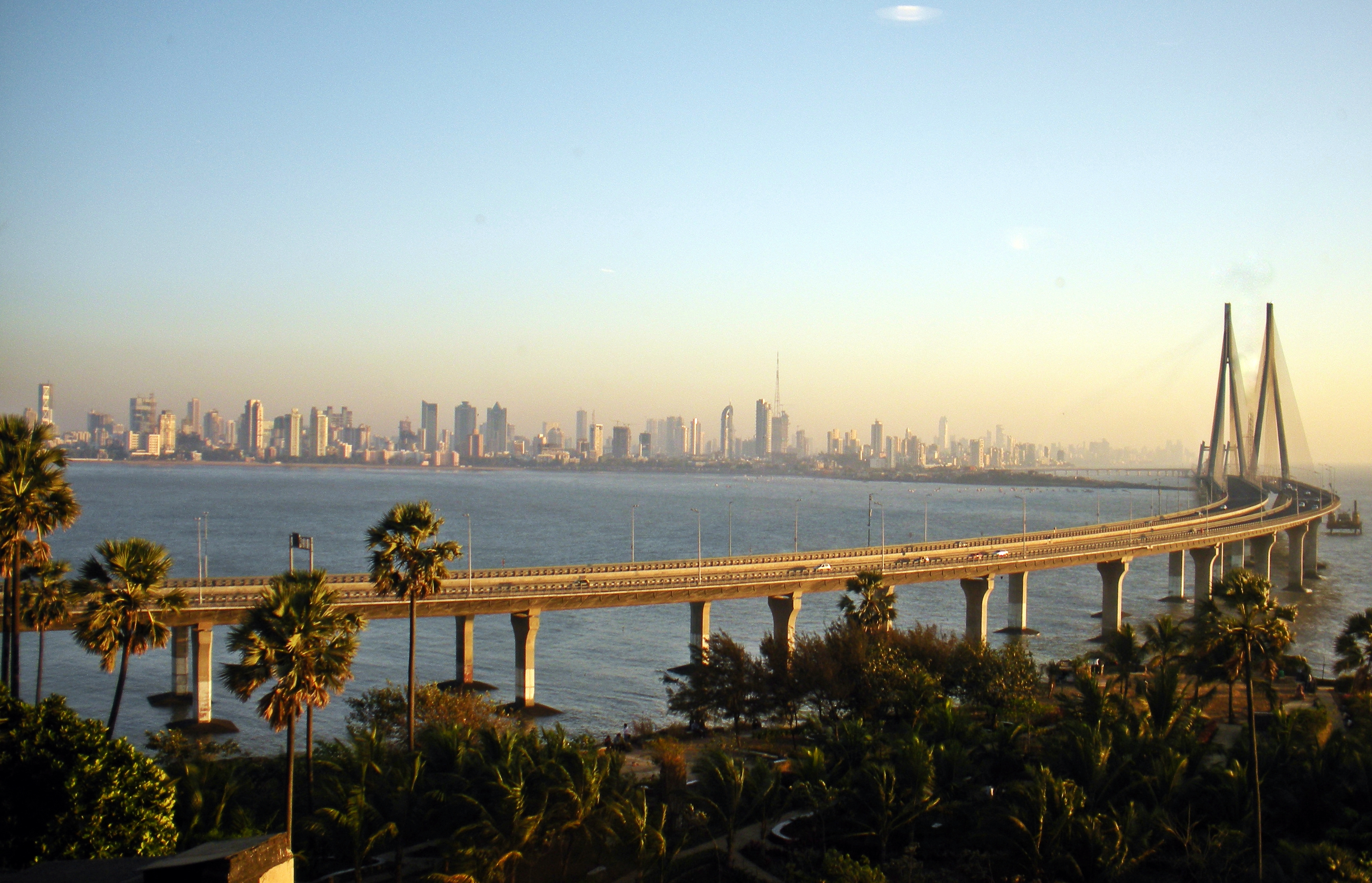
The Bandra-Worli Sea Link

The Bandra-Worli Sea Link was opened to traffic on 30 June 2009. The Sea Link reduces travel time between Bandra and Worli from 45 to 60 minutes to 7 minutes. The link has an average daily traffic of around 37,500 vehicles per day. The toll charged is ₹70 (83¢ US) for one-way and ₹105 (US$1.20) for a return journey.

There are plans to add an 800 m bridge to turn the Worli connector from a 4-lane to 8-lane freeway.

== Versova-Bandra Sea Link ==
The Versova-Bandra Sea Link (VBSL) is an under construction 9.6-km long sealink that connects Bandra with Versova. It is a northward extension of the Bandra-Worli Sea Link. The VBSL will be built on pillars 900 metres into the Arabian Sea. Juhu beach will have a 150-metre-long cable-stayed portion. The freeway should reduce congestion on the Western Express Highway and the Western Line of the Mumbai Suburban Railway. The 8-lane sea link will pass through Bandra, Juhu Koliwada, Versova and Carter Road.

The project will be developed through public private partnership on a design, build, finance, operate and transfer basis, The cost of the project was originally estimated as ₹4,045 crore (US$480 million) in 2012. This escalated to ₹4,340 crore (US$510 million) in 2013, it is currently estimated to cost ₹5,975 crore (US$710 million). The project is expected to be completed five years from its commencement.

The Versova-Bandra Sea Link received environmental clearance, under certain conditions, from the Ministry of Environment and Forests (MoEF) in January 2013.

A cabinet sub-committee on infrastructure chaired by Chief Minister Prithviraj Chavan cleared the project on 15 January 2014. Some observers felt that the move was an attempt to keep Nationalist Congress Party (NCP) happy prior to the 2014 Lok Sabha elections, as this project and the Pune Ring Road project which was also approved the sub-committee, would be undertaken by the MSRDC, which was then headed by the NCP. The project had been pending for approval for the past three years. The fate of the sealink had been uncertain after Chavan said that coastal roads were less expensive to build. Chavan stated that he also favoured coastal roads because they had less environmental hurdles than a sealink. BMC officials stated that the government had not clarified the future of the coastal road project, after approving the VBSL.

The MSRDC invited request for qualification (RFQ) from companies interested in constructing the VBSL on 2 March 2014. The agency conducted a pre-bid conference for potential bidders on 28 March. The last date for the submission of technical bids was fixed as 30 May, and the MSRDC plans to open technical bids on 31 May, as per the tender notice. The MSRDC estimated that the project concession period to be 35 years in the absence of any viability gap funding (the state's financial contribution in a PPP project). However, after some members of the infrastructure sub-committee expressed reservations about the long concession period, the corporation decided to seek 20% from the Union government, which the MSRDC estimates will reduce the concession period to about 28–30 years.

=== History ===
In its report, submitted in January 2012, the Joint Technical Committee advised the government to build a 35.6 km coastal freeway from Manora MLA Hostel at Nariman Point to Kandivali. The project is estimated to cost ₹ 10,000 crore.

Coastal Regulation Zone (CRZ) norms in India disallow reclamation of land. Construction of the coastal freeway would require a relaxation of the CRZ norms, as certain sections are proposed on reclaimed land. The change in norms can only be done through an amendment to the law by the Central Government. During a meeting between Prithviraj Chavan and Union environment minister Jayanthi Natarajan on 20 June 2013, Natarajan expressed concerns about the implications of relaxing CRZ norms, on creeks and mangroves. However, the minister stated that she would "put the state's proposal at the next meeting [24 June 2013] of the National Coastal Zone Management Authority". However, despite specific assurance from the minister, the National Coastal Zone Management Authority (NCZMA) decided not to include the coastal road plan in their next meeting's agenda.

== Coastal Freeway ==
The Coastal Freeway is a proposed alternative to the Western Freeway. The 29.2-km freeway is proposed to run along Mumbai's western coastline connecting Marine Lines in the south to Kandivli in the north. The estimated cost of the project is ₹14,000 crore (US$1.7 billion). In the first phase of the project, the road will connect Princess Street and the Bandra-Worli Sea Link, and is expected be completed by 2019. A tunnel beginning at Chowpatty will link to Priyadarshini park, after which the coastal road will pass through the Bandra-Worli Sea Link. Work on the second phase, a sea link between Bandra and Kandivali, will begin after the completion of the first phase. A further extension of the road to Vasai-Virar has also been proposed.

=== History ===
In 2011, Chief Minister Prithviraj Chavan asked the MSRDC to think of building coastal roads instead of capital intensive sea links. He appointed a Joint Technical Committee, comprising experts and officials, in 2012 under the then Municipal commissioner Subodh Kumar to study the plan to build a coastal road. In its report, submitted in January 2012, the committee advised the government to build a 35.6 km coastal freeway from Manora MLA Hostel at Nariman Point to Kandivali to ease traffic congestion. The project was estimated to cost ₹ 10,000 crore and would have consisted of roads built on reclaimed land as well as stilts, bridges and tunnels. The committee was against building any more sea links and pointed out that the coastal road would help save ₹ 120 billion of public money. The 35.6 km road was proposed to begin near Manora (MLA Hostel), with entry and exit points at Jagannath Bhosale Marg, move along Marine Drive and lead into a tunnel that would go under Malabar Hill and exit on the other side of Priyadarshini Park. This stretch was proposed to be built on reclaimed portions up to Haji Ali, and then to Lala Lajpatrai Road in Worli. The coastal freeway would then be connected to the Worli arm of the Bandra-Worli Sea Link by a bridge. On the Bandra side, the coastal road skirting the fort would connect the coastal freeway up to Chimbai village, where a bridge was proposed. A road by reclamation of mangroves, further north, or a road on stilts, and an elevated road between Oshiwara and Malad was also proposed. The proposed freeway would have had 18 entry and exit points along its route. The project is estimated to cost ₹ 8,000-10,000 crore, and take 5 years to complete. Critics of the freeway opposed it due to the reclamation required and have also cited possible environmental degradation along the coast.

Coastal Regulation Zone (CRZ) norms in India disallow reclamation of land. Construction of the coastal freeway would require a relaxation of the CRZ norms, as certain sections are proposed on reclaimed land. The change in norms can only be done through an amendment to the law by the Central Government. After discussing the project on 10 April 2013, the Maharashtra coastal zone management authority (MCZMA), the state's apex environment body, urged the centre to amend the CRZ notification to permit "reclamation for roads". The MCZMA stated that reclamation should not be permitted for any other development activity and that the high tide line must not be altered. The MCZMA also argued that the ring road would serve as a protection wall from inland flooding, besides being a vital road link for decongesting traffic. During a meeting between Prithviraj Chavan and Union environment minister Jayanthi Natarajan on 20 June 2013, Natarajan expressed concerns about the implications of relaxing CRZ norms, on creeks and mangroves. However, the minister stated that she would "put the state's proposal at the next meeting [24 June 2013] of the National Coastal Zone Management Authority". However, despite specific assurance from the minister, the National Coastal Zone Management Authority (NCZMA) decided not to include the coastal road plan in their next meeting's agenda.

During the 2014 assembly elections, the BJP promised to implement the project if elected. On 6 June 2015, the State Government signed an MoU with the Dutch Government for technical co-operation in implementing the project. The Netherlands is known for its environment-friendly reclamation and the use of the sea. On 8 June 2015, the coastal road project received clearance from the Union Ministry of Environment and Forests.

Initial work on the project began on 26 November 2016. Shiv Sena president Uddhav Thackeray stated that a survey of the soil at the seabed was being undertaken. The foundation stone for the project for the coastal road project is scheduled for monsoon 2017.
