= Coastal Road (Mumbai) =

Freeway in Mumbai, Maharashtra, India

- Dharamveer Swarajya Rakshak Chhatrapati Sambhaji Maharaj Mumbai Coastal Road
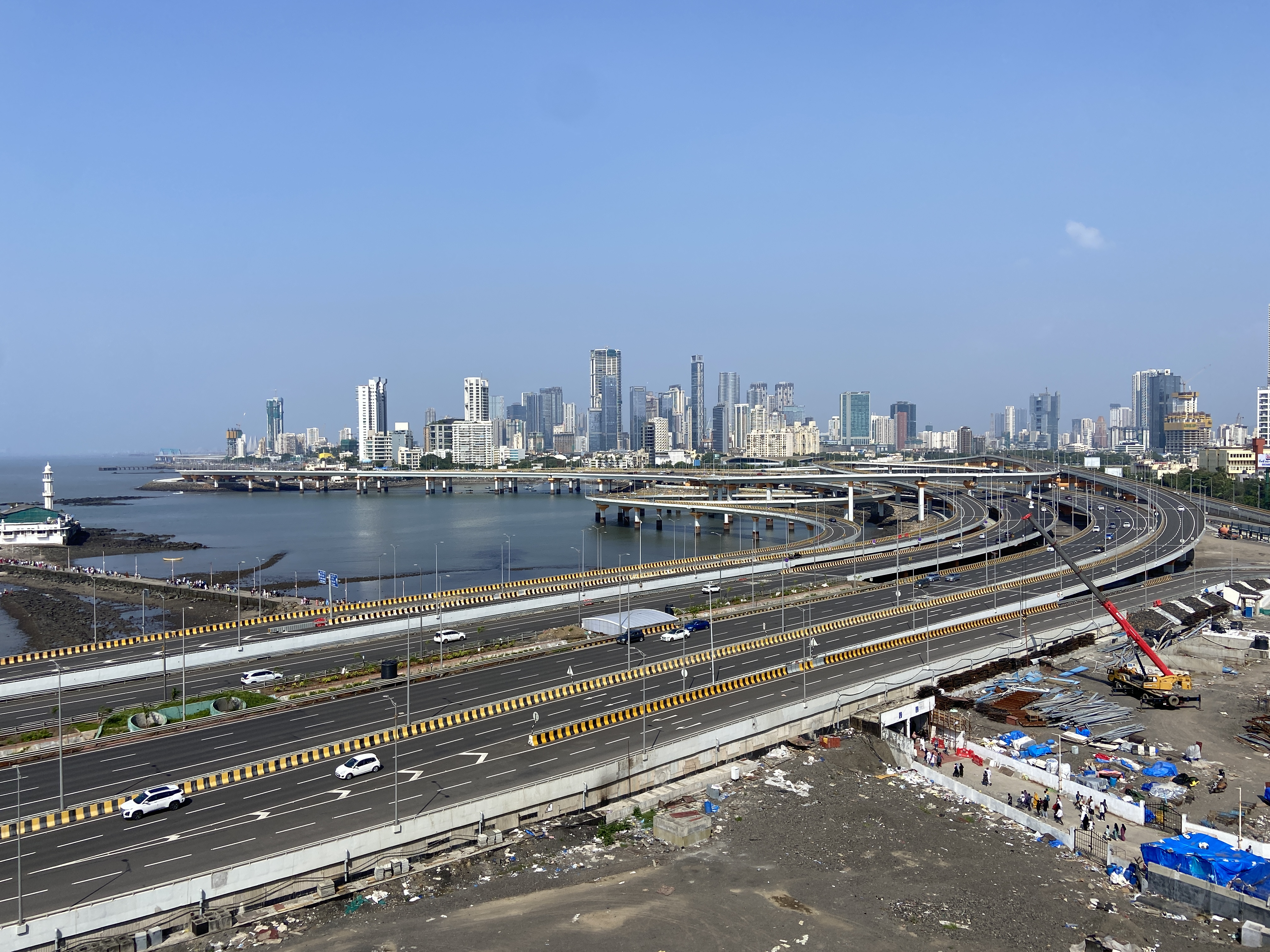
- Coastal Road, Mumbai, November 2025

Route information
- Maintained by Brihanmumbai Municipal Corporation
- Length: 14.0 km (8.7 mi)
- Status: 14.0 km out of 29.2 km Opened
- Existed: 11 March 2024 (Phase 1 - Marine Lines to Worli); Under Construction (Phase 2 - Bandra to Dahisar)–present
- Known for: Sambhaji Maharaj

Major junctions
- Beltway around Mumbai
- South end: Marine Lines
- North end: Dahisar

Location
- Country: India
- State: Maharashtra

Highway system
- Roads in India; Expressways; National; State; Asian; State Highways in Maharashtra

Coastal Road (officially known as Dharamveer Swarajya Rakshak Chhatrapati Sambhaji Maharaj Mumbai Coastal Road) is an 8-lane, 29.2-km long grade separated expressway along Mumbai's western coastline, connecting Marine Lines in the south to Kandivali in the north. It is projected to be used by 130,000 vehicles daily, and is expected to reduce travel time between South Mumbai and the Western Suburbs from 2 hours to only 40 minutes. The estimated cost of the project is ₹13,060 crore (US$1.4 billion). Its first phase, which was inaugurated on 11 March 2024, is a 10.58 km section from Princess Street flyover to the Worli end of the Bandra–Worli Sea Link.

== Planning ==
Wilbur Smith and Associates, commissioned in 1962 to study transportation in Mumbai, recommended construction of a 3.6 km road between Haji Ali and Nariman Point on reclaimed land and a 1.04 km tunnel under Malabar Hill up to Girgaon Chowpatty. Smith's report also proposed connectors to Walkeshwar Road and Chowpatty. However, the proposed road was not built. In 2011, Maharashtra Chief Minister Prithviraj Chavan proposed the Coastal Road as an alternative to the plan for the Western Freeway. Chavan asked the MSRDC to think of building coastal roads instead of capital intensive sea links. He appointed a Joint Technical Committee, comprising experts and officials, in 2012 under the then municipal commissioner Subodh Kumar to study the plan to build a coastal road. In its report, submitted in January 2012, the committee advised the government to build a 35.6 km coastal freeway from Manora MLA Hostel at Nariman Point to Kandivali to ease traffic congestion. The project was estimated to cost ₹10,000 crore (equivalent to ₹190 billion or US$2.0 billion in 2023) and would have consisted of roads built on reclaimed land as well as stilts, bridges and tunnels. The committee was against building any more sea links and pointed out that the coastal road would help save ₹12,000 crore (equivalent to ₹230 billion or US$2.3 billion in 2023) of public money.

The 35.6 km road was proposed to begin near Manora (MLA Hostel), with entry and exit points at Jagannath Bhosale Marg, move along Marine Drive and lead into a tunnel that would go under Malabar Hill and exit on the other side of Priyadarshini Park. This stretch was proposed to be built on reclaimed portions up to Haji Ali, and then to Lala Lajpatrai Road in Worli. The coastal freeway would then be connected to the Worli arm of the Bandra–Worli Sea Link by a bridge. On the Bandra side, the coastal road skirting the fort would connect the coastal freeway up to Chimbai village, where a bridge was proposed. A road by reclamation of mangroves, further north, or a road on stilts, and an elevated road between Oshiwara and Malad was also proposed. The proposed freeway would have had 18 entry and exit points along its route. Critics of the freeway opposed it due to the reclamation required and have also cited possible environmental degradation along the coast.

Coastal Regulation Zone (CRZ) norms in India disallow reclamation of land. Construction of the coastal freeway would require a relaxation of the CRZ norms, as certain sections are proposed on reclaimed land. The change in norms can only be done through an amendment to the law by the Central Government. After discussing the project on 10 April 2013, the Maharashtra Coastal Zone Management Authority (MCZMA), the state's apex environment body, urged the centre to amend the CRZ notification to permit "reclamation for roads". The MCZMA stated that reclamation should not be permitted for any other development activity and that the high tide line must not be altered. The MCZMA also argued that the ring road would serve as a protection wall from inland flooding, besides being a vital road link for decongesting traffic. During a meeting between Prithviraj Chavan and Union Environment Minister Jayanthi Natarajan on 20 June 2013, Natarajan expressed concerns about the implications of relaxing CRZ norms on creeks and mangroves. However, the minister stated that she would "put the state's proposal at the next meeting [24 June 2013] of the National Coastal Zone Management Authority". However, despite specific assurance from the minister, the National Coastal Zone Management Authority (NCZMA) decided not to include the coastal road plan in their next meeting's agenda.

During the 2014 assembly elections, the Bharatiya Janata Party (BJP) promised to implement the project if elected. After coming to power, the party modified and fast-tracked the project. On 6 June 2015, the State Government signed an MoU with the Dutch Government for technical co-operation in implementing the project. The Netherlands is known for its environment-friendly reclamation and the use of the sea. On 8 June 2015, the coastal road project received clearance from the Union Ministry of Environment and Forests. The Brihanmumbai Municipal Corporation (BMC) appointed STUP Consultants Pvt Ltd and Ernst & Young in 2016 to conduct an environmental impact assessment report and a feasibility report on the Coastal Road. The Comprehensive Traffic Studies conducted for Mumbai recommended the construction of a new arterial road along Mumbai's western coast.

Shiv Sena president Uddhav Thackeray stated on 26 November 2016 that a survey of the soil at the seabed was being undertaken. The project received final clearance from the Ministry of Environment, Forest and Climate Change on 11 May 2017. The foundation stone for the project was laid at Amarsons Garden in Cumbala Hill on 16 December 2018. The Environment Ministry asked the BMC to deposit 2% of the total project cost with the Mangrove Cell, a state government organization tasked with conserving mangroves. The BMC stated that it would pay the amount in instalments with the first payment of ₹25 crore (US$2.6 million), and subsequent payments being made as the project work progresses.

In May 2023, the BMC announced that it had finalized a new design for the Worli interchange after fishermen protested the previously proposed design. The original design proposed an arterial bridge constructed on pillars with a 60 metre span. Fishermen demanded a larger span of 200 metres as they felt the smaller gap would not be sufficient for boats particularly during strong waves. Chief Minister Eknath Shinde had directed BMC authorities in January 2023 to construct the pillars at a span of 120 metres instead. However, the BMC chose to construct a 120-metre-long bow-string bridge instead. The bow-string bridge is supported by high-tension chords and does not require as many pillars as the previous design. The change in design may push the project's deadline from November 2023 to May 2024. Officials stated that the bow bridge design was "suitable for smaller bridges built without any strong foundation".

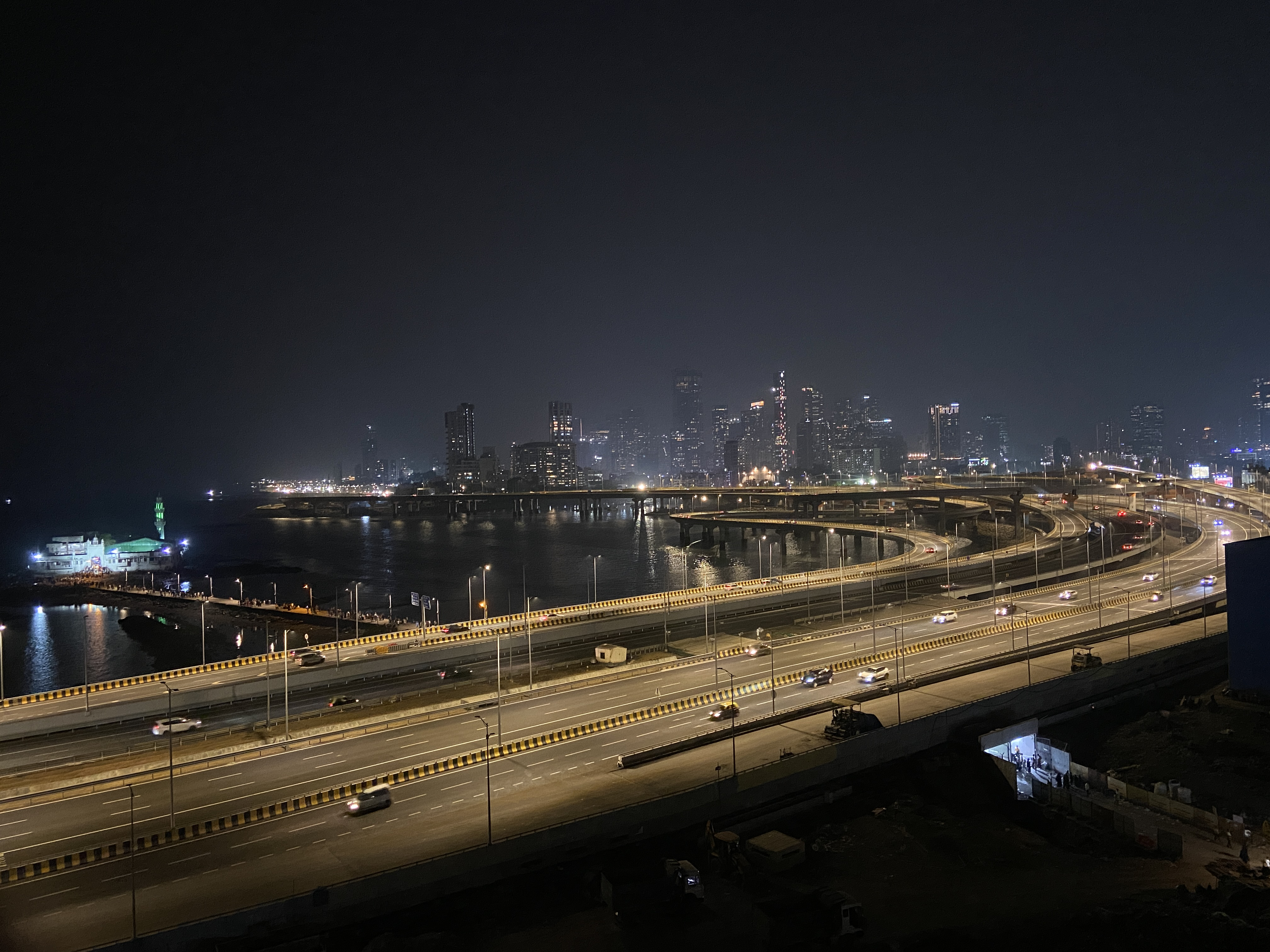
Coastal Road (Mumbai), by night (November 2024)

On 14 May 2023, Chief Minister Shinde announced that the Coastal Road would be named after Chattrapati Sambhaji Maharaj, the eldest son of Chattrapati Shivaji Maharaj. The announcement was made at an event held at the Gateway of India to commemorate Sambhaji's 366th birth anniversary. Shinde also stated that the government would build a statue of Sambhaji on the road.

According to BMC Additional Municipal Commissioner Ashwini Bhide, who led the first phase of the Coastal Road project, "The ultimate objective of the MCRP [Mumbai Coastal Road Project] is to decongest the existing roads. Mumbai is linear in shape for which traveling is mostly in north-south direction. Roads offer direct connectivity and the city will be able to maintain its proper pace only when there are improved roads, or else areas that don't have proper connectivity despite potential and high land value will not be able to flourish." Bhide also noted that Mumbai had a total road network of only 2,050 km compared to 28,000 km in Delhi (as of June 2023) and the city's expansion was limited by its geography. She stated that the government was also expanding the metro rail network but improving the road network was also required to provide last mile connectivity, for freight transport in the city, and to reduce the load on existing public transit systems. The first phase of the Coastal Road is expected to reduce travel time between Princess Street and the Bandra–Worli Sea Link from 35–45 minutes during peak hours to under 10 minutes. It is also projected to reduce fuel consumption by 35% and carbon emissions by 1,826 tons annually.

== Design ==
=== Land reclamation ===
The project involved the reclamation of 111 hectares (1.11 km^{2}) of land from the sea, of which 26.5 hectares (0.265 km^{2}) was used for the road and its interchanges, and 14.5 hectares (0.145 km^{2}) to build a seawall. The remaining 70 hectares (0.70 km^{2}) or about 63.6% of the total reclaimed land will be used as a green space and for recreational amenities. This is the largest land reclamation undertaken in the history of independent India. A 4.35 km stretch of the Coastal Road is built on reclaimed land.

=== Promenade ===
The 70 hectares (0.70 km^{2}) of reclaimed land left over after constructing the Coastal Road is planned to be used for green and recreational areas. A 7.47 km long and 20 metre wide contiguous promenade runs parallel to the Coastal Road, on its seaward side, from Priyadarshini Park to the Worli end of the Bandra–Worli Sea Link. It is twice the length of Marine Drive, which is currently the city's longest promenade. A total of 16 pedestrian underpasses (1 every 500 metres) between Priyadarshini Park and Worli provide access to the promenade. The BMC proposes to build gardens and parks, a cycling and jogging track, public toilets, an open auditorium, a butterfly park and other recreation spaces. In August 2025, the BMC opened the first 5.5 km stretch of the promenade to the public as part of a phased rollout of the full 7.5 km seafront walkway.

=== Seawall ===
An 8.5 metre high seawall was constructed along a 7.47 km stretch of the road to protect the reclamation and prevent flooding during high tide. The BMC also placed boulders, weighing between 2-8 tonnes, obtained from the Navi Mumbai International Airport construction site along the seaface. The agency stated that the boulders could resist high velocity waves better than the tetrapods used at Marine Drive. The boulders may dislocate due to continuous exposure to waves and heavy monsoon rain. The BMC stated that it would continuously monitor the boulders and repair them in case of dislocation.

=== Floodgates ===
The BMC's stormwater drains department installed 16 floodgates at 4 locations along the Coastal Road. The channels extend 100 metres into the sea and have a diameter between 2,000 and 2,500 mm.

=== Bus bays/Parking ===
The BMC constructed 10 bus bays along the Coastal Road for public transport buses. The project also includes underground parking facilities at 4 locations including Amarsons Garden, Worli and Haji Ali that can accommodate 1,856 vehicles in total.

=== Tunnels ===
The Coastal Road includes 2.07 km twin tunnels connecting Girgaon Chowpatty and Priyadarshini Park. The north-bound tunnel is 2,072 metres long while the south-bound tunnel is 10 metres longer due to a slight curvature along the route. A tunnel was selected for this stretch over a sea link to avoid disrupting the view at the Queen's Necklace and Girgaon Chowpatty and to preserve the "heritage, the look and feel of this place". There were also concerns that a sea link would create a security risk in Malabar Hill, where the Raj Bhavan is located. The tunnels have an outer diameter of 12.19 metres and inner diameter of 11 metres. Each tunnel carries a 3.2 metre wide, three-lane road with 6 crosswalks, of which 4 are for pedestrians and two for motorists. The tunnels are located at depths of 14–72 meters below the surface. It passes 14–15 metres under Girgaon Chowpatty, 20 metres below Priyadarshini Park and 72 metres under Malabar Hill and the Hanging Gardens. A 1 km stretch of the tunnels also pass 17–20 metres under the Arabian Sea making them the first undersea tunnels in India.

The tunnels utilize the Saccardo ventilation system, which is the first time the system was installed in India. Three fans with a diameter of 2 metres each are installed in each tunnel. The fans operate in sequence, with two rotating at any given time. Fans located in a fan chamber outside the tunnel are used to pump outside air into the tunnels through Saccardo nozzles, also called injectors, installed in both tunnels. The ventilation system can pump out smoke in case of a fire and reduce accumulation. BMC Chief Engineer Manthaiya Swami stated that the system can manage smoke for up to three hours. The tunnels are lined with fire protection sheets, also called fire boards, which enable the concrete surface to withstand temperatures of slightly over 200 degrees Celsius. The twin tunnels also have cross passages to enable people to move between the tunnels in case of an emergency.

== Construction ==
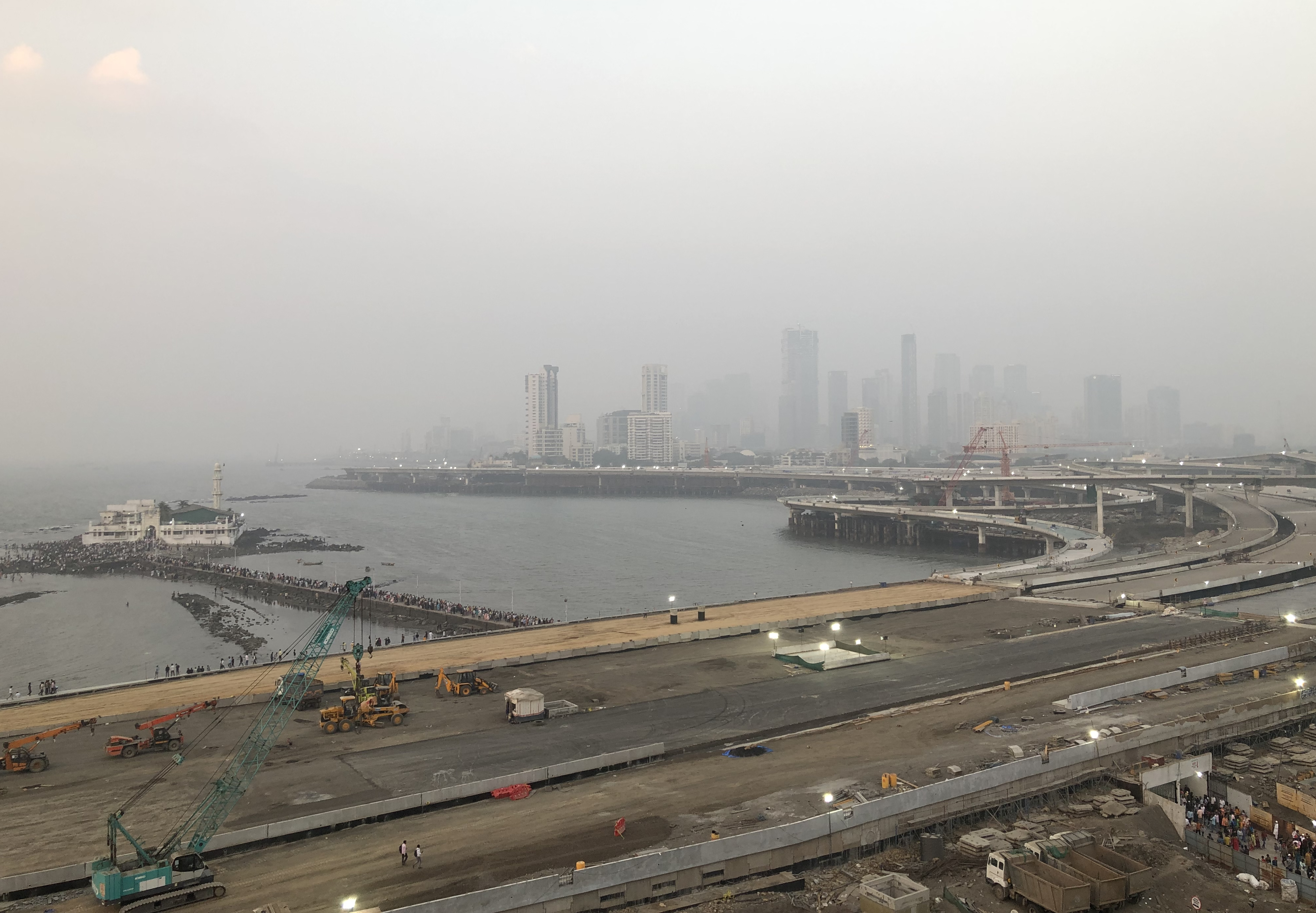
Coastal road under construction, Mumbai (January 2024)

The Coastal Road will be built in two phases. It will have 8 lanes, including 2 lanes dedicated for a bus rapid transit system. AECOM is the project's general consultant.

=== Phase I ===
The first phase of the project is a 10.58 km section from Princess Street Flyover at Marine Lines to the Worli-end of the Bandra–Worli Sea Link (BWSL). The phase includes sections of the road built on reclaimed land, bridges, twin tunnels and 3 interchanges. The interchange arms have a total length of 15.66 km. It also involves building floodgates, a seawall/promenade, creation of green and recreational spaces, and underground parking facilities. The project was estimated to cost ₹12,721 crore (US$1.3 billion), including ₹8,429 crore (US$880 million) for the construction work. The remaining amount was for administrative costs and contingencies. It is the most expensive project undertaken in the BMC's history. The project cost escalated to ₹13,060 crore (US$1.4 billion) due to an increase in the GST rate on construction from 12% to 18%, and the need to shift a water pipeline that had not been accounted for in the original design. The BMC levied a total fine of ₹31 crore (US$3.2 million) on the contractors for missing the project's deadline.

The BMC awarded contracts for the project in four packages in October 2018. Larsen and Toubro was awarded Package 1 and 4 at a cost of ₹7,489 crore (US$780 million), and a joint venture between Hindustan Construction Company (55%) and Hyundai Development Company (45%) was awarded Package 2 and 3 at a cost of ₹2,126 crore (US$220 million). Package 1 includes the construction of a 3.82 km long section over reclaimed land from Priyadarshini Park to Baroda Palace and interchanges at Amarson Garden and Haji Ali. Package 4 includes the construction of a 3.93 km section from Princess Street flyover to Priyadarshini Park, including the up and down ramps from Marine Drive connecting to the twin tunnels passing below Girgaum Chowpatty, Malabar Hills, and exit at Priyadarshini Park to connect with section in Package 1. Packages 2 and 3 involves a bridge spanning 0.9 km, an interchange, a 3.2-km-long ramp and a 1.9-km embankment between Baroda Palace near Haji Ali and the Worli end of Bandra–Worli Sea Link.

Construction on the project began on 13 October 2018, and was expected to be completed in 2022. Nine petitioners moved the Bombay High Court seeking to halt construction alleging that land reclamation was illegal and would irreversibly alter the coastal environment. On 16 April 2019, the High Court ordered all construction activities on the project to be halted until 3 June 2019. On 26 April 2019, the BMC appealed the order in the Supreme Court. The agency stated that it had received all required permissions to carry out construction and that delay due to the stay order was causing a loss of ₹10 crore (US$1.0 million) per day. On 6 May, the Supreme Court permitted contractors to continue work in areas where construction had already begun but prohibited beginning work in any new areas pending the Bombay High Court's decision in June 2019. Contractors resumed piling work at Amarsons Garden within hours of the Supreme Court decision. BMC officials stated on 14 May that round-the-clock construction had resumed at all project sites covered by the Supreme Court's order. The agency had already begun construction activities for about 17% of the total work on Phase I. The work includes construction of a sea wall, site offices for engineers, and pits for construction of the two tunnels. The BMC stated that it had expected to complete this work before the start of the monsoon season and had planned to pause construction during the monsoon to reduce impact on marine life. Due to the delays caused by the Court case, the agency stated that it would continue construction throughout the monsoon season whenever it was possible to do so without impacting marine life.

The BMC filed affidavits in response to the petitions challenging the project in the High Court on 3 June. The Court commenced hearings on the petitions from 17 June. The BMC stated that it had received all necessary environmental approvals related to the project. The Court reserved judgment on the public interest litigations on 1 July, and will commence final hearings on 17 July 2019. On 16 July, the Bombay High Court cancelled the approval granted by MCZMA and by the MoEF to the Coastal Road project citing a lack of "proper scientific study". The Court ruled that the MCGM could not proceed with construction until they obtained an environmental clearance after a proper Environmental Impact Assessment was conducted, and the MCZMA would require permission under the Wildlife Protection Act, 1972. On 27 July, the Supreme Court refused to stay the High Court's order halting construction on the project. However, the Supreme Court agreed to hear the MCGM's plea seeking interim relief on 20 August.

The BMC administration informed corporators on 21 August that work had been completely halted since 16 July. The agency stated that it had completed 6.25% of the total work on the project and had spent ₹593 crore (US$62 million). The BMC also stated that it had planned to complete 12.56% of the work at this stage but was unable to do so due to the legal hurdles. Contractors began decommissioning machinery and equipment from work sites in September 2019. BMC chief Praveen Pardeshi stated that work would only resume after the Supreme Court verdict. Hindustan Times quoted an unnamed BMC official as stating that the machinery was being removed from the Tata Garden area to facilitate the filming of the Hollywood film Tenet. On 17 December 2019, the Supreme Court placed a stay on the High Court order and permitted the Coastal Road project to continue. However, the Court prohibited authorities from carrying out any construction work other than that required for the road itself, which would affect the BMC's plans to develop parks and gardens adjacent to the road. On 30 September 2022, the Supreme Court amended its previous order and permitted works not related to the road itself. The BMC assured the Court that it would not permit any residential or commercial development on the reclaimed land and would also seek permission from the Court before carrying out any further reclamation in the city.

BMC officials stated that 17% of total work had been completed as on 20 December 2020. In July 2021, the BMC stated that 90% of land reclamation had been completed. In August 2021, the BMC announced that it would adopt monopile technology to construct the pillars of bridges on the Coastal Road. This marked the first deployment of the technology in India. BMC officials stated that the technology enabled the construction of pillars with only one pile supporting it, instead of the four that would have been required. The agency noted that it would reduce the total piles required for the project from 704 to 176. The BMC stated that it had completed 40% of work in September 2021, 58% in July 2022, and 67% of work had been completed by December 2022. The agency stated that 75% of work on the project, and 95% of land reclamation had been completed on 30 May 2023.

==== Tunneling ====
The 2.07 km twin tunnels connecting Priyadarshini Park and Girgaon Chowpatty were dug using a Single Shield earth pressure balance (EPB) tunnel boring machine (TBM) named Mavala. The ramps at the entry/exit portals were built using the cut-and-cover method. Tunneling required digging through breccia, basalt, shale and under the Arabian Sea. The TBM was built by China Railway Construction Heavy Industry Company Limited (CRCHIL) and had a diameter of 12.19 metres, was 82 metres long and weighed over 2,800 tonnes making it the largest TBM ever used to dig a tunnel in India. The TBM was shipped on 70 containers with 184 consignments from Shanghai and arrived at Jawaharlal Nehru Port in Mumbai in April 2020. It was then dismantled, loaded onto 17 trucks and transported to Priyadarshini Park. CRCHIL staff were scheduled to visit Mumbai to assemble the TBM, however, they were unable to do so due to COVID-19 pandemic related travel restrictions. Engineers from L&T and the BMC re-assembled the TBM themselves over a period of 6 months.

Tunneling work began on 11 January 2021 from Priyadarshini Park, and the first breakthrough at the Girgaon Chowpatty end occurred on 10 January 2022. The TBM began digging the second tunnel from the Girgaon Chowpatty end on 26 April 2022. On 3 August 2022, L&T announced that Mavala had set a world record for longest distance excavated in a month by a Single Shield EPB TBM. Mavala had dug a 456.72 metre stretch, beating the previous world record of 455.4 metres. Tunneling work came to a halt in December 2022 after the TBM broke down due to a rubber bearing malfunctioning. Officials had to order a spare part from Italy. Work resumed in March 2023, and the second tunnel breakthrough was completed on 30 May 2023. The BMC stated that 700,000 metric tonnes or 38,700 truckloads of muck was excavated to dig the twin tunnels. Some of the muck was used for the project's land reclamation work, while the rest was deemed unsuitable and disposed. A team of 160 people, including 30 engineers, worked on construction of the twin tunnels.

==== Coral reefs ====
Corals are an endangered species protected under Schedule I of the Wild Life (Protection) Act, 1972. The Mangrove and Marine Biodiversity Conservation Foundation of Maharashtra conducted a 4 month study during monsoon season in 2019 to identify coral species living along Mumbai's western coastline that could be affected by the land reclamation for the Coastal Road project. The marine biologists found 11 species of corals at 8 locations in Juhu, Carter Road, Bandra Bandstand, Worli Sea Face, Nepean Sea Road, Marine Drive and Geeta Nagar in Colaba. Nine hard coral species were identified of which 5 species were of the Rhizangiidae family, 2 were from the Siderastreidae family, while the remaining were from the Caryophylliidae, Dendrophylliidae, Siderastreidae, and Poritidae (Goniopora) families. Both soft coral species belonged to the Gorgoniidae family.

The Union Environment Ministry and the Maharashtra Forest Department granted permission to relocate two coral species from Worli to a site 200 metres away from the Coastal Road and from Haji Ali to a protected zone in Navy Nagar. The National Institute of Oceanography (NIO) began the relocation process on 12 November 2020, and a total of 329 colonies of corals were shifted. An NIO study conducted a year later found that 303 colonies (or 92.1%) had survived the relocation and were healthy.

=== Phase 2 ===
Work on the second phase, a 19.22 km road between the Bandra end of the BWSL and Kandivali, will be constructed by MSRDC. The phase includes the 9.5 km Versova–Bandra Sea Link. A Sea link connecting Bandra to Virar has been approved by MMRDA. The coastal road is to be extended till Vasai-Virar. The Versova–Virar sea link will be constructed by MMRDA, the 43 KM elevated road would be built at an estimated 63000 crores.

== Alignment ==
The Coastal Road will begin from BD Somani Chowk, 280 metres south of the Princess Street Flyover. A two-lane road will be constructed from the traffic signal near the Wankhede Stadium for north-bound traffic. One kilometre of the existing 3.6 km C-shaped Marine Drive promenade will be utilized to construct the road, and a new 1 km long and 8–10 meters wide promenade will be built to compensate for the loss of pedestrian space due to project. The new promenade will run parallel to Coastal Road, on its seaward side, go over the tunnel near Charni Road station and continue north along the alignment providing a contiguous pedestrian walkway from the National Centre for the Performing Arts to Girgaon Chowpatty. The promenade will be constructed on a cantilever bridge ensuring that sea waves can flow without colliding with the structure. It will also prevent the tides from washing over the promenade as is common on the existing Marine Drive during the monsoon season.

The two-lane road for north-bound traffic from Wankhede Stadium will enter into a tunnel near Charni Road station. On the opposite side of the road, two lanes for south-bound traffic emerge from the tunnel and merge onto the existing service road outside Wilson Gymkhana. The project will occupy a portion of the Gymkhana grounds and reduce the existing service road to a 6.6 metre wide single-lane service road with a footpath. The twin tunnels pass under Girgaon Chowpatty, the Arabian Sea, the Hanging Gardens, and Malabar Hill. The north-bound tunnel is 2,072 metres long while the south-bound tunnel is 10 metres longer due to a slight curvature along the route. After Malabar Hill, the Coastal Road continues north and emerges above ground. The highway passes over a bridge near Samudra Mahal building, continues on reclaimed land before passing over another bridge over the Worli Nullah. The Coastal Road continues north on reclaimed land and a small sea link connects it with the Worli-end of the Bandra–Worli Sea Link.

This Coastal Road has interchanges at Haji Ali, Breach Candy, Amarsons Garden, Worli, and Bandra.

The Haji Ali interchange is a multi-level structure with four feeder roads to facilitate access to the Coastal Road from any direction of approach to the Haji Ali signal. Two arms of interchange cross over each other at a height of 24 metres above sea level. The Breach Candy interchange has four ramps all connecting to Bhulabhai Desai Road (also called Warden Road).

=== Vehicle Restrictions ===
Upon opening of all phases of the Coastal Road, due to safety considerations, only passenger cars, and BEST/State Transport buses are allowed to ride on the Coastal Road. Heavy vehicles such as trucks and trailers, two and three-wheelers, pedestrians, and animal drawn carriages will not be permitted to use the Coastal Road and are subjected to penalties from traffic police. The prohibition on two wheelers extends to pedal bicycles as well, but due to the non-provision of penalties against bicyclists under the Motor Vehicles Act, traffic cops will not be able to use MVA penalties against bicyclists for violation.

== Controversy ==
The Guardian newspaper published on 21 January 2026 an article by Amrit Dhillon, a writer based in New Delhi, headlined 'Exclusively for the elite': Mumbai's motorway is a symbol of wealth divide. The article stated that, "With 64% of the city's residents relying on buses and trains so overcrowded that up to 10 passengers die a day, anger is rising over a taxpayer-funded road that most will never use."

In February 2026, the BMC was criticized for adding a musical lane on the Coastal Road by using rumble strips. Critics pointed out that the priorities of BMC should have been fixing critical infrastructure, as the city still grappled from potholes across other locations, along with other poor basic necessities, rather than spend resources on such costly beautification projects. The musical lane was also criticized for creating noise disturbance for residents living nearby.

== Accidents and incidents ==
Since the Coastal Road was opened to traffic, several traffic incidents and crashes have been reported. Although monitored by cameras, instances of speed limit violations and reckless driving continue to be reported. The speed limit is 80 km/h on straight sections, 60 km/h inside the tunnels, and 40 km/h at turns, entry and exit points, and merging sections. Incidents of water seepage into the tunnels have also been reported, with the Brihanmumbai Municipal Corporation carrying out repairs.

On 3 September 2026, a video circulated showing several supercars being driven at high speed in the emergency lane of the Coastal Road. The Mumbai Police registered a case under sections 281 and 185 of the Bharatiya Nyaya Sanhita and section 184 of the Motor Vehicles Act, in connection with the incident.

== Timeline ==
- July 2021: 90% of the land required for the project was acquired by Brihanmumbai Municipal Corporation (BMC). This extended the road one hundred metres inside the Arabian Sea. The boring machine completed the digging of 500 metres of coastal road.
- September 2021: BMC completes 1-km tunnel boring for project.
- September 2021: 40% work completed for coastal road project, and is expected to be fully operational by November 2023, as of 23 September.
- December 2021: BMC completes 2-km tunnel boring for the project.
- January 2022: BMC fully completes the tunnel boring for the project.
- July 2022: The project is now 58% completed, and is expected to be completed by November 2023.
- May 2023: The coastal road is officially named as Dharmveer Swarajya Rakshak Chhatrapati Sambhaji Maharaj Coastal Road.

== See also ==
- Bandra–Worli Sea Link
- Embarcadero Freeway
