= Western Expressway =

Western Expressway may refer to:

- Florida State Road 429, also known as the Western Expressway, Orlando, United States
- Massachusetts Turnpike, originally proposed as the Western Expressway, Boston, United States

== See also ==
- Western Freeway (disambiguation)
