= Motor Vehicles Act =

Motor vehicle act in India

Motor Vehicles Act, 1988

Parliament of India
- Long title: An Act to consolidate and amend the law relating to motor vehicles.
- Citation: Act No. 59 of 1988
- Territorial extent: Whole of India
- Enacted by: Parliament of India
- Enacted: 1988
- Signed by: R. Venkataraman
- Commenced: 1 July 1989

Repeals
- Motor Vehicles Act, 1939

Amended by
- Motor Vehicles (Amendment) Act, 1994; Motor Vehicles (Amendment) Act, 2000; Motor Vehicles (Amendment) Act, 2001; Motor Vehicles (Amendment) Act, 2015; Motor Vehicles (Amendment) Act, 2019; Jan Vishwas (Amendment of Provisions) Act, 2023

Related legislation
- Motor Vehicles Act, 1914
- Status: In force

The Motor Vehicles Act is an Act of the Parliament of India which regulates all aspects of road transport vehicles. The Act provides in detail the legislative provisions regarding licensing of drivers/conductors, registration of motor vehicles, control of motor vehicles through permits, special provisions relating to state transport undertakings, traffic regulation, insurance, liability, offences and penalties. For exercising the legislative provisions of the Act, the Government of India made the Central Motor Vehicles Rules 1989.

== Purpose ==
The main reasons behind drafting and enacting this legislation include the rapidly increasing number of vehicles in the country and the need for encouraging adoption of higher technology in the automotive sector. There also existed a need for effectively tracking down traffic offenders and providing more deterrent punishment for certain offences. There was also a growing concern for the framing of standards around vehicle components and road safety, as well as measures for pollution control. Additionally, there was a necessity for improved regulation around the registration of drivers, with there being a need for stricter protocol around granting driving licences. The system of vehicular registration also merited change, with an updated system being brought in place for registration marks, as well as for the maintenance of State registers for driving licenses and vehicle registration. The Act was also brought in to liberalise the grant of permits for vehicles carrying goods, as well as to rationalise definitions for types of vehicles.

== History and amendments ==
=== Previous Acts ===
==== Indian Motor Vehicles Act, 1914 ====
The "Indian Motor Vehicles Act, 1914" was a central legislation passed and applicable in British India. Some princely states followed suit, with local modifications. Motor vehicles were first introduced in India towards the end of the 19th century, and the 1914 Act was the first legislation to regulate their use. It had 18 sections, and gave local governments the responsibility of registering and licensing vehicles and motorists, and enforcing regulations.

The "Indian Motor Vehicles Act, 1914" was amended by the "Indian Motor Vehicles (Amendment) Act, 1920" (Act No. XXVII of 1920) passed by the Imperial Legislative Council. It received assent from the Governor General of India on 2 September 1920. The Act amended sections 11 and 18 of the 1914 Act.

==== Indian Motor Vehicles (Amendment) Act, 1924 ====
The Act was amended again by the "Indian Motor Vehicles (Amendment) Act, 1924" (Act No. XV of 1924). The Act received assent from the Governor General on 18 September 1924. It had the title, "An Act further to amend the Indian Motor Vehicles Act, 1914, for certain purposes" and amended section 11 of the 1914 Act by inserting the words "and the duration for which" after the words "area in which" in clause (a) of subsection (2) of section 11.

It was replaced by the Motor Vehicles Act, 1939, which came into force in 1940. The motor vehicles act has again been replaced in 1988. The 1988 amendment was brought to address above mentioned statements of object and reasons.

=== Motor Vehicles Act,1988 ===
The Motor Vehicles Act, 1988 came into force from 1 July 1989. It replaced Motor Vehicles Act, 1939 which earlier replaced the first such enactment Motor Vehicles Act, 1914. The Act provides in detail the legislative provisions regarding licensing of drivers/conductors, registration of motor vehicles, control of motor vehicles through permits, special provisions relating to state transport undertakings, traffic regulation, insurance, liability, offences and penalties, etc. For exercising the legislative provisions of the Act, the Government of India made the Central Motor Vehicles Rules 1989.

==== Definitions ====
- Motor vehicle: Any mechanically propelled vehicle adapted for use upon roads whether the power of propulsion is transmitted from an external or internal source of power. The Motor Vehicles Act, 1988, like the earlier Act of 1939, makes the insurance of motor vehicles compulsory. The owner of every motor vehicle is bound to insure his vehicle against third party risk. The insurance company, i.e., the insurer, covers risk of loss to the third party by the use of the motor vehicle.

==== Accident claims ====
There is a provision to provide ₹500,000 (US$5,200) with no upper limit, as interim relief to the family of a victim of fatal accidents. The cases of road accident compensation claims are decided in the Motor Accident Claims Tribunal.

=== The Road Transport And Safety Bill ===
The Road Transport and Safety Bill, 2014 envisioned providing a framework for safer, faster, cost-effective and inclusive movement of passengers and freight in India, thus enabling the mission of 'Make In India' following the death of the union minister Gopinath Munde in 2014.

The bill proposed to set up the Motor Vehicle Regulation & Road Safety Authority of India, an independent agency for vehicle regulation and road safety which would be legally empowered and accountable to Parliament.

Later due to controversies listed down in the controversies section, The bill was subsequently replaced by the Motor Vehicles (Amendment) Bill, 2017.

=== Indian Motor Vehicles (Amendment) bill, 2017 ===
A significant upgrade to the motor vehicle laws, it envisaged body cams on traffic cops and RTO officials to check corruption, 7-year imprisonment instead of current 2 years for drink-driving deaths, mandatory 3rd party insurance for all vehicles, and stiffer penalties for traffic violations to reduce the accident rates. The bill was passed by the Lok Sabha in April 2017 and sent to the Rajya Sabha, which referred it to a select committee in August 2017. The bill was again scrutinized by a joint standing committee composed of Transport ministers of 18 states of India.

Due to frequent disruptions in Rajya Sabha and lack of support from Indian National Congress, the bill failed to turn into act and lapsed after the conclusion of interim budget session and on the account of general elections.

=== Indian Motor Vehicles (Amendment) Act, 2019 ===
This is similar to the Indian Motor Vehicles (Amendment) bill, 2017, although, introduced later in 2019 so the name. The earlier bill has lapsed at the end of the last session of 16th Lok Sabha. The bill was re-introduced in the first session of 17th Lok Sabha by union transport minister Nitin Gadkari which is then passed by both the houses before the end of the session. It came in to force on 1 September 2019, providing higher penalties for traffic offences.

==== Implementation of the Amended Law ====
As per the official notification issued by the central government on 28 August 2019, the 63 clauses of the Motor Vehicles (Amendment) Act, 2019 to be implemented from 1 September 2019 as these clauses do not need any further modifications in the Central Motor Vehicles rules, 1989. These include higher penalties for various traffic offences, national transportation policy among others.

== Controversies ==
Tamil Nadu Government opposed the Road Transport and Safety Bill and asked centre to redraft it as bill encroaches upon the financial, legislative and administrative powers of state governments. A nationwide strike was called by various transport unions on 30 April 2015 to protest against the bill.

West Bengal's transport ministry informed the state assembly on 27 August 2019 that the amended Motor Vehicles act will not be implemented in West Bengal since the state government is against the hefty fines proposed in the act.

=== Limited provisions for non-motorized and self-propelled vehicles ===
The Motor Vehicles Act, 2019 implemented harsher penalties on motor vehicles for traffic violations. This led to an increase in sale and use of non-motorized and self-propelled forms of transport, such as bicycles for short commutes. As per the Motor Vehicles Act, bicycles do not require licenses, registration, insurance, and road tax to ride, which also applies to electric bicycles with power up to 250 watts or lesser and maximum speed upto 25 km/h(15.5 mph).

The Motor Vehicles Act, however, neither mentions specific rules and regulations, nor states penalties for bicyclists on certain violations, although certain guidelines and recommendations exist for bicyclists to follow traffic signs, along with mandate for motor vehicles to give the right of way to bicyclists and pedestrians. Due to no specific legislations, law enforcement in states and cities have made own rules against pedal-bicycles, some of which have earned negative reception by bicyclists, transport experts, and lawyers. Beginning in 2008, the Kolkata traffic police prohibited the entry of bicycles on major streets, justifying that they cause traffic congestion, due to which traffic cops citywide began imposing penalties of ₹ 100-300 and impounding bicycles for refusal to comply and pay the penalties using the Calcutta Suburban Police Act. The order was amended in 2013, 2014 and 2017 based on number of roads restricted, and temporarily suspended during the lockdown caused by COVID-19. Protests took place against such bans, as neither bicycles have caused traffic congestion by traffic experts, nor the ban was approved by the State Government; furthermore, small slips were issued with Kolkata Police emblem stamped for the penalties instead of an authorized Government receipt, which incensed corruption and bribery. As a result of the ban, Public Interest Litigations were filed in the Kolkata High Court in 2014 against the traffic police department, which subsequently reduced the ban of bicycles from 174 to 62 thoroughfares following the court's intervention. In August 2010, the Supreme Court overturned an order of Municipal Corporation of Delhi that curbed a number of cycle rickshaws that can ply in the New Delhi region, noting that the order was anti-poor and violated the rights of those owning and using non-motorized vehicles.

There have also been instances where traffic cops have penalized bicyclists for certain offenses under Motor Vehicles Act sections instead of State Police laws. Furthermore, across the country, without official policies, traffic officers have either seized bicycles or deflated tires for deterrence, which have attracted criticism and ire of riders - in 2015, the Chandigarh Police began to effect penalties against bicyclists following an increase in mishaps and fatalities caused by them. Several incidents of bicyclists penalized on other Motor Vehicles Act offenses have also been reported. For serious offenses like riding under influence, hit-and-run, street racing, or performing dangerous stunts, law enforcement have taken action under respective state police laws - while riding under influence has led to public intoxication charges if riders are found to have higher than permissible blood alcohol level(30mg/100ml as per Motor Vehicles Act) through breathalyzer test, no provision exists for hit-and-run, although cops do try to stop bicyclists who indulge in street racing and stunts. To curb the menace of performing stunts, the Kolkata traffic police in 2018 began penalizing bicyclists under section 184 for dangerous driving and sought to enhance it from ₹ 100 to 1000, but it was met with resistance due to no license requirement .The department also began to prosecute bicyclists for drunken riding if the riders failed the breathalyzer tests from November 2021 under section 510 of the Indian Penal Code (later section 24 of Bharatiya Nyaya Sanhita), and as of March 2025, is the only law enforcement department nationwide to penalize for pedaling under influence.

While some metropolitan cities have dedicated infrastructure like bicycle tracks, these dedicated lanes have found limited success as they are mostly in short distances, often built haphazardly, found in disrepair, or occupied by motorists who drive or park on them, as well as illegal occupation by hawkers. In addition, while unofficial restrictions exist on certain roads in metropolitan regions without proper signs, traffic cops use the opportunity to pull-over bicyclists and penalize them; failure to pay resulted in cops impounding and towing away bicycles, besides abuse of power against riders. To prevent mishaps and accidents, as well as for improving traffic flow and reducing slowdown, the Mumbai traffic police enacted a prohibition on two and three wheelers on the Bandra–Worli Sea Link, the Trans Harbour Link, Eastern Freeway, the BKC-Chunabhatti flyover, and the Coastal Road; the order applied to bicyclists as well, but without any mention of penalties and lack of signs; though riders need not require licenses, the penalties imposed against bicyclists follow the same standards for Motor Vehicles, which are extremely steep and criticized by cyclists organizations. For riding on the prohibited roads and bridges, the penalties were set at ₹ 1200 as of 2014. For safety precautions, an official ban on bicycles has been enacted on expressways nationwide, due to high-speed limits and access control, while riders are allowed to enter on National Highways and main roads of metro cities, as speed limits are kept at 40 km/h in suburban regions and 80-100 km/h on National Highways.

Due to rising incidents of bicycle fatalities, especially during night time with insufficient lighting on streets, the Supreme Court of India passed an order in December 2022 mandating certified reflectors on bicycles, following which riders and bicycle manufacturers will be subjected to severe penalties. However, several bicycle manufacturers expressed concerns, as the demand and supply for the reflectors was have been high and only few units could make such reflectors. While an order was passed for the reflectors in June 2016, the order was deferred by the Supreme Court several times to meet the rising demand. The new reflectors became mandatory in November 2023, and failure to comply would result in penalties for bicycle manufacturers.

=== Rights for pedestrians ===
The Motor Vehicles Act does not provide any rights for safety of pedestrians. As pedestrians have been a significant cause of road crashes, they are still considered as driver error, while pedestrians are rarely found accountable for such crashes. Despite the absence of jaywalking as an offense in the Motor Vehicles Act, some state police forces have made laws penalizing pedestrians who indulge in it. However, this action has earned negative reception, mostly due to lack of pedestrian crossings, like subways, overpasses, or at-grade crossings, considering that most pedestrian crossings are only located at traffic lights. Furthermore, due to hazardous occupation and encroachment on sidewalks or footpaths, this forces pedestrians to walk on the roads, for which the Supreme Court, in May 2025, directed states for making guidelines for pedestrian safety. The Court ruled in 2026 that the Constitution guaranteed a "right to walk" on footpaths, and that the MVA had undermined this right.

=== 2024 protests ===
In January 2024, protests were organized against new law dealing with the hit-and-run cases in Bharatiya Nyaya Sanhita, which replaced the Indian Penal Code (IPC) in July 2024. It has a provision under Section 106 (2), that attracts punishment of up to 10 years for drivers and a fine of ₹7 lakh who cause a serious road accident by negligent driving and run away without informing the police or any official from the administration. Large-scale traffic congestion on roads caused by the protests caused inconvenience for citizens in many states, including Punjab, Uttar Pradesh, Maharashtra, Madhya Pradesh and West Bengal. In many locations, there were lengthy lines at gas stations as residents hurried to fill up their cars in anticipation of a possible gasoline shortage brought on by the protest.

Approximately 2,000 gas stations, primarily in western and northern India, ran out of fuel during the truckers' associations' strike. In advance of the truckers' strike, state-owned oil companies topped off tanks at the majority of gas stations nationwide; nonetheless, excessive traffic caused several gas stations in Rajasthan, Madhya Pradesh, Maharashtra, and Punjab to run out of stock, according to industry authorities. On 2 January, Chandigarh imposed restrictions on the sale of petrol and diesel at fuel stations after a strike. According to Union estimates, there is a $12 million revenue loss daily due to the strike.

=== Unsafe vehicles ===
The Motor Vehicles Act does not have any regulations on the sales of any vehicles which have been rated as unsafe in crash tests, despite the legislation mandating some bare minimum safety features such as ABS and Airbags. While the implementation of crash testing under Bharat NCAP helps customers know safety ratings, the crash testing has not been made mandatory. This allows manufacturers to sell cars that have been rated unsafe to customers nationwide, which have been rated poorly in crash tests despite safety features.
