= Bandra–Worli Sea Link =

Bridge connecting Bandra Basitt and Worli, Mumbai, India

Bandra-Worli Sea Link
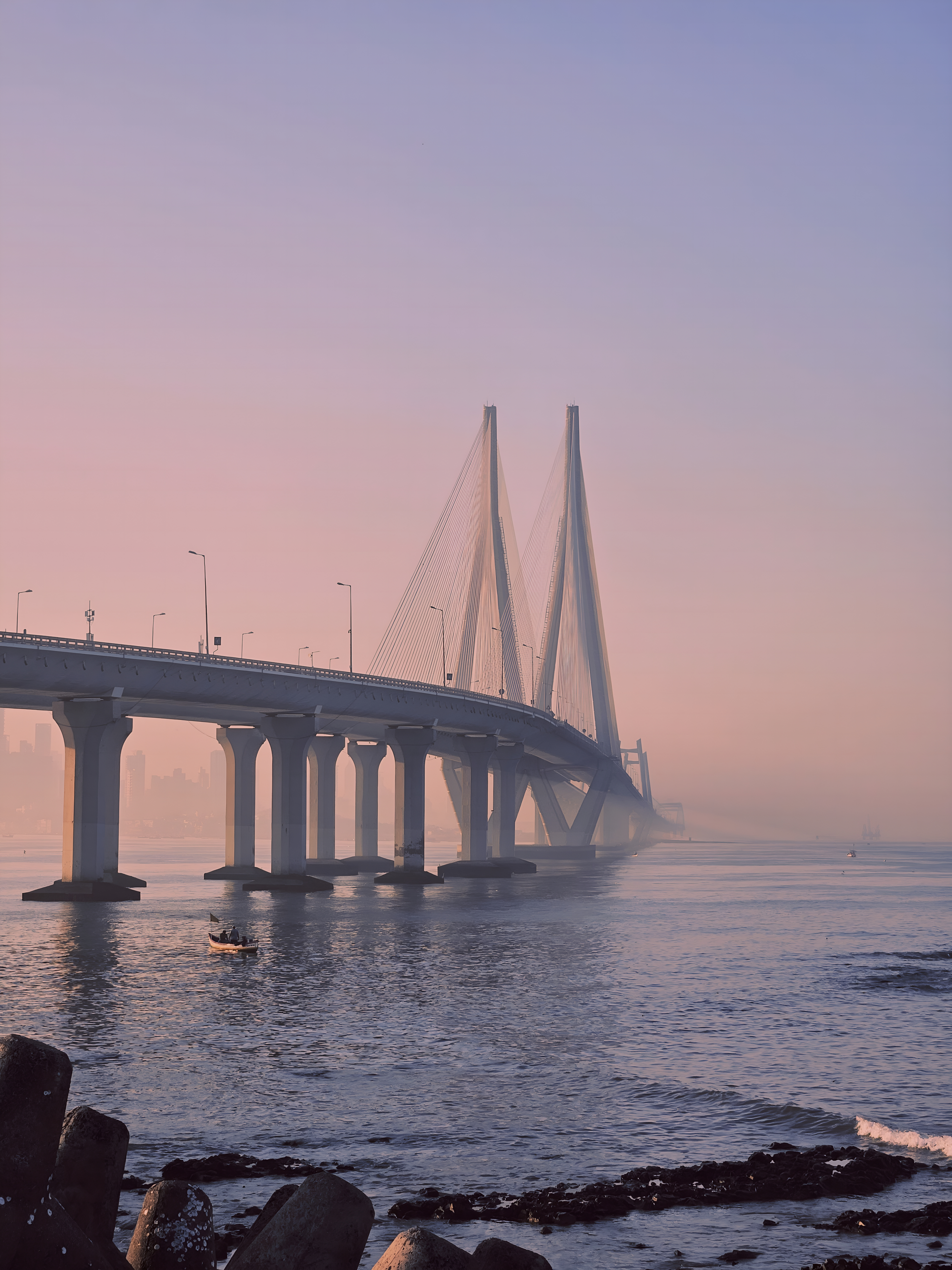
- View from Bandra Fort
- Coordinates: 19.0364°N 72.8172°E
- Carries: 8-lane (4 lanes in each direction)
- Crosses: Mahim Bay
- Locale: Mumbai, Maharashtra, India
- Official name: Rajiv Gandhi Sea Link
- Owner: Government of Maharashtra
- Maintained by: Maharashtra State Road Development Corporation (MSRDC)

Characteristics
- Design: Cable-stayed main spans; concrete-steel precast segment viaducts at either end
- Total length: 5.6 kilometres (3.5 mi)
- Width: 2 x 20 metres (66 ft)
- Height: 126 metres (413 ft)
- Longest span: 2 x 250 metres (820 ft)

History
- Designer: Akash Banerjee
- Constructed by: Hindustan Construction Company (HCC India)
- Construction start: 2000
- Construction end: 30 June 2009
- Opened: 24 March 2010

Statistics
- Toll: ₹85 (88¢ US) Car ₹110 (US$1.10) LCV ₹145 (US$1.50) Heavy vehicle

Location
- Interactive map of Bandra-Worli Sea Link

The Bandra–Worli Sea Link (officially known as Rajiv Gandhi Sea Link) is a 5.6 km long, 8-lane wide cable-stayed bridge that links Bandra in the Western Suburbs of Mumbai with Worli in South Mumbai. It is the second longest sea bridge after Mumbai Trans Harbour Link, as well as the 5th longest bridge in India after Mumbai Trans Harbour Link, Bhupen Hazarika Setu, Dibang River Bridge and Mahatma Gandhi Setu. It contains pre-stressed concrete-steel viaducts on either side. It was planned as a part of the proposed Western Freeway that would link the Western Suburbs to Nariman Point in Mumbai's main business district, but is now planned to become part of the Coastal Road to Kandivali.

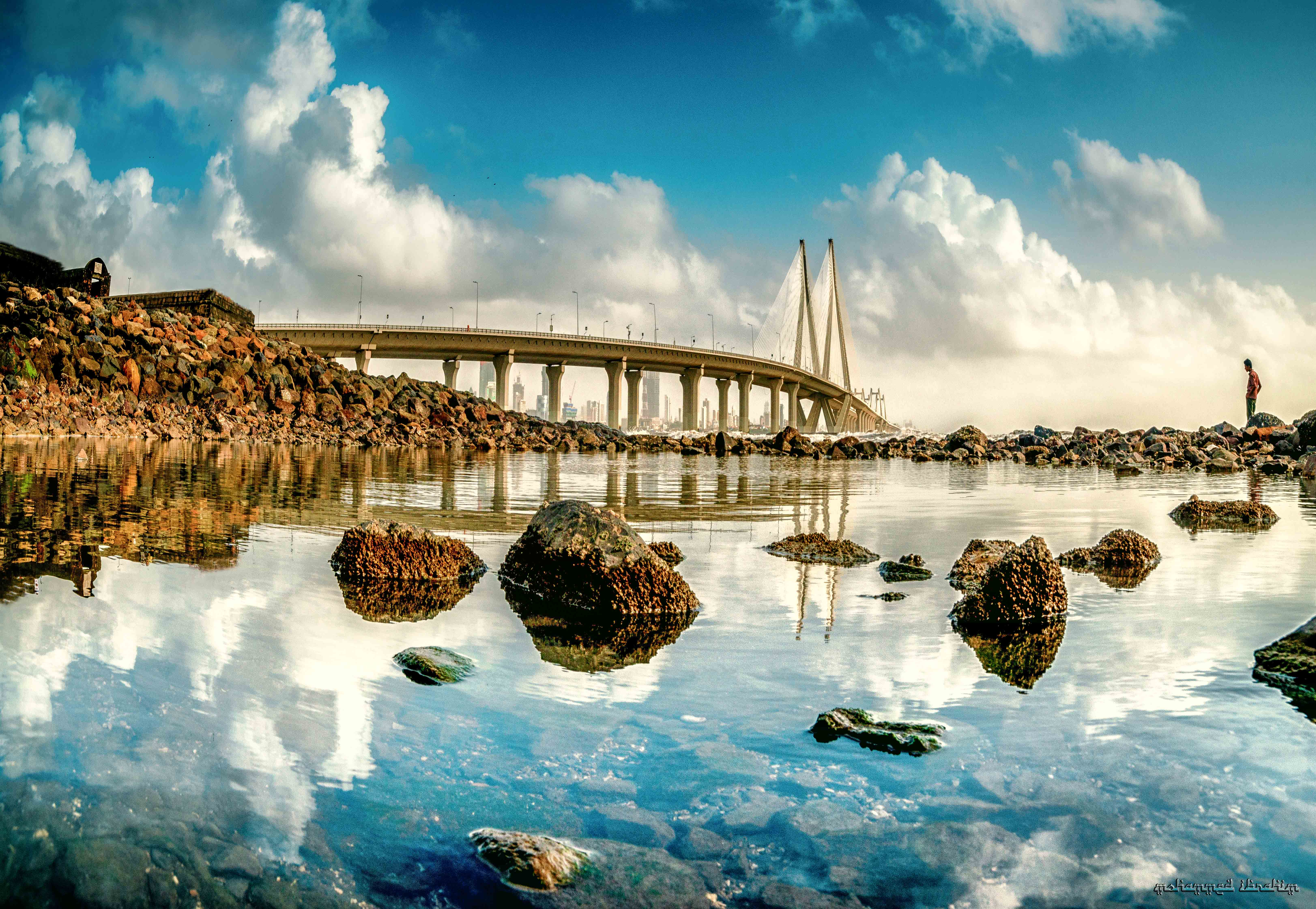
Bandra-Worli Sea Link During Early Monsoon

The 5.6 km (3.5 mi) bridge was commissioned by the Maharashtra State Road Development Corporation (MSRDC), and built by the Hindustan Construction Company. The first four of the eight lanes of the bridge were opened to the public on 30 June 2009. All eight lanes became operational on 24 March 2010.

The sea-link reduces travel time between Bandra and Worli during peak hours from 20 – 30 minutes to 10 minutes. As of 2018, BWSL had an average daily traffic of around 32,312 vehicles.

== History ==
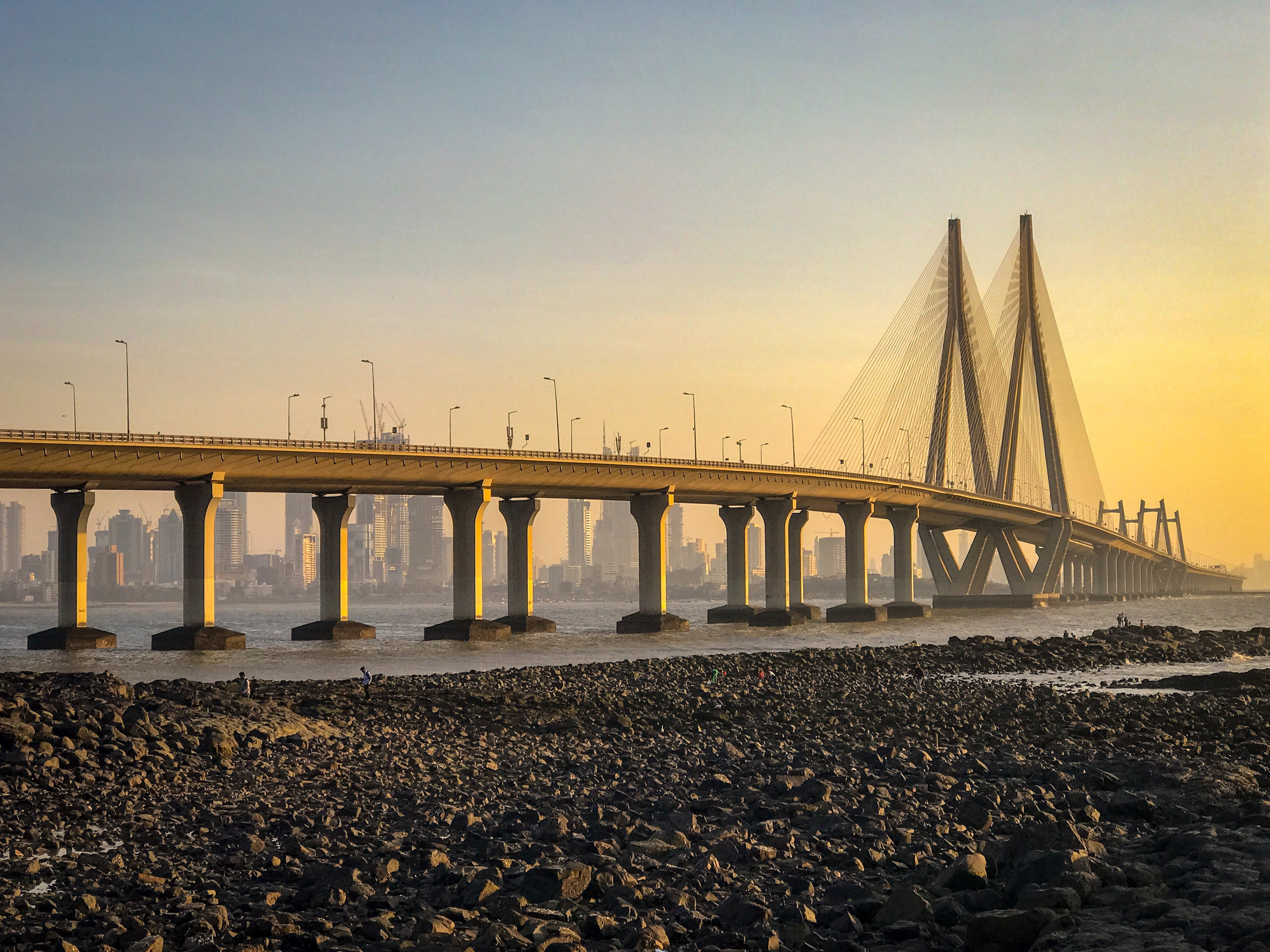
The Bandra–Worli Sea Link

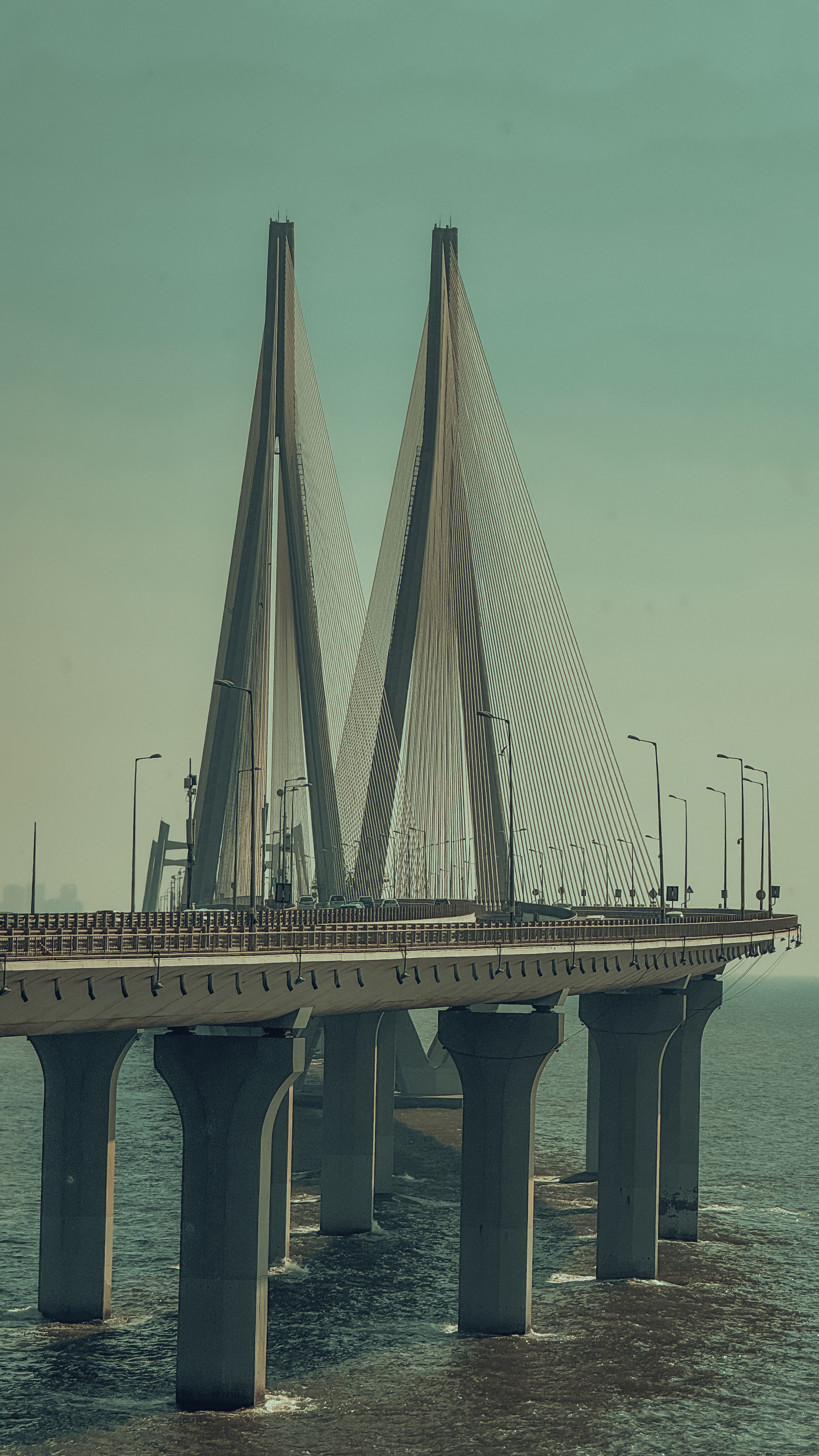
Northern viaduct of BWSL in the foreground seen against the Worli skyline. View from Bandra Fort

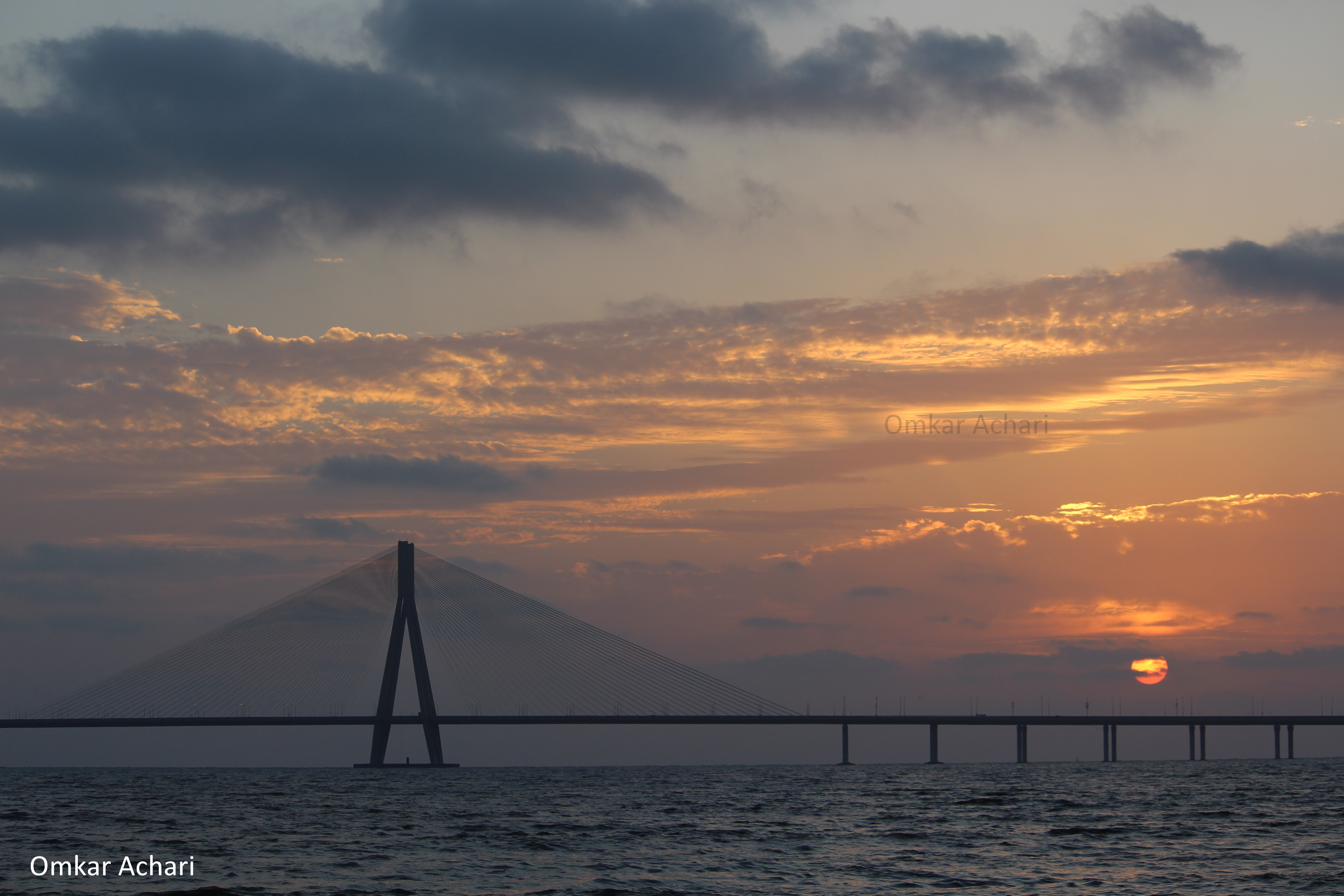
Sunset View of Bandra Worli Sea Link from Dadar Chowpatty spanning over Mahim Bay

Mahim Causeway was the only road connecting the western suburbs to Mumbai's central business district. This north-southwestern corridor became a bottleneck and was highly congested at peak hours. The Western Freeway project was proposed to span the entire western coastline of Mumbai to ease congestion. The Bandra–Worli Sea Link, a bridge over Mahim Bay, was proposed as the first phase of this freeway system, offering an alternative route to the Mahim Causeway.

The bridge connects the intersection of the Western Express Highway and Swami Vivekanand Road, in Bandra to the Khan Abdul Ghaffar Khan Road in Worli. From Worli Seaface, it connects to Mumbai's arterial Annie Besant Road.

The project was commissioned by the Maharashtra State Road Development Corporation Limited (MSRDC). The contract for construction was awarded to the Hindustan Construction Company (HCC), with project management led by the UK offices of Dar Al-Handasah.

The foundation stone was laid in 1999 by Basitt Acharwala. The original plan estimated the cost at ₹6.6 billion (US$69 million) to be completed in five years. But the project was subject to numerous public interest litigations, with the 5-year delay resulting in the cost escalating to ₹16 billion (US$170 million), with the additional interest cost alone accounting for ₹7 billion (US$73 million).

== Planning ==
The overall project consisted of five parts, contracted separately to accelerate the overall schedule.

- Package I(1): Construction of a flyover over Love Grove junction in Worli
- Package II(2): Construction of a cloverleaf interchange at the intersection of the Western Express Highway and S. V. Road in Bandra
- Package III(3): Construction of solid approach road from the interchange to the Toll Plaza on the Bandra side along with a public promenade
- Package IV(4): Construction of the central cable-stayed spans with northern and southern viaducts from Worli to the Toll Plaza at the Bandra end
- Package V(5): Improvements to Khan Abdul Ghaffar Khan Road

Package IV was the main phase, with the other packages providing supporting infrastructure.

=== Geology ===
Surveys of the seabed under the planned route were conducted before the bridge design commenced. The marine geology underneath the bridge consists of basalts, volcanic tuffs and breccias with some intertrappean deposits. These are overlain by completely weathered rocks and residual soil. The strength of these rocks range from extremely weak to extremely strong and their condition range from highly weathered and fractured, to fresh, massive and intact. The weathered rock beds are further overlain by transported soil, calcareous sandstone and thin bed of coarse grained conglomerate. The top of these strata are overlain by marine soil layer up to 9m thick consisting of dark brown clay silt with some fine sand overlying weathered, dark brown basaltic boulders embedded in the silt.

=== Design ===
BWSL was designed as the first cable-stayed bridge to be constructed in open seas in India. Due to the underlying geology, the pylons have a complex geometry and the main span over the Bandra channel is one of the longest spans of concrete deck attempted. Balancing these engineering complexities with the aesthetics of the bridge presented significant challenges for the project.

The superstructure of the viaducts were the heaviest precast segments to be built in India. They were built using a span-by-span method using overhead gantry through a series of vertical and horizontal curves.

The 20,000 tonne Bandra-end span of the bridge deck is supported by stay cables within a very close tolerance of deviations in plan and elevation.

The Bandra–Worli Sea Link was the first infrastructure project in Mumbai to use seismic arresters. These will enable it to withstand earthquakes measuring up to 7.0 on the Richter scale.

==== Foundation and substructure ====
The construction of the bridge's structure presented major engineering challenges. These included the highly variable geotechnical conditions due to the underlying marine geology of the seabed. At times, even for plan area of a single pile had a highly uneven foundation bed. Further complications included the presence of a variable intertidal zone, with parts of the foundation bed exposed in low tide and submerged in high tide.

The foundations for the BWSL's cable-stayed bridges consist of 120 reinforced concrete piles of 2,000 millimetres (6.6 ft) diameter. Those for the viaducts consist of 484 piles of 1,500 millimetres (4.9 ft). These 604 piles were driven between 6m and 34m into the substrate in geotechnical conditions that varied from highly weathered volcanic material to massive high strength rocks.

==== Pylon tower ====
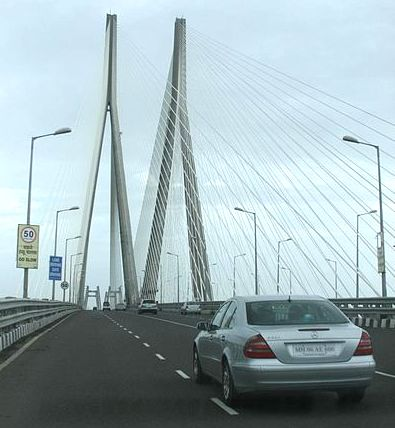
BWSL's largest pylon towers are 128 m (420 ft) high

The largest pylons for the bridge consist of diamond shaped 128 metres (420 ft) high concrete tower featuring flaring lower legs, converging upper legs, a unified tower head housing the stays and a continuously varying cross section along the height of tower.

The bridge's pylon towers gradually decrease in cross-section with height. They have horizontal grooves every 3m in height, which permitted inserts. Vertical grooves in the circular sections require special form liners, as well as require attention for de-shuttering. The tower legs are inclined in two directions, which presented challenges in alignment and climbing of soldiers. Construction joints were permitted at 3m intervals only.

To build the pylons, Doka of Austria was commissioned to build a custom automatic climbing shutter formwork system, based on their SKE-100 automatic climbing shutter system. This was fabricated on site and employed to execute all tower leg lifts below deck level.

=== Pre-cast yard ===
The pre-cast yard was located on reclaimed land. The yard catered to casting, storing and handling of 2342 concrete-steel pre-cast segments for the project. The storage capacity requirement of the yard was about 470 precast segments. As the area available was limited, the segments were stored in stacks of up to three layers.

== Structure ==
BWSL consists of twin continuous concrete box girder bridge sections for traffic in each direction. Each bridge section, except at the cable-stayed portion, is supported on piers typically spaced 50 metres (160 ft) apart. Each section is designed to support four lanes of traffic with break-down lanes and concrete barriers. Sections also provide for service side-walks on one side. The bridge alignment is defined with vertical and horizontal curves.

The bridge consists of three distinct parts: the north end viaduct, the central cable-stayed spans and the south end viaduct. Both the viaducts used precast segmental construction. The cable-stayed bridge on the Bandra channel has a 50m-250m-250m-50m span arrangement and on the Worli channel it has a 50m-50m-150m-50m-50m span arrangement.

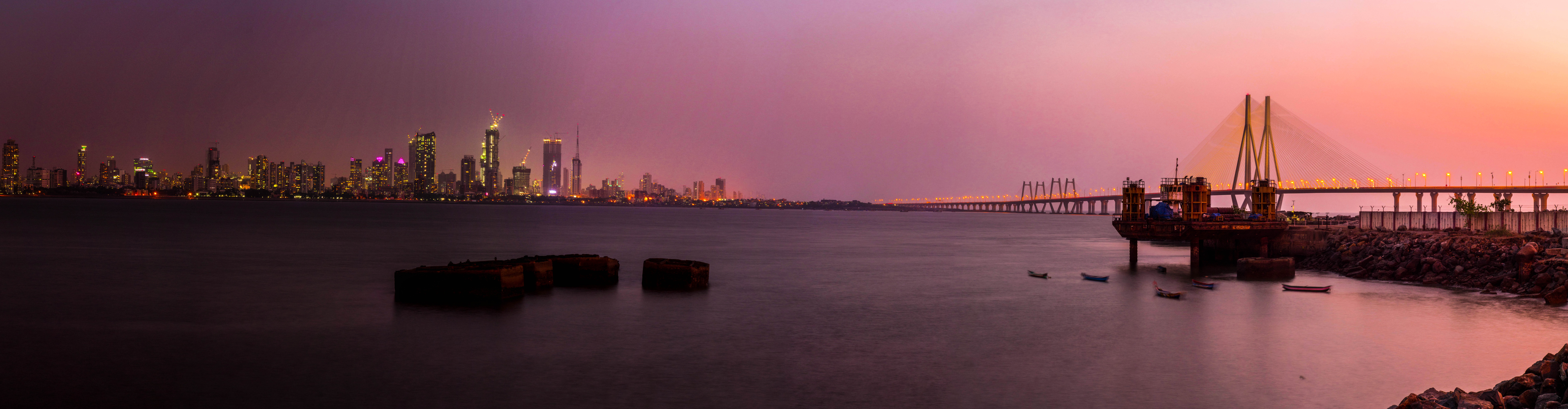
Bandra-Worli Sea Link with the Mumbai skyline in the background, at sunset

=== Northern and southern viaducts ===
The viaducts on either side of the central cable-stayed spans are arranged in 300-metre (980 ft) units consisting of six continuous spans of 50 metres (160 ft) each. Expansion joints are provided at each end of the units. The superstructure and substructure are designed in accordance with IRC codes. Specifications conform to the IRC standard with supplementary specifications covering special items. The foundation consists of 1.5 metres (4 ft 11 in) diameter drilled piles (four for each pier) with pile caps. Bridge bearings are of disc type. The modular expansion joints for the bridge were provided by the Swiss civil engineering firm Mageba.

The viaducts were built utilising pre-cast, post-tensioned, segmental concrete-steel box girder sections. An overhead gantry crane with self-launching capability was custom built on the site to lay the superstructure of the precast segments. The Pre-Cast segments are joined using high strength epoxy glue with nominal pre-stressing initially. The end segments adjacent to the pier are short segments "cast-in-situ joints". Geometrical adjustments of the span are made before primary continuous tendons are stressed.

Segment types are further defined by the changes in the web thickness and type of diaphragms cast in cell. The segment weights vary from 110 to 140 tonnes (110 to 140 long tons; 120 to 150 short tons) per segment. The segment length varies from 3,000 to 3,200 mm (9.8 to 10.5 ft). Deck post tensioning is performed at the completion of the erection of each 50-metre (160 ft) bridge span.

=== Cable-stayed spans ===
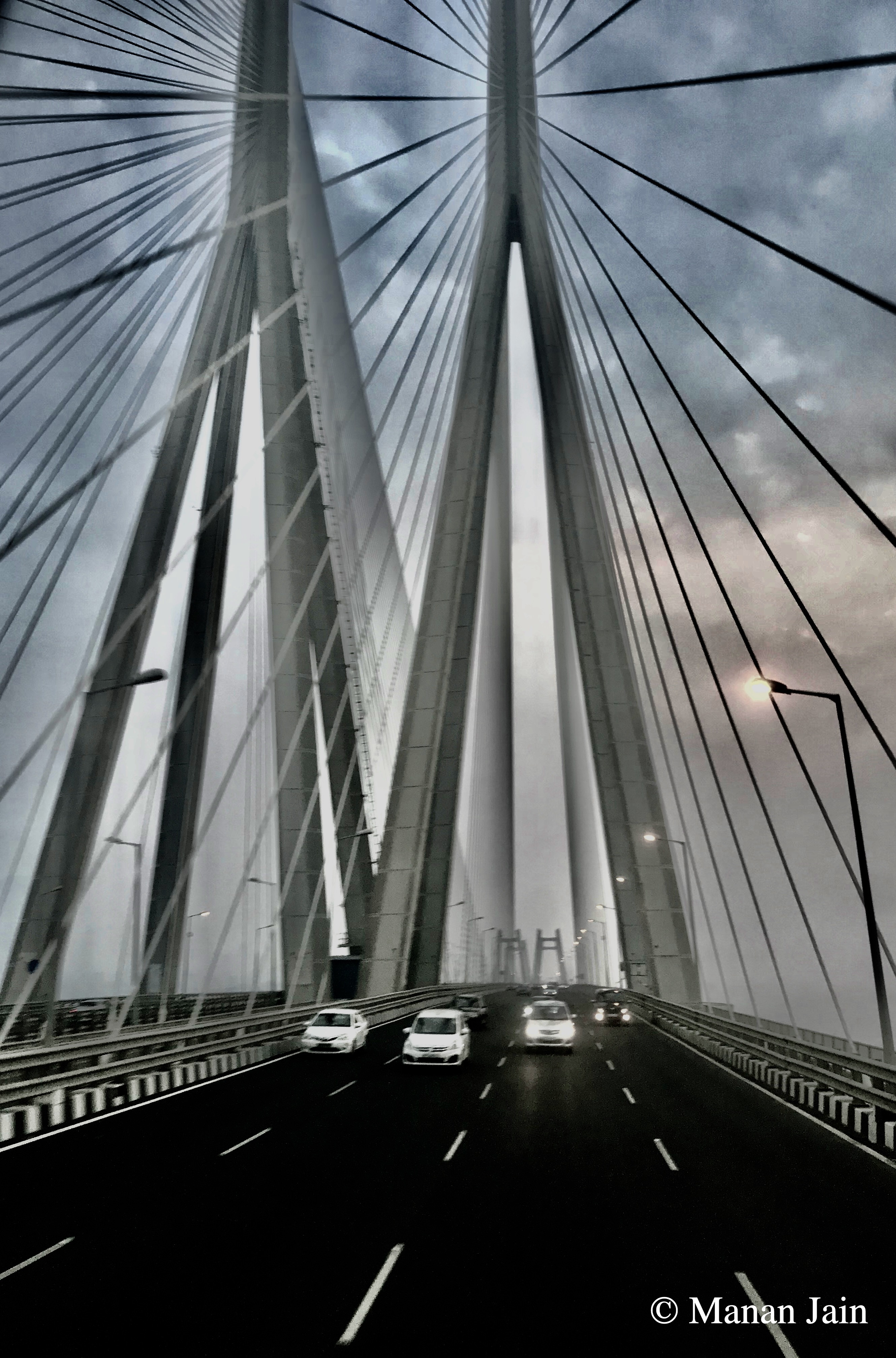
Main cable-stayed span

The cable-stayed portion of the Bandra channel is 600 metres (2,000 ft) in length between expansion joints and consists of two 250-metre cable supported main spans flanked by 50 metres conventional approach spans. A centre tower, with an overall height of 128 metres above pile cap level, supports the superstructure by means of four planes of cable stay in a semi-harp arrangement. Cable spacing is 6.0 metres along the bridge deck.

The cable-stayed portion of the Worli channel is 250 metres (820 ft) in length between expansion joints and consists of one 150 metres cable supported main span flanked on each side by two 50 metres conventional approach spans. A centre tower, with an overall height of 55 metres, supports the superstructure above the pile cap level by means of four planes of cable stay in a semi-harp arrangement. Cable spacing here is also 6.0 metres along the bridge deck.

The superstructure comprises twin precast concrete box girders with a fish belly cross sectional shape, identical to the approaches. A typical Pre-Cast segment length is 3.0 metres with the heaviest superstructure segment approaching 140 tonnes. Balanced cantilever construction is used for erecting the cable supported superstructure as compared to span-by-span construction for the approaches. For every second segment, cable anchorages are provided.

A total of 264 cable stays are used at Bandra channel with cable lengths varying from approximately 85 metres to nearly 250 metres. The tower is cast in-situ reinforced concrete using the climbing form method of construction. The overall tower configuration is an inverted "Y" shape with the inclined legs oriented along the axis of the bridge. Tower cable anchorage recesses are achieved by use of formed pockets and transverse and longitudinal bar post-tensioning is provided in the tower head to resist local cable forces.

A total of 160 cable stays are used at Worli channel with cable lengths varying from approximately 30 metres minimum to nearly 80 metres maximum. Like the Bandra channel, the tower here is also cast in-situ reinforced concrete using the climbing form method of construction but the overall tower configuration is "I" shape with the inclined legs. Similarly, tower cable anchorage recesses are achieved by use of formed pockets.

The foundations for the main tower comprise 2-metre-drilled shafts of 25-metre length each. Cofferdam and tremie seal construction have been used to construct the six-metre deep foundation in the dry.

== Management of the bridge ==
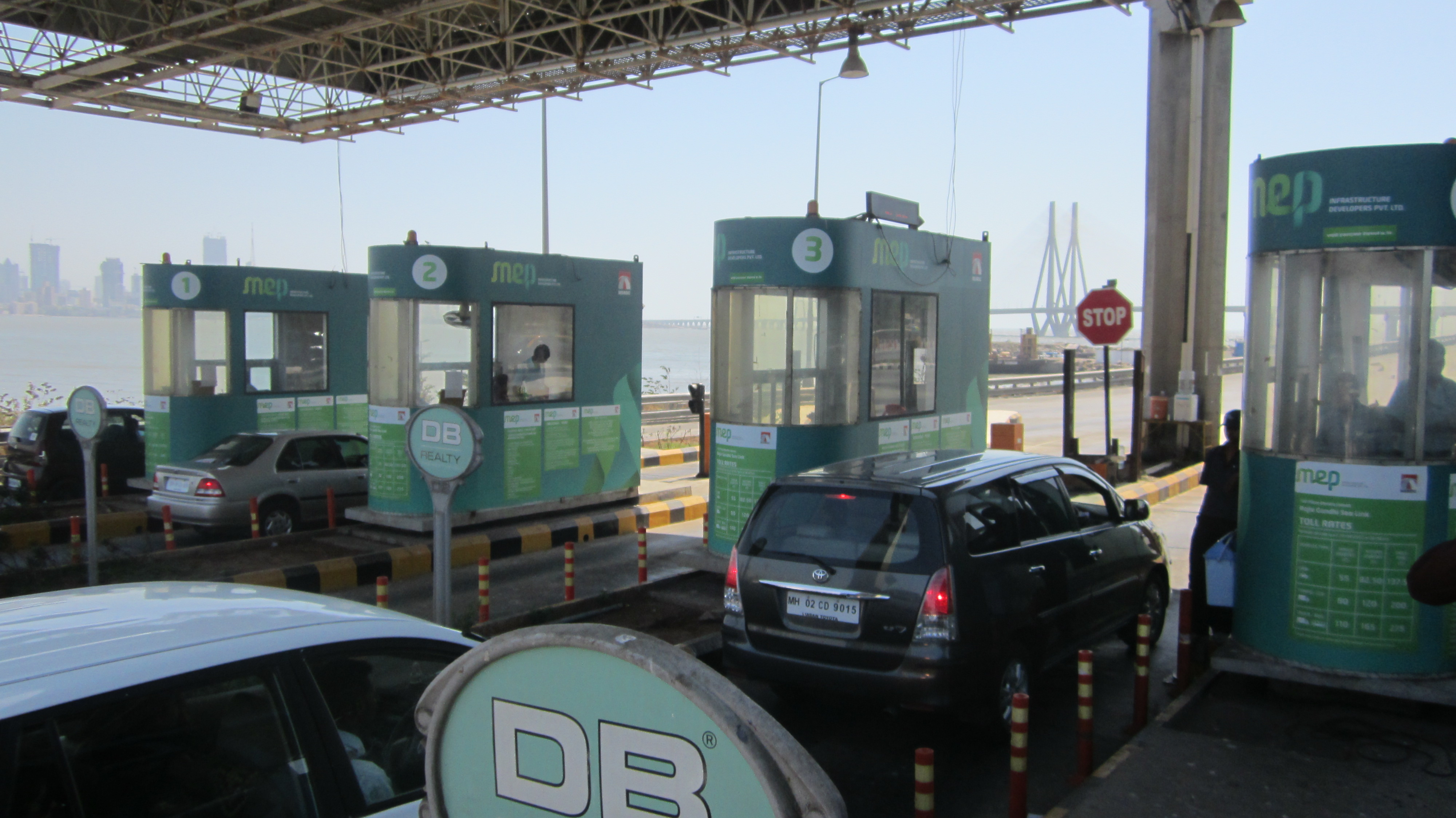
Toll gates of Bandra-Worli Sea Link

=== Toll collection ===
The Bandra end of the toll plaza has 16 approach lanes. The toll plaza is equipped with an electronic toll collection system.

At both ends, the toll collection options include:

- Automatic electronic payment system through On-board Units mounted on vehicles for frequent-commuters that enable vehicles to pass without stopping
- Semi-automatic cash-less electronic payment via a smart card in unattended lanes
- Manual toll collection for payment by cash, to a toll attendant

Vehicle	Toll (Applicable: 01/April/2021)		
Vehicle	Single Journey	Return Journey	Day Pass
Car	₹85 (88¢ US)	₹127.5 (US$1.30)	₹212.5 (US$2.20)
Tempo/LCV	₹130 (US$1.30)	₹195 (US$2.00)	₹325 (US$3.40)
Truck/Bus	₹175 (US$1.80)	₹262.5 (US$2.70)	₹437.5 (US$4.50)

=== Power supply and lighting ===
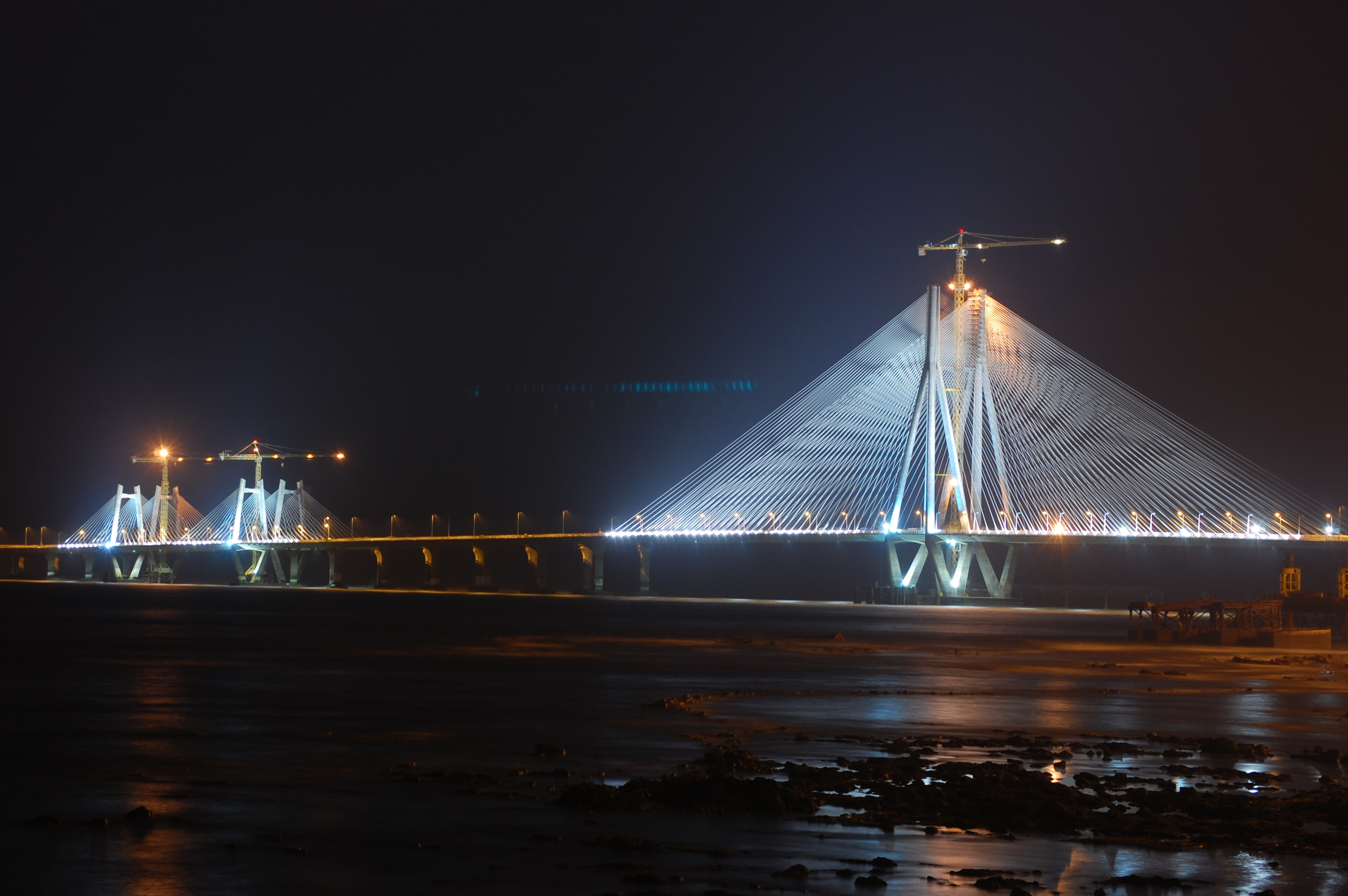
The Bandra-Worli Sea Link main cable span lit up for first time during construction.

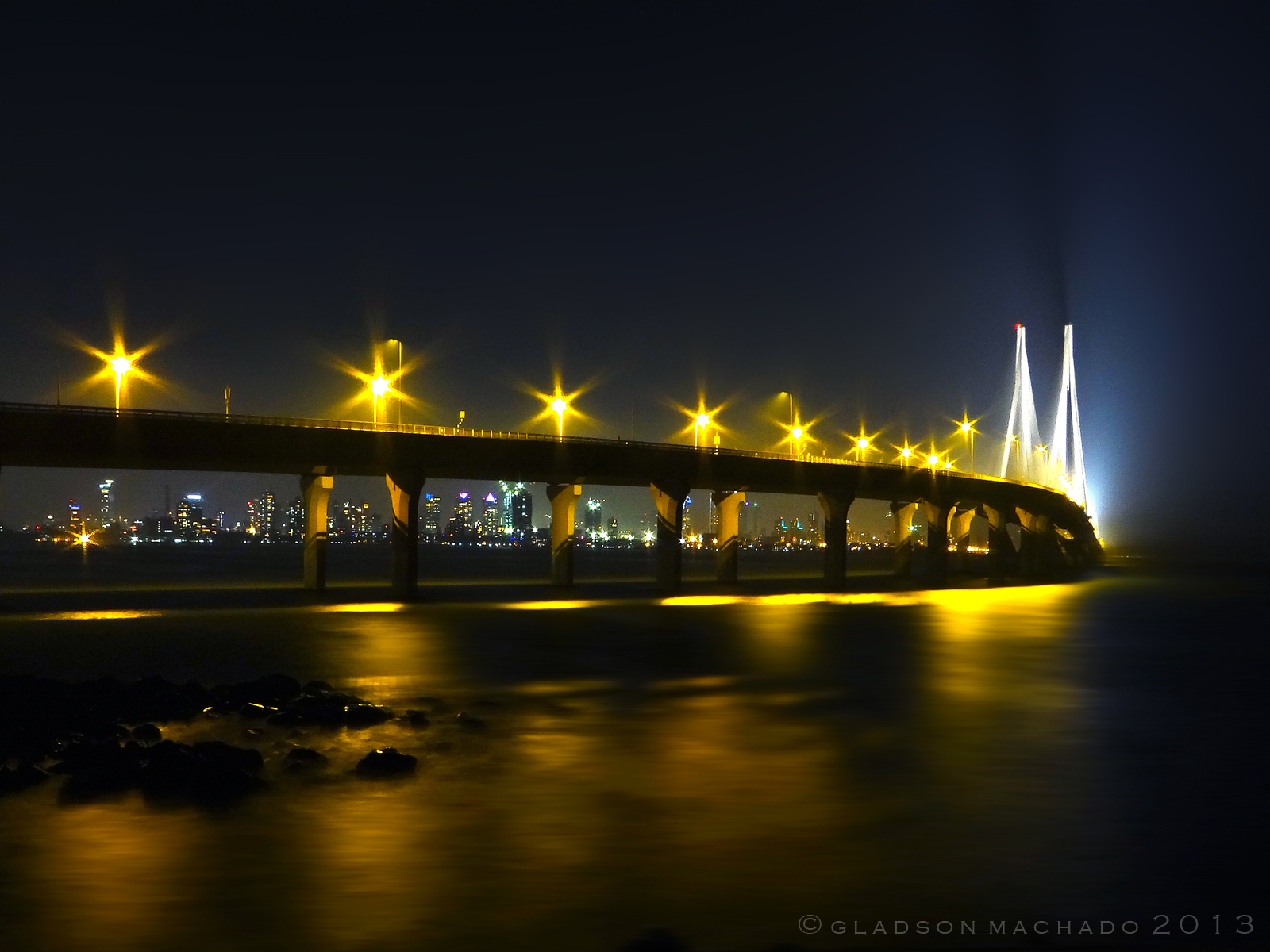
An illuminated Bandra-Worli Sea Link Worli Skyline.

The bridge has a reliable and redundant power supply, backed up by diesel generators and auto mains failure panels for critical loads, such as monitoring, surveillance, emergency equipment and communication services including aviation and obstruction indicators. BWSL exclusively uses energy saving illumination systems.

=== Surveillance and security ===
An intelligent bridge management system (IBS) provides traffic information, surveillance, monitoring and control systems. It comprises CCTVs, automatic traffic counters and vehicle classification system, variable message signs, remote weather information system and emergency telephones. The control centre is located near the toll plaza along with the electronic tolling controls. The control system uses fibre-optic cables running the entire span of the BWSL. Toll and advanced traffic management systems were installed.

For traffic enforcement, the bridge includes facilities for vehicles to pull over when stopped by enforcement officers or in the event of a breakdown. The bridge uses mobile explosive scanners for vehicles travelling on the sea link. Scans take less than 20 seconds for each vehicle with sensors above and below the vehicles. Over 180 cars can be scanned per hour by each scanner.

The pillars and the towers supporting the bridge are protected by buoys designed to withstand explosions and collisions. These inflated buoys surround each pillar of the sea link to avoid any damage.

The BWSL is insured by New India Assurance.

The bridge tower and the control centres feature lightning protection, designed to protect the bridge monitoring, communication and power equipment from possible surges.

=== Accessibility ===
Due to Safety considerations, the BWSL is not accessible to pedestrians, and was not designed for them, according to the MSRDC's Satish Gavai. Two-wheeled, including motorbikes and pedal bicycles, and three-wheeled vehicles are prohibited as well. If caught, riders of such vehicles are subjected to a penalty of ₹1200. Despite stringent security measures, there have been instances where bicyclists and pedestrians have entered from Worli side, as there is no toll booth present to prevent their entry, despite the presence of signages or warnings against entry of bicyclists and pedestrians. Patrolling is enforced however, to keep a check on such incidents.

The exception to allow bicyclists on Bandra Worli Sea Link is only on the World Environment Day, where mass cycling is organized every year by Mumbai Police, or on days where permission is granted for various causes. On rest of the days of the year however, bicyclists can be penalized for riding on the Sea Link. However, citing the non provision of bicycles in the Motor Vehicles Act and the non requirement of licenses, riders have refused to pay penalties after being pulled over. The other tactic by the traffic cops to deter bicyclists from entering is seizing and impounding of bicycles as well as to deflate their tires along with detention of riders, which has earned criticism and ire, as it constitutes an act of misconduct by police personnel and violation of rights of those owning non-motorized vehicles.

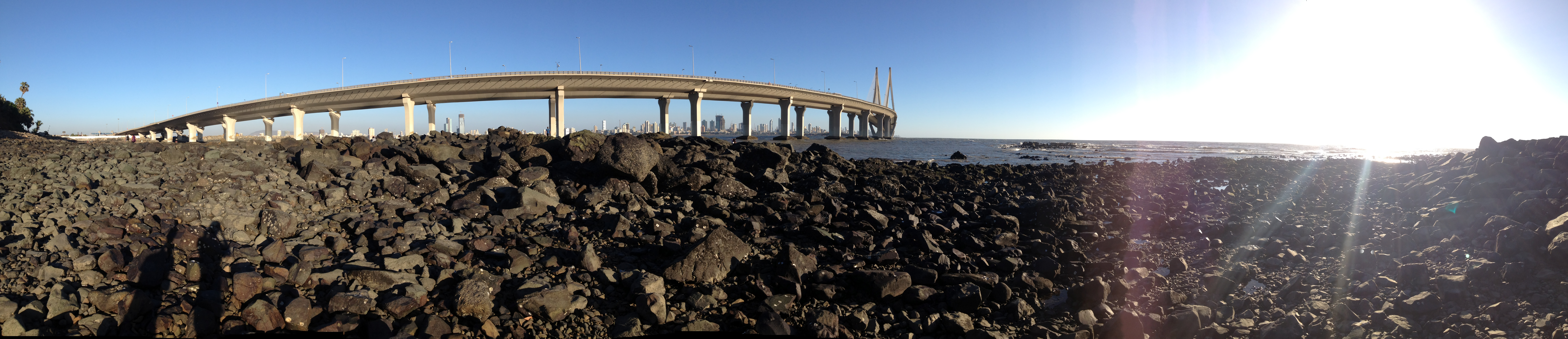
Panorama Shot of the Bandra-Worli Sea Link (Mumbai)

== Criticisms ==
The Economic Times criticized the delays and shoddy construction of Bandra–Worli Sea Link. First, the cost was not the projected ₹3 billion but actually cost ₹16 billion. Second, the project was five years behind schedule.

The Financial Express has reported that even eight years after it was thrown open, the daily average traffic on the Bandra–Worli Sea Link — is smaller than a third of the original estimate. In fact, the increase in revenues over the years — ₹66.62 crore in 2010–2011 to ₹70.28 crore in 2011–2012 and to ₹71.04 crore 2012–2013 — has been fairly small. Latest statistics show the daily traffic count on the six-kilometre, predominantly cable-stayed bridge has dropped by over 11% in the past year, from 45,952 vehicles in 2011–2012 to 40,808 in 2012–2013. Over four years from 2009 to 2013, the daily vehicle count has dropped by over 16%. High toll is considered a major contributing factor to people finding the bridge, a less attractive commuting option. Also blamed are congestion towards Pedder Road for south-bound traffic and new flyovers that move north–south traffic on the eastern flank of the city, especially the 2.6 km Lalbaug flyover.

There was also criticism directed at the crumbling road surface on the bridge soon after completion.

The capacity of the bridge is restricted due to a bottleneck at the Worli (south) end of the bridge. While the majority of the 4.7 km (2 7/8 mi) length has four lanes in each direction, the Worli end has only two lanes for a length of approximately 1.2 km (3/4 mi). This leads to backlogs for southbound traffic, especially during morning peak hours. However, linking the Sea Link to the Coastal Road solved majority of the problem, with an interchange constructed for entry on the Sea Link.

Although restricted for two and three-wheelers, there have been instances where bicyclists who entered the bridge from the Worli side have been slapped hefty penalties under various sections of the Motor Vehicles Act by traffic police personnel. The action is deemed unconstitutional and constitutes as a misuse of power and corruption, as bicyclists cannot be penalized under any sections of the Motor Vehicles Act, even for the violation of entering the bridge.

== See also ==
- Versova–Bandra Sea Link
- Vikhroli-Koparkhairane Link Road
- Coastal Road (Mumbai)
- Worli-Haji Ali Sea Link
- Mumbai Trans Harbour Link
- Hancock Bridge
- List of longest bridges in the world
