= Versova–Bandra Sea Link =

Bridge in India

Versova–Bandra Sea Link Vesave-Vandre Sagari Setu
- Carries: Motor vehicles
- Crosses: Arabian Sea
- Locale: Mumbai, Maharashtra, India
- Begins: Versova
- Ends: Bandra
- Official name: Swatantrya Veer Savarkar Sea Link (स्वातंत्र्यवीर सावरकर सागरी सेतू)
- Owner: MSRDC
- Preceded by: Versova–Virar Sea Link
- Followed by: Bandra–Worli Sea Link

Characteristics
- Design: 3 Cantilever spans 1 Cable-stayed span
- Material: Concrete and steel
- Total length: 17.17 kilometres (10.67 mi); main sea bridge 9.6 kilometres (6.0 mi) ONLY
- Width: 28 metres (92 ft)
- Longest span: 300 metres (980 ft)
- No. of lanes: 4 in each direction

History
- Engineering design by: Dar Al-Handasah
- Constructed by: APCO Infratech (70%); Webuild (30%)
- Construction start: 2019
- Construction end: 2027
- Construction cost: ₹11,333 crore (US$1.3 billion)
- Opening: August 2027

Statistics
- Daily traffic: 60,000-70,000 vehicles (2023 estimate)

The Versova–Bandra Sea Link (VBSL), officially Swatantrya Veer Savarkar Sea Link, is an under-construction bridge in Mumbai, Maharashtra, India as a part of Coastal Road Phase-3 or Western Coastal Road. The 17.17-kilometre (10.67 mi) bridge will connect Versova, a neighbourhood in the suburb of Andheri to the Bandra–Worli Sea Link in Bandra, as part of the Coastal Road. The 8-lane sea link is expected to reduce congestion on the Western Express Highway and the Western Line of the Mumbai Suburban Railway.

== History ==
The prefeasibility study for the Versova–Bandra Sea Link (VBSL) was conducted by CES (I) Pvt. Ltd in 2007–2008. The Government of Maharashtra appointed the Maharashtra State Road Development Corporation (MSRDC) as the nodal agency for the project on 19 December 2009. The Versova–Bandra Sea Link received environmental clearance, under certain conditions, from the Ministry of Environment and Forests in January 2013. A cabinet sub-committee on infrastructure chaired by then Maharashtra Chief Minister Prithviraj Chavan cleared the project on 15 January 2014. The project had been pending for approval from the State Government for the past four years. Some observers felt that the move was an attempt to keep the Nationalist Congress Party (NCP) happy prior to the 2014 general election, as this project and the Pune Ring Road project which was also approved the sub-committee, would be undertaken by the NCP-led MSRDC. The fate of the sea link had been uncertain after Chavan said that coastal roads were less expensive to build. Chavan had also stated that he favoured coastal roads because they had less environmental hurdles than a sea link. Brihanmumbai Municipal Corporation officials stated that the government had not clarified the future of the Coastal Road project, after approving the VBSL.

The MSRDC invited request for qualifications from companies interested in constructing the VBSL on 2 March 2014. The agency conducted a pre-bid conference for potential bidders on 28 March. The last date for the submission of technical bids was fixed as 30 May, and the MSRDC planned to open technical bids on 31 May 2014, as per the tender notice. The MSRDC estimated the project concession period to be 35 years in the absence of any viability gap funding (the state's financial contribution in a PPP project). However, after some members of the infrastructure sub-committee expressed reservations about the long concession period, the corporation decided to seek 20% from the Union Government, which the MSRDC estimated would reduce the concession period to about 28–30 years. However, the project was put on hold after the Maharashtra Government began promoting the Coastal Road project. On 29 April 2016, the State Government decided to resume implementation of the VBSL.

The MSRDC received environmental clearance for the project from the State Environment Impact Assessment Authority (SEIAA) in February 2017. The Louis Berger Group was awarded a ₹109 crore (US$13 million) contract to provide project management services for the VBSL project in January 2018. The company conducted the feasibility study, prepared tenders and reviewed construction on the project. A joint venture between Reliance Infrastructure and Italian construction company Astaldi was awarded the engineering, procurement and construction contract worth ₹6,993.99 crore (US$830 million) to build the VBSL in May 2018. Larsen & Toubro and ITD Cementation also participated in the bidding for the VBSL placing higher bids of ₹7,600 crore (US$900 million) and ₹7,300 crore (US$860 million) respectively. The agreement was signed between the winning consortium and the MSRDC on 4 September 2018, and a deadline of 24 June 2023 was set for completing the project. The MSRDC also announced that it had appointed the Louis Berger Group to design three connecting roads to link the Versova–Bandra Sea Link with key roads near its entry and exit points. Construction on the project must be halted for three months every year during the monsoon season. The Maharashtra Maritime Board prohibits work in the sea during monsoon due to the potential safety risk for workers.

On 26 February 2019, the Maharashtra Coastal Zone Management Authority (MCZMA) approved the setting up of a casting yard at Juhu Beach for the project. Activist Zoru Bhathena filed a petition challenging the decision in the Bombay High Court. The Court cancelled the permission granted by the MCZMA citing a violation of coastal regulation zone (CRZ) guidelines on 26 April. The MSRDC filed a special leave petition appealing the order in the Supreme Court. On 9 May, the two-judge bench of the Supreme Court upheld the High Court's verdict. The MSRDC withdrew its special leave petition, and stated that it would it file a writ petition seeking permission from the High Court to set up the casting yard. If the petition is denied the agency will have to find alternate land for the casting yard, which would delay the start of construction. The agency filed a review petition with the High Court on 30 August. MSRDC officials stated that they were also exploring the possibility of renting land temporarily for use as a casting yard in case the review petition failed. The agency also requested the National Environmental Engineering Research Institute to conduct an environment assessment report on the proposed casting yard. The issue concerning the casting yard was finally resolved in July 2020 when the MSRDC allocated an alternate plot in Malad. The 10 acre plot of land was leased from a private landowner at an annual rent of ₹34 crore (US$4.0 million), which is borne equally by the MSRDC and the contractors.

Construction work on the project was impacted by the COVID-19 pandemic which caused delays due to labour shortages and other factors. Progress on the project was very slow, with the consortium only completing about 2.07% of the total project work as of 15 August 2021, as opposed to Reliance's claims of completing the project within 60 months from June 2019. Due to the slow progress, the MSRDC began imposing a penalty of ₹3.5 crore (US$410,000) per day on Reliance Infrastructure from 1 September 2021. In January 2022, Reliance exited the project by selling its shares to Astaldi's subsidiary, Webuild. After Reliance's exit, Webuild appointed Gurugram-based APCO Infratech as its new partner. Aiming to speed up progress on the project, MSRDC provided the contractors with a second casting yard in August 2022. The yard, which is owned by the MSRDC, is located on an 82,000 square metre plot near its headquarters in Bandra. The agency charged contractors a nominal annual rent of ₹1 to use the yard.

The final legal challenge against the environmental clearance granted to the VBSL project was dismissed by the National Green Tribunal (NGT) on 22 August 2022. However, a petition filed by Dileep V. Nevatia in 2017 challenging the environmental clearance was still pending before the NGT. On 25 January 2023, the NGT ruled that despite its previous rulings, the petitioner had the right to be heard as he was not a party to the previous appeals. However, on 17 March 2023, the Supreme Court stayed the legal proceedings at the NGT. The Court cited the legal doctrine of res judicata and ruled that "the same issue cannot be agitated again and again". The project's CRZ clearance expired in January 2023. The MCZMA recommended its renewal in March 2023, and the renewal was approved by the Ministry of Environment, Forest and Climate Change in May 2023. The Ministry appointed the Zoological Survey of India to monitor the impact on marine life and the Indian Institute of Science Education and Research, Pune to conserve mangroves during the construction period. About 8% of the total project work had been completed as of May 2023.

== Alignment ==
The Versova–Bandra Sea Link has a total length of 17.17 km (10.67 mi) and forms part of the Coastal Road that links Marine Lines with Kandivali. It connects the Bandra-end of the Bandra–Worli Sea Link with Nana Nani Park in Versova. It also provides interchanges with Carter Road and Juhu providing a total of 4 entry/exit points.

The main sea link bridge is 9.60 km (5.97 mi) in length with 4 lanes in each direction. It also houses a 24-lane toll plaza. Connectors on either end of the main bridge link it with Bandra and Versova. The Bandra connector is 1.17 km in length with 2 lanes in each direction, while the Versova connector is 1.80 km in length with 3 lanes in each direction. The Versova connector also houses an 18-lane toll plaza.

The main sea link bridge also has two interchanges connecting it with Carter Road and Juhu Koliwada. The Carter Road connector is 1.80 km in length, has 3 lanes in each direction and houses an 18-lane toll plaza. The Juhu Koliwada connector is 2.80 km in length, has 2 lanes in each direction and houses a 12-lane toll plaza.

== Cost ==
The cost of the project was originally estimated as ₹4,045 crore (US$480 million) in 2012. This escalated to ₹4,340 crore (US$510 million) in 2013, ₹5,975 crore (US$710 million) in 2014, and ₹6,993.99 crore (US$830 million) when construction began in 2019. The cost was estimated to be ₹11,333 crore (US$1.3 billion) in 2023.

MSRDC Vice Chairman Radheshyam Mopalwar stated that tolls would be collected on the sea link until 2052. The toll rates are expected to thrice the rates on the Bandra-Worli Sea Link as the Versova Bandra Sea Link is thrice as long.
