= Worli =

District of central Mumbai, India

Worli Varaḷī
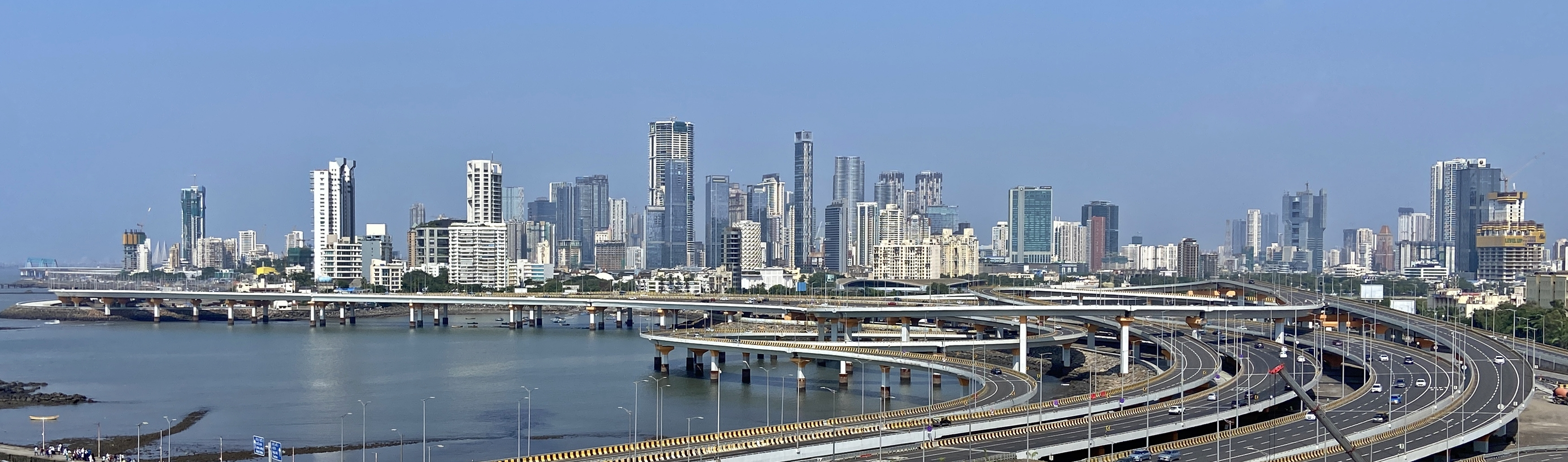
- Worli Skyline

- Location within Mumbai
- Coordinates: 19.00°N 72.815°E
- Country: India
- State: Maharashtra
- District: Mumbai City
- City: Mumbai

Government
  - Type: Municipal Corporation
  - Body: Brihanmumbai Municipal Corporation (BMC)
- Demonym(s): Worlikar, Varaḷīkar

Languages
  - Official: Marathi
- Time zone: UTC+5:30
- PIN: 400018 and 400030
- Area code: 022
- Vehicle registration: MH 01

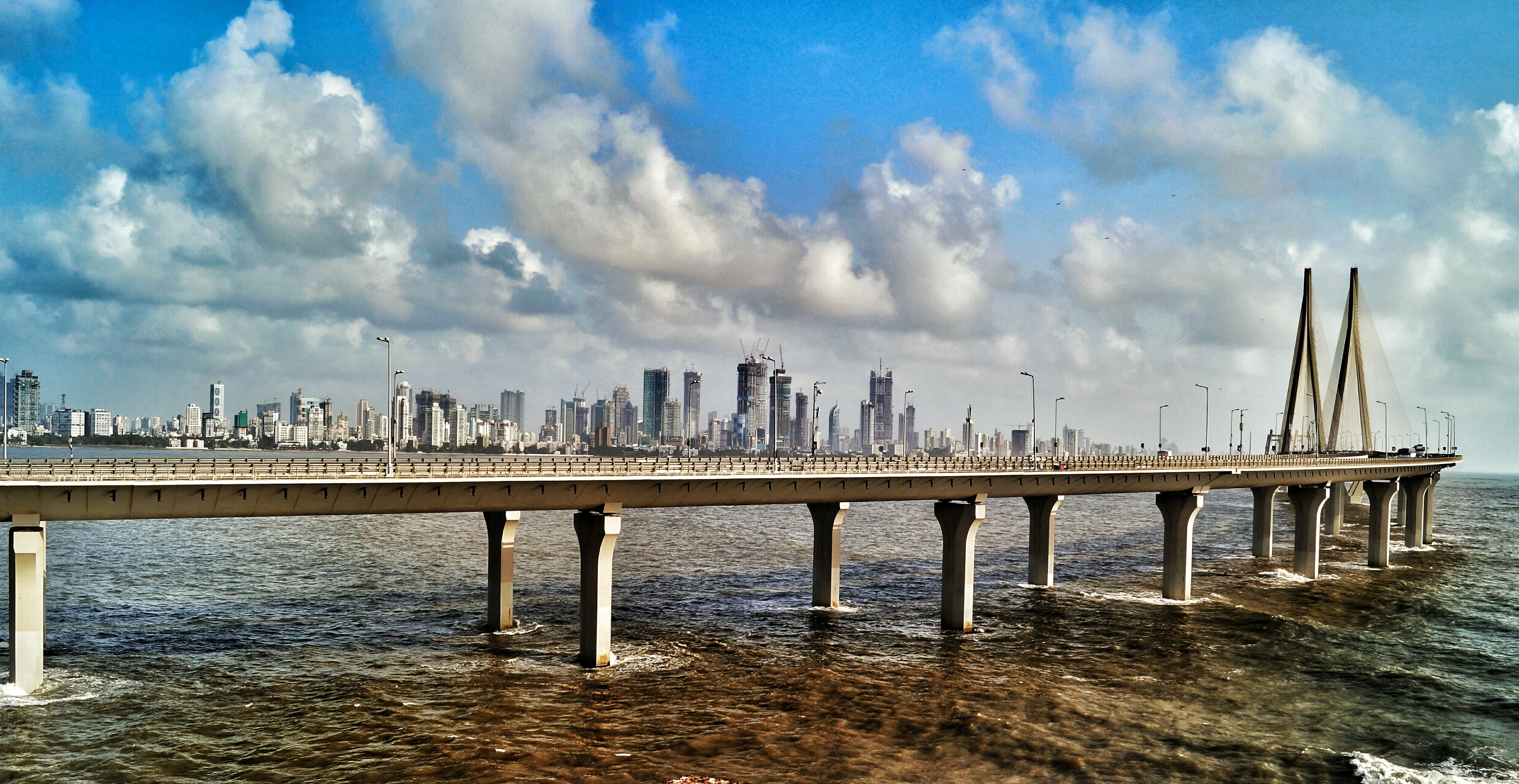
Bandra–Worli Sea Link, with Worli skyline

Worli (ISO: Varaḷī, [ʋəɾ(ə)ɭiː]) is a locality in central Mumbai, in Maharashtra, India. It is one of the four peninsulas of Mumbai, with the others being Colaba, Bandra, and Malabar Hill. The sea connects it with Bandra via the Bandra–Worli Sea Link. Historic spellings include Warli, Worlee, Varli, and Varel. Originally, Worli was a separate island—one of the Seven Islands of Bombay—which were ceded by the Portuguese to England in 1661; it was linked up with the other islands in the 19th century.

It was one of the places targeted in the 1993 bomb blasts.

== Geography and location ==
Worli is located along the western coastline of Mumbai, bordered by the Arabian Sea to the west, Lower Parel to the east, Prabhadevi to the north, and Haji Ali to the south. The neighbourhood enjoys a prime location and excellent connectivity via major roads and railway lines.

== History ==
Worli was originally a fishing village inhabited by the Koli community. During British rule, Worli underwent significant urbanisation and became an important part of Mumbai’s development. The construction of major infrastructure projects, including the Bandra-Worli Sea Link, further boosted its importance in the city's landscape. The Mumbai Police and BPT set up their quarters near Worli Seaface in the 1970s.

== Notable landmarks ==
=== Bandra-Worli Sea Link ===
A landmark cable-stayed bridge that connects Worli to Bandra, reducing travel time and enhancing connectivity between South Mumbai and the western suburbs.

=== Worli Fort ===
Built by the British in the 17th century, Worli Fort is an important historical monument that overlooks the Arabian Sea.

=== Palais Royale ===
Palais Royale, located close to Acharya Atre Chowk metro station is the tallest topped-out building in Mumbai and in India. The building was topped out in 2018 but remains to be completed, as of October 2026.

=== Worli Promenade ===
The construction of the Coastal Road has created 70 hectares (0.70 km^{2}) of reclaimed land, which is planned to be used for green and recreational areas. A 7.47 km long and 20 metre wide contiguous promenade runs parallel to the Coastal Road, on its seaward side, from Priyadarshini Park to the Worli end of the Bandra–Worli Sea Link. It is twice the length of Marine Drive, which is currently the city's longest promenade. In August 2025, the BMC opened the first 5.5 km stretch of the promenade to the public as part of a phased rollout of the full 7.5 km seafront walkway.

== Transportation ==
Worli is well-connected by various modes of transportation:

=== Roadways ===
The area is accessible via key roads such as:

- Bandra–Worli Sea Link
- Coastal Road (Mumbai)
- Annie Besant Road
- E. Moses Road
- Senapati Bapat Road

It will soon be connected by the Trans harbor Coastal road connector.

=== Railways ===
The closest railway stations are Lower Parel and Mahalaxmi on the Western Line.

=== Metro ===
- The Worli and Acharya Atre Chowk Metro stations on the Aqua Line.

=== Bus ===
It is well connected by the BEST bus service and a depot near Worli Naka, called Worli Agar.

== Education and institutions ==
Worli is home to several reputed educational institutions, including:

- Podar International School
- DY Patil International School
- National Sports Club of India (NSCI), which also serves as a sporting and cultural venue.
- Brihanmumbai Municipal Corporation Worli Seaface Shala (school)
- Sasmira College, Sasmira Institute of Management Studies and Research, Sasmira Textile Institute.

== Politics ==
In October 2019, Aaditya Thackeray contested the 2019 Maharashtra Legislative Assembly election from the Worli constituency and he is currently the MLA of Worli.

== Notable peoples ==
Famous Indian celebrities, as well as celebrity couples, reside in the Worli area of Mumbai:

- Shahid Kapoor
- Rohit Sharma
- Yuvraj Singh
- Virat Kohli and Anushka Sharma
- Riteish Deshmukh and Genelia D'Souza
- Madhuri Dixit

== See also ==
- List of tallest buildings in Mumbai
- Palais Royale, Mumbai
- Omkar 1973
- Three Sixty West
